= Eastern New England English =

Traditional dialect of Maine, New Hampshire and Massachusetts, US

Eastern New England English, historically known as the Yankee dialect since at least the 19th century, is the traditional regional dialect of Maine, New Hampshire, and the eastern half of Massachusetts. Features of this variety once spanned an even larger dialect area of New England, for example, including the eastern halves of Vermont and Connecticut for those born as late as the early twentieth century. Studies vary as to whether the unique dialect of Rhode Island technically falls within the Eastern New England dialect region.

Eastern New England English, here including Rhode Island English, is classically associated with sound patterns such as: non-rhoticity, or dropping r when not before a vowel; both variants of Canadian raising, including a fairly back starting position of the /aʊ/ vowel (as in MOUTH); and some variation of the PALM–LOT–THOUGHT vowel distinctions, the marry–merry distinction, or both. Eastern New England (excluding Rhode Island) is also nationally recognized for its highly front PALM/START vowel. The most well-known subsets include Boston accents, Maine accents, and a cultivated or elite accent, sometimes known as a "Boston Brahmin accent" within Boston, that was associated with wealthy New England families in the late 19th and early 20th centuries.

As of the 21st century, certain traditional characteristics are declining due to many younger Eastern New Englanders avoiding them, particularly non-rhoticity and the aforementioned vowel distinctions, which they tend to perceive as old-fashioned, overly rural-sounding, or even overly urban-sounding with regard to Boston. New Hampshire speakers on the whole are particularly well documented as retreating from these older Eastern New England features since the mid-20th century onwards.

== Overview of phonology ==
The sound system of traditional Eastern New England English includes:

- Non-rhoticity: The r sound may be "dropped" or "silent" if not before a vowel; therefore, in words like car, letter, horse, poor, etc. The feature is retreating and is not found in many younger speakers, for example, in virtually no speakers born since the mid-20th century in southeastern New Hampshire.
  - Linking and intrusive r: The non-rhotic r may be pronounced after all if it is followed by a vowel, even a vowel that begins the next word in the sentence. Also, any word that ends in /ə/ (as in Cuba), /ɑ/ (as in spa), or /ɔ/ (as in law) can be followed by an unwritten r sound when followed by a vowel sound in the next word: thus, law and public safety sounds like Lauren public safety.
- Backing of /u/: The vowel of goose, rude, coup, etc. remains pronounced relatively far back in the mouth.
- Possible lack of the horse–hoarse merger: The vowel of words like war versus wore, or morning versus mourning, are mostly produced either very close or the same in Eastern New England; however, as of the early 2000s, such vowels may still be pronounced differently by some Eastern New England speakers, especially in Maine. Conversely, the merger of the vowels is largely complete elsewhere in the United States.
- Full Canadian raising: The tongue is raised in the first element of the gliding vowel /aɪ/ as well as /aʊ/ whenever either appears before a voiceless consonant. Therefore, a word like house /haʊs/ is often [hɜʊs~hɐʊs].
- Backing of /aʊ/: The vowel of gouge, loud, town, power, etc. has a relatively back-of-mouth starting position: thus, something like [ɑ̈ʊ].
- Possible lack of the Mary–marry–merry mergers: Before intervocalic /r/, the vowels /ɛə/ (/eɪ/ in rhotic varieties), /æ/ and /ɛ/ (as in Mary, marry, and merry) are distinguished from one another, particularly in Southeastern New England (namely Rhode Island), which is also true in the New York City area and Britain. However, recent studies have shown that there is an emerging tendency in Northeastern New England (Boston, for example) to merge them, as in most other American accents.
- "Short a" nasal system: The "short a" sound /æ/ may be tensed in various environments, though most severely before a nasal consonant; therefore, in words like man, clam, Annie, etc.
- Fronting of PALM/START: The vowel of words like palm, spa, car, park, etc. is pronounced farther to the front of the vocal tract than in most other dialects, so that car, for example, is something like [kʰa]. This, plus non-rhoticity, is often associated with the shibboleth "Park the car in Harvard yard." This fronting is seldom reported in Rhode Island, in which car is more often backed [kʰɑ].
- The weak vowel merger is traditionally absent. This makes Lenin /ˈlɛnɪn/ distinct from Lennon /ˈlɛnən/.

== Overview of vocabulary and grammatical features ==
Some words or phrases most famously or strongly associated with Eastern New England are:

- bang: to make a sudden or decisive turn while driving; only used in certain phrases: "bang a left", "bang a right", or "bang a U-ie".
- bubbler or water bubbler: drinking fountain. This term is also used in Wisconsin and Australia.
- bulkie: a thick white-bread roll, similar to a hamburger bun or kaiser roll
- frappe /fræp/: a thick beverage made of milk and ice cream, i.e. a milkshake in most other places (whereas "milkshake" in Boston traditionally means flavored milk). A synonym common only in Rhode Island is cabinet.
- hoodsie: a small disposable cup of ice cream, the kind that comes with a flat wooden spoon (from HP Hood, the dairy that sells them and elsewhere sometimes known as a "dixie cup".) A secondary meaning (very offensive slang) is "promiscuous teenaged girl".
- jimmies: sprinkles; to some, particularly chocolate sprinkles. The term is also common in the Philadelphia area.
- pissa(h): "great" or "amazing", either realistically or sarcastically. This is from the word "pisser" with a Boston accent, but used as an adjective. Occasionally combined with "wicked" to yield "wicked pissah".
- scrod: any small whitefish, such as cod or haddock, used in cooking
- "So don't I": "so do I" or "I do too".
- spa: a neighborhood convenience store that has a soda fountain and often sells sandwiches.
- tonic /ˈtɒnɪk/: any sweet, carbonated soft drink (chiefly confined to Boston), otherwise known as "soda" in the region or "pop" elsewhere; not the same as tonic water.
- whiffle: a crew cut or male haircut done with electric clippers.
- wicked: "very" or "super", used as an adverb or intensifier (such as "That hockey game was wicked good!" or "Ugh, that guy is wicked slow").

Many words common to Boston are also common throughout New England dialects: grinder for "submarine sandwich" (also, spuckie or spuky in East Boston), packie (or package store) for "liquor store", rotary for "traffic circle" (these full-speed circular intersections being common in Greater Boston), and yous as the working-class plural form of "you" (a word found throughout the urban Northeast with many spelling variants). Cellar, whose definition may have slight nuances nationwide, can also be a simple synonym for basement in Eastern New England and Massachusetts generally. In this same area, related expressions like down the cellar or even down-cellar are distinctive, meaning "down to the basement" or "down in the basement" (as in "She's getting some boxes down-cellar").

== Northeastern New England English ==
Northeastern New England English, popularly recognized as a Boston or Maine accent, in addition to all the above phonological features, further includes the merger of the vowel in cot and caught to [ɒ~ɑ], often with a slightly rounded quality, but a resistance to the merger of the vowels in father versus bother, a merger that is otherwise common throughout North America. Also, for speakers born before 1950, the words half and pass (and, before World War II, also ask and can't) are pronounced with a "broad a," like in spa: [haf] and [pʰas].

=== Boston ===
Boston, Massachusetts is the birthplace and most famous site of Eastern New England English. Historically, a Northeastern type of New England English spread from metropolitan Boston into metropolitan Worcester, the bulk of New Hampshire, and central and coastal Maine. Boston speech also originated many slang and uniquely local terms that have since spread throughout Massachusetts and Eastern New England. Although mostly non-rhotic, the modern Boston accent typically pronounces the r sound in the NURSE vowel, /ɜr/, as in bird, learn, turkey, world, etc.

=== Maine ===
A traditional Maine accent, the closest remnant today to a more widespread 19th-century Yankee regional accent, includes the phonology mentioned above, plus the loss of the phonemic status of /ɛə/ (as in there), /ɪə/ (as in here), and /oə/ (as in more) all of which are broken into two syllables (/eɪə, i.ə, oʊə/, respectively): they-uh, hee-yuh, and moh-uh; some distinct vocabulary is also used in this accent. Maine is one of the last American regions to resist the horse–hoarse merger. This continued resistance was verified by some speakers in a 2006 study of Bangor and Portland, Maine, yet contradicted by a 2013 study that reported the merger as embraced by Portland speakers "of all ages". The horse–hoarse separation means that words like war and wore may sound different: war /wɒ/ rhyming with law /lɒ/, and wore /ˈwoʊə/ rhyming with boa /ˈboʊə/. Unlike the Boston accent, this traditional Maine accent may be non-rhotic entirely: even in the pronunciation of /ɜr/ as [ɜ].

=== Notable speakers ===
- Ken Beatrice – "... the New England native with the pronounced Boston accent"
- Bill Burr – "the comic's wicked Boston accent"
- Lenny Clarke – "a Cambridge-raised verbal machine gun with a raspy Boston accent"
- Calvin Coolidge – "r-less New Englander"
- Nick Di Paolo – "thick Boston accent"
- Marty Engstrom – "With a Maine accent so thick some viewers thought it must be fake"
- Doris Haddock – "a broad New Hampshire accent"
- John F. Kennedy – "his tony Harvard accent"
- Robert F. Kennedy – "his Boston twang"
- Ted Kennedy – "No one else from Boston, or anywhere in New England, has imprinted the regional accent on the national consciousness as Senator Kennedy did."
- Mel King – "he has the soft Rs of a deep Boston accent"
- Lyndon LaRouche – "a cultivated New England accent"
- Bob Marley (comedian) – "his thick Maine accent"
- Christy Mihos – "speaks unpretentiously in a variation of a Boston accent, and drops the 'g' in words like talking or running."
- Brian and Jim Moran – "The Moran brothers share an unmistakable Massachusetts accent"
- Edmund Muskie – "had a classic Down East accent, though his father had emigrated from Poland"
- Tim Sample – "with a thick down east accent"
- Tom Silva – "New England accent"
- Robert Skoglund – "a deadpan Maine accent that's as thick as the rolling coastal fog"
- Jermaine Wiggins – "skin as thick as his East Boston accent"

== Rhode Island English ==
The traditional English-language accent of Southeastern New England, popularly known as a Rhode Island accent, is spoken in Rhode Island and the western half of Bristol County, Massachusetts. In addition to all the features mentioned under the phonology section above, the Rhode Island accent also includes a sharp distinction in the vowels of Mary, marry, and merry and in the vowels in cot [ɑ] versus caught [oə], plus the pronunciation of /ɑr/, as in car, far back in the mouth as [ɑ~ɑə]—these three features making this New England accent noticeably similar to a New York accent. These features are often unlike the modern Northeastern New England (NENE) dialect of Boston, as is Rhode Island's feature of a completed father–bother merger, shared with the rest of the country outside of NENE. A few terms are unique to this area, such as the word cabinet to mean "milkshake" (particularly, coffee cabinets), pizza strips (Italian tomato pie strips served cold without cheese), and coffee milk.

=== Notable lifelong native speakers ===
- Gregg Amore – "A lifelong Rhode Islander with the accent to prove it"
- Frank Caprio – "thick New England accent"
- Wendy Carlos – "with the charm of her Rhode Island accent"
- John Chafee – a non-rhotic "New England accent"
- Buddy Cianci – "his Providence accent"
- "Pauly D" DelVecchio – "the thickest Rhode Island accent"
- Henry Giroux
- Spalding Gray – "his demeanor is as flat as his Rhode Island accent"
- Chris Herren – "with a Fall River accent he bellows"
- Emeril Lagasse – "With a Fall River accent that is definitely not Southern"
- Daniel McKee – governor of Rhode Island
- John Pastore
- Jerry Remy – "his familiar broad accent (some would say closer to Rhode Island than Boston)"
- Arlene Violet – "her thick accent ... a reminder of her blue-collar home 'toif' [turf] in South Providence"

== French-American Manchester English ==
An ethnic local accent has been documented among self-identifying French Americans in Manchester, New Hampshire. The accent's most prominent pronunciation features are th-stopping (pronouncing thin like tin and there like dare) and, variably, word-initial h-dropping (so that hair may sound like air).

== See also ==
- Accent (sociolinguistics)
- Boston accent
- Maine accent
- Western New England English
