= Th-stopping =

Pronouncing "th" as "t" or "d"

Th-stopping is the realization of the dental fricatives [θ, ð] as stops—either dental or alveolar—which occurs in several dialects of English. In some accents, such as of Indian English and middle- or upper-class Irish English, they are realized as the dental stops [t̪, d̪] and as such do not merge with the alveolar stops /t, d/; thus, for example, tin ([tʰɪn] in Ireland and [ʈɪn] in India) is not a homophone of thin [t̪ʰɪn]. In other accents, such as varieties of Caribbean English, Nigerian English, Liberian English, and older, rural, or working-class Irish English, such pairs are indeed merged. Variation between both dental and alveolar forms exists in much of the working-class English speech of North America and sometimes southern England. It is also common for babies and toddlers, who are still learning to talk and/or have not fully grown their front teeth capable of producing the th sound. Th-stopping occurred in all continental Germanic languages, resulting in cognates such as German die for "the" and Bruder for "brother".

== New York City English ==
For the working class of New York City and its surrounding region, the fricatives /θ/ and /ð/ are often pronounced as affricatives or stops, rather than as fricatives. Usually they remain dental, so that the oppositions /t-θ/ and [d-ð] are not lost. Thus thanks may be pronounced [θæŋks], [tθæŋks], or [t̪æŋks] in decreasing order of occurrence; all are distinct from tanks [tʰæŋks]. The [t̪] variant has a weakish articulation. The /t-θ/ opposition may be lost, exceptionally in the environment of a following /r/ (making three homophonous with tree), and in the case of the word with, (so that with a may rhyme with the non-rhotic pronunciation of bitter-bidder; with you may be [wɪtʃu], following the same yod-coalescence rule as hit you. These pronunciations are all stigmatized.

The [d-ð] opposition seems to be lost more readily, though not as readily as the "Brooklynese" stereotype might lead one to believe. As in many other places, initial [ð] is subject to assimilation or deletion in a range of environments in relatively informal and/or popular speech, e.g. who's there [huz (z)ɛə]; as in many other places, it is also subject to stopping there /dɛə/. This option extends to one or two words in which the /ð/ is not initial, e.g. other, which can thus become a homonym of utter-udder. But it would not be usual for southern to be pronounced identically with sudden or breathe with breed.

== African-American Vernacular English ==
In African-American Vernacular English, in the words with and nothing, [t] may occur corresponding to standard [θ], with the [t] itself being succeeded by the t-glottalization rule: thus [wɪʔ] for with and [ˈnʌʔɪn] for nothing. Th-stopping is also reported for some other non-initial [θ]s, apparently particularly when preceded by a nasal and followed by a plosive, as keep your mouth closed. In initial position, [θ] occurs in AAVE just as in standard accents: thin is [θɪn], without the stopping of West Indian accents. Stopping of initial [ð], however, is frequent, making then pronounced as [d̪ɪ̃n] or sometimes homophonous with den.

== Frequency in other accents ==
Th-stopping is also commonly heard, specifically from speakers of working-class origins, in the American English dialects of the Inland North (for example, in Milwaukee, Chicago, Detroit, Cleveland, and Buffalo), the Upper Midwest (for example, in the especially Fennoscandian-descended locals of Minnesota's Iron Range and Michigan's Upper Peninsula), and the Mid-Atlantic region (for example, in Philadelphia and Baltimore). It is also heard in a minority of speakers of England's Estuary dialect (for example, in London), but only in the case of word-initial /ð/. Many speakers of Philippine English and some speakers of other variants in Asia also have th-stopping.

The dialect of Sheffield in England is sometimes referred to as "dee-dar" because of the th-stopping to change initial /ð/ to /d/. However, a 1997 study in Sheffield found this was then largely confined to older males.

In certain international radiotelecommunications, such as the NATO phonetic alphabet, the digit code words three and thousand are pronounced [tʰɹiː] and [ˈtʰaʊz(ə)nd] to avoid mispronouncing them as [sɹiː] and [ˈsaʊz(ə)nd].

== Homophonous pairs ==
/t, d/	/θ, ð/	IPA	Notes
ate	eighth	ˈeɪt	Some accents pronounce ate as /ɛt/
Bart	bath	ˈbɑːt	Non-rhotic accents with trap–bath split.
bat	bath	ˈbæt	Without trap–bath split.
bayed	bathe	ˈbeɪd	
bet	Beth	ˈbɛt	
bladder	blather	ˈblædə(ɹ)	
blight	Blythe	ˈblaɪt	
blitter	blither	ˈblɪɾə(ɹ)	With intervocalic alveolar flapping.
boat	both	ˈboʊt	
body	bothy	ˈbɒɾi	Without lot–cloth split and with intervocalic alveolar flapping.
boot	booth	ˈbuːt	
breed	breathe	ˈbɹiːd	
Brett	breath	ˈbɹɛt	
brought	broth	ˈbrɔːt	With lot–cloth split. Also /ˈbrɒt/ in some accents.
cedar	seether	ˈsiːdə(ɹ)	
cent	synth	ˈsɪnt	With pin–pen merger.
cite	scythe	ˈsaɪt	
clot	cloth	ˈklɒt	Without cot–caught merger.
coot	couth	ˈkuːt	
D; dee	the	ˈdiː	The before vowels and silent H.
D; dee	thee	ˈdiː	
Dan	than	ˈdæn	
dare	their	ˈdeə(ɹ)	
dare	there	ˈdeə(ɹ)	
dare	they're	ˈdeə(ɹ)	
Darude	the rude	dəˈruːd	
day	they	ˈdeɪ	
debt	death	ˈdɛt	
Dee	the	ˈdiː	The before vowels and silent H.
Dee	thee	ˈdiː	
den	then	ˈdɛn	
dense	thence	ˈdɛns	
dents	thence	ˈdɛn(t)s	
dhow	thou	ˈdaʊ	
die	thy	ˈdaɪ	
dine	thine	ˈdaɪn	
dirt	dearth	ˈdɜː(ɹ)t	with fern–fir–fur merger.
dis	this	ˈdɪs	
doe	though	ˈdoʊ	
does	those	ˈdoʊz	
dough	though	ˈdoʊ	
dow	thou	ˈdaʊ	
dow	though	ˈdoʊ	
drought	drouth	ˈdɹaʊt	
dye	thy	ˈdaɪ	
eater	either	ˈiːɾə(ɹ)	With intervocalic alveolar flapping.
eater	ether	ˈiːtə(ɹ)	With intervocalic alveolar flapping.
eight	eighth	ˈeɪt	
Ent	nth	ˈɛnt	
fate	faith	ˈfeɪt	
fetter	feather	ˈfɛɾə(ɹ)	With intervocalic alveolar flapping.
fit	fifth	ˈfɪt	Some accents pronounce fifth as /ˈfɪft/.
fodder	father	ˈfɑːdə(ɹ)	With father–bother merger.
fort	forth	ˈfɔː(ɹ)t	
fort	fourth	ˈfɔː(ɹ)t	
fraught	froth	ˈfɹɔːt	With lot–cloth split.
frot	froth	ˈfɹɒt	Without lot–cloth split.
got	goth, Goth	ˈɡɒt	
groat	growth	ˈɡɹoʊt	
hart	hearth	ˈhɑː(ɹ)t	
hat	hath	ˈhæt	
header	heather	ˈhɛdə(ɹ)	
heart	hearth	ˈhɑː(ɹ)t	
heat	heath	ˈhiːt	
hitter	hither	ˈhɪɾə(ɹ)	With intervocalic alveolar flapping.
hurt	earth	ˈɜː(ɹ)t	With H-dropping and fern–fir–fur merger.
Ida	either	ˈaɪdə	Non-rhotic accents.
knead	neath	ˈniːd	
kneader	neither	ˈniːdə(ɹ)	
kneed	neath	ˈniːd	
ladder	lather	ˈlædə(ɹ)	
lade	lathe	ˈleɪd	
laid	lathe	ˈleɪd	
latter	lather	ˈlæɾə(ɹ)	With intervocalic alveolar flapping.
letter	leather	ˈlɛɾə(ɹ)	With intervocalic alveolar flapping.
lied	lithe	ˈlaɪd	
load	loathe	ˈloʊd	
lode	loathe	ˈloʊd	
loud	Louth	ˈlaʊd	
martyr	Martha	ˈmɑːtə	Non-rhotic accents.
mat	math	ˈmæt	
matte	math	ˈmæt	
mead	Meath	ˈmiːd	
meat	Meath	ˈmiːt	
meet	Meath	ˈmiːt	
met	meth	ˈmɛt	
mete	Meath	ˈmiːt	
mitt	myth	ˈmɪt	
motte	moth	ˈmɑt	
mutter	mother	ˈmʌɾə(ɹ)	With intervocalic alveolar flapping.
naught	north	ˈnɔːt	Non-rhotic accents.
neater	neither	ˈniːɾə(ɹ)	With intervocalic alveolar flapping. Some accents pronounce neither as /ˈnaɪtə(ɹ)/.
neat	neath	ˈniːt	
need	neath	ˈniːd	
oat	oath	ˈoʊt	
oats	oaths	ˈoʊts	
odes	oaths	ˈoʊdz	
pads	paths	ˈpædz	Without trap–bath split.
paid	pathe	ˈpeɪd	
part	path	ˈpɑːt	Non-rhotic accents with trap–bath split.
parts	paths	ˈpɑːts	Non-rhotic accents with trap–bath split.
pat	path	ˈpæt	Without trap–bath split.
pats	paths	ˈpæts	Without trap–bath split.
pit	pith	ˈpɪt	
pity	pithy	ˈpɪti	
rat	wrath	ˈɹæt	Without trap–bath split.
rate	wraith	ˈɹeɪt	
read	wreathe	ˈɹiːd	
reads	wreathes	ˈɹiːdz	
reads	wreaths	ˈɹiːdz	
reed	wreathe	ˈɹiːd	
reeds	wreathes	ˈɹiːdz	
reeds	wreaths	ˈɹiːdz	
ride	writhe	ˈɹaɪd	
rot	Roth	ˈɹɒt	Without lot–cloth split.
root	ruth, Ruth	ˈɹuːt	With yod-dropping. Some accents pronounce root as /ˈɹʊt/.
route	ruth, Ruth	ˈɹuːt	With yod-dropping. Some accents pronounce route as /ˈɹaʊt/.
scent	synth	ˈsɪnt	With pen–pin merger.
seed	seethe	ˈsiːd	
seeder	seether	ˈsiːdə(ɹ)	
sent	synth	ˈsɪnt	With pen–pin merger.
set	saith	ˈsɛt	
set	Seth	ˈsɛt	
she'd	sheathe	ˈʃiːd	
sheet	sheath	ˈʃiːt	
side	scythe	ˈsaɪd	
sight	scythe	ˈsaɪt	
sit	Sith	ˈsɪt	
site	scythe	ˈsaɪt	
smit	smith	ˈsmɪt	
smite	Smyth	ˈsmaɪt	
spilt	spilth	ˈspɪlt	
soot	sooth	ˈsuːt	Some accents pronounce soot as /ˈsʊt/.
sudden	southern	ˈsʌdən	Non-rhotic accents.
sued	soothe	ˈsuːd	With yod-dropping.
suede	swathe	ˈsweɪd	Some accents pronounce swathe as /ˈswɒd/.
suit	sooth	ˈsuːt	With yod-dropping.
swat	swath	ˈswɒt	Without lot–cloth split.
swayed	swathe	ˈsweɪd	Some accents pronounce swathe as /ˈswɒd/.
tank	thank	ˈtæŋk	
tater	theta	ˈteɪtə	Non-rhotic accents. Some accents pronounce theta as /ˈtiːtə/.
taught	thought	ˈtɔːt	
team	theme	ˈtiːm	
teary	theory	ˈtɪəɹi	
teat	teeth	ˈtiːt	
teed	teethe	ˈtiːd	
teeter	theta	ˈtiːtə	Non-rhotic accents. Some accents pronounce theta as /ˈteɪtə/.
tent	tenth	ˈtɛnt	
Thai	thigh	ˈtaɪ	
tic	thick	ˈtɪk	
tick	thick	ˈtɪk	
ticket	thicket	ˈtɪkət	
tide	tithe	ˈtaɪd	
tie	thigh	ˈtaɪ	
tied	tithe	ˈtaɪd	
tin	thin	ˈtɪn	
tinker	thinker	ˈtɪnkə(ɹ)	
toot	tooth	ˈtuːt	
tor	thaw	ˈtɔː	Non-rhotic accents.
tor	Thor	ˈtɔː(ɹ)	
tore	thaw	ˈtɔː	Non-rhotic accents with horse–hoarse merger.
tore	Thor	ˈtɔː(ɹ)	With horse–hoarse merger.
torn	thorn	ˈtɔː(ɹ)n	With horse–hoarse merger.
tort	thought	ˈtɔː(ɹ)t	Non-rhotic accents.
tote	Thoth	ˈtoʊt	
trash	thrash	ˈtɹæʃ	
trawl	thrall	ˈtɹɔːl	
tread	thread	ˈtɹɛd	
tree	three	ˈtɹiː	
trill	thrill	ˈtɹɪl	
true	threw	ˈtɹuː, ˈtɹɪu	
true	through	ˈtɹuː	With yod-dropping.
trust	thrust	ˈtɹʌst	
tum	thumb	ˈtʌm	
tump	thump	ˈtʌmp	
turd	third	ˈtɜː(ɹ)d	With fern–fir–fur merger.
udder	other	ˈʌdə(ɹ)	
utter	other	ˈʌɾə(ɹ)	With intervocalic alveolar flapping.
Utes	youths	ˈjuːts	
welt	wealth	ˈwɛlt	
wetter	weather	ˈwɛɾə(ɹ)	With intervocalic alveolar flapping.
wit	width	ˈwɪt	
wit	with	ˈwɪt	
wordy	worthy	ˈwɜː(ɹ)di, ˈwʌɹdi	
wort	worth	ˈwɜː(ɹ)t, ˈwʌɹt	Some accents pronounce wort as /ˈwɔː(ɹ)t/.
wrought	Roth	ˈɹɔːt	With lot–cloth split.
wrought	wroth	ˈɹɔːt	With lot–cloth split.

== See also ==
- List of Th-stopping homophones
- Th-fronting
- Definite article reduction

Place →	Labial					Coronal										Dorsal					Laryngeal			
Manner ↓	Bilabial		Labiodental		Linguolabial		Dental		Alveolar		Postalveolar		Retroflex		(Alveolo-)palatal		Velar		Uvular		Pharyngeal/epiglottal		Glottal	
Nasal	m̥	m	ɱ̊	ɱ		n̼	n̪̊	n̪	n̥	n	n̠̊	n̠	ɳ̊	ɳ	ɲ̊	ɲ	ŋ̊	ŋ	ɴ̥	ɴ				
Plosive	p	b	p̪	b̪	t̼	d̼	t̪	d̪	t	d			ʈ	ɖ	c	ɟ	k	ɡ	q	ɢ	ʡ		ʔ	
Sibilant affricate							t̪s̪	d̪z̪	ts	dz	t̠ʃ	d̠ʒ	tʂ	dʐ	tɕ	dʑ								
Non-sibilant affricate	pɸ	bβ	p̪f	b̪v			t̪θ	d̪ð	tɹ̝̊	dɹ̝	t̠ɹ̠̊˔	d̠ɹ̠˔			cç	ɟʝ	kx	ɡɣ	qχ	ɢʁ	ʡʜ	ʡʢ	ʔh	
Sibilant fricative							s̪	z̪	s	z	ʃ	ʒ	ʂ	ʐ	ɕ	ʑ								
Non-sibilant fricative	ɸ	β	f	v	θ̼	ð̼	θ	ð	θ̠	ð̠	ɹ̠̊˔	ɹ̠˔	ɻ̊˔	ɻ˔	ç	ʝ	x	ɣ	χ	ʁ	ħ	ʕ	h	ɦ
Approximant		β̞		ʋ				ð̞		ɹ		ɹ̠		ɻ		j		ɰ						˷
Tap/flap		ⱱ̟		ⱱ					ɾ̥	ɾ			ɽ̊	ɽ						ɢ̆		ʡ̮		
Trill	ʙ̥	ʙ							r̥	r		r̠	ɽ̊r̥	ɽr					ʀ̥	ʀ	ʜ	ʢ		
Lateral affricate									tɬ	dɮ			tꞎ	d𝼅	c𝼆	ɟʎ̝	k𝼄	ɡʟ̝						
Lateral fricative							ɬ̪		ɬ	ɮ			ꞎ	𝼅	𝼆	ʎ̝	𝼄	ʟ̝						
Lateral approximant								l̪	l̥	l		l̠	ɭ̊	ɭ	ʎ̥	ʎ	ʟ̥	ʟ		ʟ̠				
Lateral tap/flap									ɺ̥	ɺ			𝼈̊	𝼈		ʎ̮		ʟ̆						

		BL	LD	D	A	PA	RF	P	V	U
Implosive	Voiced	ɓ			ɗ		ᶑ	ʄ	ɠ	ʛ
Implosive	Voiceless	ɓ̥			ɗ̥		ᶑ̊	ʄ̊	ɠ̊	ʛ̥
Ejective	Stop	pʼ			tʼ		ʈʼ	cʼ	kʼ	qʼ
Ejective	Affricate		p̪fʼ	t̪θʼ	tsʼ	t̠ʃʼ	tʂʼ	tɕʼ	kxʼ	qχʼ
Ejective	Fricative	ɸʼ	fʼ	θʼ	sʼ	ʃʼ	ʂʼ	ɕʼ	xʼ	χʼ
Ejective	Lateral affricate				tɬʼ			c𝼆ʼ	k𝼄ʼ	q𝼄ʼ
Ejective	Lateral fricative				ɬʼ					
Click (top: velar; bottom: uvular)	Tenuis	kʘ qʘ		kǀ qǀ	kǃ qǃ		k𝼊 q𝼊	kǂ qǂ		
Click (top: velar; bottom: uvular)	Voiced	ɡʘ ɢʘ		ɡǀ ɢǀ	ɡǃ ɢǃ		ɡ𝼊 ɢ𝼊	ɡǂ ɢǂ		
Click (top: velar; bottom: uvular)	Nasal	ŋʘ ɴʘ		ŋǀ ɴǀ	ŋǃ ɴǃ		ŋ𝼊 ɴ𝼊	ŋǂ ɴǂ	ʞ	
Click (top: velar; bottom: uvular)	Tenuis lateral				kǁ qǁ					
Click (top: velar; bottom: uvular)	Voiced lateral				ɡǁ ɢǁ					
Click (top: velar; bottom: uvular)	Nasal lateral				ŋǁ ɴǁ					
