= North American English =

Set of varieties of English language

- North American English
- English
- Native to: United States, Canada
- Region: Northern America
- Ethnicity: Anglo-Americans (Northern Americans (Americans, Canadians))
- Language family: Indo-European: Germanic; West Germanic; North Sea Germanic; Anglo-Frisian; Anglic; English; North American English
- Early forms: Proto-Indo-European: Proto-Germanic; Proto-West Germanic; Proto-English; Old English; Middle English; Early Modern English; Modern English
- Dialects: American English, Canadian English and their subdivisions
- Writing system: Latin (English alphabet); Unified English Braille

Language codes
- ISO 639-3: –
- Glottolog: nort3314
- IETF: en-021

North American English (NAmE) encompasses the English language as spoken in both the United States and Canada. Because of their related histories and cultures, plus the similarities between the pronunciations (accents), vocabulary, and grammar of American English and Canadian English, linguists often group the two together. Canadian English generally is tolerant of both British and American spellings; however, certain words always take British spellings (e.g., cheque rather than check) and others American spellings (e.g., tire rather than tyre).

Dialects of English spoken by United Empire Loyalists who fled the American Revolution (1775–1783) have had a large influence on Canadian English from its early roots. Some terms in North American English are used almost exclusively in Canada and the United States (for example, the terms diaper and gasoline are widely used instead of nappy and petrol). Although many English speakers from outside North America regard those terms as distinct Americanisms, they are just as common in Canada, mainly due to the effects of heavy cross-border trade and cultural penetration by the American mass media. The list of divergent words becomes longer if considering regional Canadian dialects, especially as spoken in the Atlantic provinces and parts of Vancouver Island where significant pockets of British culture still remain.

There are a considerable number of different accents within the regions of both the United States and Canada. In North America, different English dialects of immigrants from England, Scotland, Ireland, and other regions of the British Isles mixed together in the 17th and 18th centuries. These were developed, built upon, and blended together as new waves of immigration, and migration across the North American continent, developed new dialects in new areas, and as these ways of speaking merged with and assimilated to the greater American dialect mixture that solidified by the mid-18th century.

== Dialects ==
The American English major regional dialects (in all caps), plus smaller and more local dialects, as demarcated primarily by William Labov et al.'s The Atlas of North American English, as well as the related Telsur Project's regional maps. Many regions also contain speakers of a "General American" accent that resists the marked features of their region. This map does not account for speakers of ethnic or racial dialects.
The Canadian English's major regional dialects (in all caps), plus smaller and more local dialects, as demarcated primarily by William Labov et al.'s The Atlas of North American English, as well as the related Telsur Project's regional maps. Many regions also contain speakers of a "General American" accent that resists the marked features of their region. This map does not account for speakers of ethnic or racial dialects.

=== American English ===
- General American

==== Ethnic American English ====
- African-American English
  - African-American Vernacular English
- American Indian English
- Cajun English
- Chicano English
- Miami Latino English
- New York Latino English
- Pennsylvania Dutch English
- Yeshiva English

==== Regional American English ====
- Midland American English
- New York City English
- Northern American English
  - Inland Northern American ("Great Lakes") English
  - New England English
    - Eastern New England English
      - Boston English
      - Maine English
    - Western New England English
  - North-Central American ("Upper Midwest") English
- Philadelphia English
  - Baltimore English
- Southern American English
  - Appalachian English
  - High Tider English
  - New Orleans English
  - Older Southern American English
  - Texan English
- Western American English
  - California English
  - Pacific Northwest English
- Western Pennsylvania ("Pittsburgh") English

=== Canadian English ===
- Aboriginal Canadian English
- Atlantic Canadian English
  - Lunenburg English
  - Newfoundland English
- Ottawa Valley English
- Pacific Northwest English
- Quebec English
- Standard Canadian English

=== Table of accents ===
Below, several major North American English accents are defined by particular characteristics:

Accent name	Most populous city	Strong /aʊ/ fronting	Strong /oʊ/ fronting	Strong /u/ fronting	Strong /ɑr/ fronting	Cot–caught merger	Pin–pen merger	/æ/ raising system	Other defining criteria
African-American		Mixed	No	No	No	Mixed	Yes	pre-nasal	African-American Vowel Shift / Variable non-rhoticity / L-vocalization / Th-fronting
Atlantic Canadian	Halifax	Mixed	No	Yes	Yes	Yes	No	various	Canadian raising
General American		No	No	No	No	Mixed	No	pre-nasal	
Inland Northern U.S.	Chicago	No	No	No	Yes	No	No	general	Northern Cities Vowel Shift
Midland U.S.	Indianapolis	Yes	Yes	Yes	No	Mixed	Mixed	pre-nasal	
New Orleans	New Orleans	Yes	Yes	Yes	No	No	No	split	Mid-Atlantic Back Vowel Shift / Non-rhoticity / Th-stopping / Southern Vowel Shift / Variable horse-hoarse distinction / Canadian Raising / L-vocalization
New York City	New York City	Yes	No	No	No	No	No	split	Mid-Atlantic Back Vowel Shift / Variable non-rhoticity / L-vocalization / Th-stopping / Variable Father-bother distinction / Northeastern /-ɒr-/
North-Central (Upper Midwestern) U.S.	Fargo	No	No	No	Yes	Yes	No	pre-nasal & pre-velar	
Northeastern New England	Boston	No	No	No	Yes	Yes	No	pre-nasal	Variable non-rhoticity / Canadian raising / Father-bother distinction / Northeastern /-ɒr-/
Philadelphia	Philadelphia	Yes	Yes	Yes	No	No	No	split	Mid-Atlantic Back Vowel Shift / L-vocalization / Northeastern /-ɒr-/ / Merry–Murray merger
Rhode Island	Providence	No	No	No	No	No	No	pre-nasal	Mid-Atlantic Back Vowel Shift / Variable non-rhoticity / Canadian raising / Northeastern /-ɒr-/
Southern U.S.	San Antonio	Yes	Yes	Yes	No	Mixed	Yes	pre-nasal	Southern drawl / Southern Vowel Shift / Variable wine-whine distinction
Standard Canadian	Toronto	No	No	Yes	No	Yes	No	pre-nasal & pre-velar	Canadian raising / Low Back Merger Shift
Western U.S.	Los Angeles	No	Mixed	Yes	No	Yes	No	pre-nasal	Low Back Merger Shift
Western Pennsylvania	Pittsburgh	Yes	Yes	Yes	No	Yes	Mixed	pre-nasal	/aʊ/ glide weakening / L-vocalization
Accent name	Most populous city	Strong /aʊ/ fronting	Strong /oʊ/ fronting	Strong /u/ fronting	Strong /ɑr/ fronting	Cot–caught merger	Pin–pen merger	/æ/ raising system	Other defining criteria

== Phonology ==
A majority of North American English (for example, in contrast to British English) includes phonological features that concern consonants, such as rhoticity (full pronunciation of all /r/ sounds), conditioned T-glottalization (with satin pronounced [ˈsæʔn̩], not [ˈsætn̩]), T- and D-flapping (with metal and medal pronounced the same, as [ˈmɛɾɫ̩]), L-velarization (with filling pronounced [ˈfɪɫɪŋ], not [ˈfɪlɪŋ]), as well as features that concern vowel sounds, such as various vowel mergers before /r/ (so that, Mary, marry, and merry are all commonly pronounced the same), raising of pre-voiceless /aɪ/ (with price and bright using a higher vowel sound than prize and bride), the weak vowel merger (with affected and effected often pronounced the same), at least one of the LOT vowel mergers (the LOT–PALM merger is completed among virtually all Americans and the LOT–THOUGHT merger among nearly half, while both are completed among virtually all Canadians), and yod-dropping (with tuesday pronounced /ˈtuzdeɪ/, not /ˈtjuzdeɪ/). The last item is more advanced in American English than Canadian English.

== See also ==
- Belizean English
- Caribbean English
- Commonwealth English
- Comparison of American and British English
- List of American words not widely used in the United Kingdom
- List of words having different meanings in British and American English
- North American French
- North American Spanish
- Regional accents of English

== Bibliography ==
- Chambers, J.K. (1998). "Canadian English: 250 Years in the Making," in The Canadian Oxford Dictionary, 2nd ed., p. xi.
- Clark, Joe (2008). Organizing Our Marvellous Neighbours: How to Feel Good About Canadian English (e-book). ISBN 978-0-9809525-0-6.
- Labov, William (1972), Language in the Inner City: Studies in Black English Vernacular, Philadelphia: University of Pennsylvania Press
- Labov, William; Ash, Sharon; Boberg, Charles (2006), The Atlas of North American English, Berlin: Mouton-de Gruyter, ISBN 3-11-016746-8
