= English-language vowel changes before historical /r/ =

In English, many vowel shifts affect only vowels followed by /r/ in rhotic dialects, or vowels that were historically followed by /r/ that has been elided in non-rhotic dialects. Most of them involve the merging of vowel distinctions, so fewer vowel phonemes occur before /r/ than in other positions of a word. Rhotic accents pronounce the /r/ sound after a vowel, as in car and hard while in non-rhotic accents usually do not pronounce /r/ when it comes after a vowel and no vowel follows, as in car.

== Overview ==
In rhotic dialects, /r/ is pronounced in most cases. In General American English (GA), /r/ is pronounced as an approximant [ɹ] or [ɻ] in most positions, but after some vowels, it is pronounced as r-coloring. In Scottish English, /r/ is traditionally pronounced as a flap [ɾ] or trill [r], and there are no r-colored vowels.

In non-rhotic dialects like Received Pronunciation (RP), historic /r/ is elided at the end of a syllable, and if the preceding vowel is stressed, it undergoes compensatory lengthening or breaking (diphthongization). Thus, words that historically had /r/ often have long vowels or centering diphthongs ending in a schwa /ə/, or a diphthong followed by a schwa.

- earth: GA [ɝθ], RP [ɜːθ]
- here: GA [ˈhɪɚ], RP [ˈhɪə]
- fire: GA [ˈfaɪɚ], RP [ˈfaɪə]

In most English dialects, there are vowel shifts that affect only vowels before /r/ or vowels that were historically followed by /r/. Vowel shifts before historical /r/ fall into two categories: mergers and splits. Mergers are more common, so most English dialects have fewer vowel distinctions before historical /r/ than in other positions of a word.

In many North American dialects, there are ten or eleven stressed monophthongs; only five or six vowel (rarely seven) contrasts are possible before a preconsonantal and word-final /r/ (beer, bear, burr, bar, bore, bor, boor). Often, more contrasts exist if /r/ appears between vowels of different syllables. In some American dialects and in most native English dialects outside North America, for example, mirror and nearer do not rhyme, and some or all of marry, merry, and Mary are pronounced distinctly. (In North America, those distinctions are most likely to occur in New York City, Philadelphia, some of Eastern New England (including Boston), and in conservative Southern accents.) In many dialects, however, the number of contrasts in that position tends to be reduced, and the tendency seems to be towards further reduction. The difference in how the reductions have been manifested represents one of the greatest sources of cross-dialect variation.

Non-rhotic accents in many cases show mergers in the same positions as rhotic accents even though there is often no /r/ phoneme present. That results partly from mergers that occurred before the /r/ was lost and partly from later mergers of the centering diphthongs and long vowels that resulted from the loss of /r/.

The phenomenon that occurs in many dialects of the United States is one of tense–lax neutralization in which the normal English distinction between tense and lax vowels is eliminated.

In some cases, the quality of a vowel before /r/ is different from the quality of the vowel elsewhere. For example, in some dialects of American English, the quality of the vowel in more typically does not occur except before /r/, and it is somewhere in between the vowels of maw and mow. It is similar to the vowel of the latter word but without the glide.

Different mergers occur in different dialects. Generally, these correlate to accents with rhotic vowels, as opposed to non-rhoticity (as in most of British English) or fully pronounced /r/ (as in Scottish English).

== Mergers before intervocalic R ==
=== Lax vowels ===
Most North American English dialects merge the lax vowels with the tense vowels before /r/, so "marry" and "merry" have the same vowel as "mare", "mirror" has the same vowel as "mere", "forest" has the same vowel as the stressed form of "for", and "hurry" has the same vowel as "stir" as well as that found in the second syllable of "letter". The mergers are typically resisted by non-rhotic North Americans and are largely absent in areas of the United States that are historically largely non-rhotic.

=== Hurry–furry merger ===
Distinction between hurry and furry
Hurry vs. furry ([ˈhʌri] vs. [ˈfɝi])

Speaker with merger: worry [ˈwɝi]

Speaker without merger: worry [ˈwʌri]

The hurry–furry merger occurs when the vowel /ʌ/ before intervocalic /r/ is merged with /ɜ/. That is particularly a feature in many dialects of North American English but not New York City English, Mid-Atlantic American English, older Southern American English, some speakers of Eastern New England English, and speakers of Southeastern New England English. Speakers with the merger pronounce hurry to rhyme with furry and turret to rhyme with stir it.

To occur, the merger requires the NURSE mergers to be in full effect, which is the case in nearly all English dialects worldwide, particularly outside the British Isles. However, in Scotland, hurry /ˈhʌre/ is a perfect rhyme of furry /ˈfʌre/, but also the nurse mergers have never developed there, meaning that strut, dress and kit can all still exist before both intervocalic and coda /r/; thus, fur, fern, and fir have distinct vowels: /fʌr, fɛrn, fɪr/.

Dialects in England, Wales, and most others outside North America maintain the distinction between both sounds, so hurry and furry do not rhyme. However, in dialects without the FOOT–STRUT split, hurry has an entirely different vowel: /ˈhʊri/ (in a number of those dialects, a SQUARE–NURSE merger is in effect instead).

General American has a three-way merger between the first vowels in hurry and furry and the unstressed vowel in letters. In Received Pronunciation, all of them have different sounds (/ʌ/, /ɜː/ and /ə/, respectively), and some minimal pairs exist between unstressed /ɜː/ and /ə/, such as foreword /ˈfɔːwɜːd/ vs. forward /ˈfɔːwəd/. In General American, they collapse to [ˈfɔrwɚd], but in phonemic transcription, they can still be differentiated as /ˈfɔrwɜrd/ and /ˈfɔrwərd/ to facilitate comparisons with other accents. General American also often lacks a proper opposition between /ʌ/ and /ə/, which makes minimal pairs such as unorthodoxy and an orthodoxy variably homophonous as /ənˈɔrθədɑksi/. See the strut–comma merger for more information.

In New Zealand English, there is a consistent contrast between hurry and furry, but the unstressed /ə/ is lengthened to /ɜː/ (phonetically [ɵː]) in many positions, particularly in formal or slow speech and especially when it is spelled ⟨er⟩. Thus, boarded and bordered might be distinguished as /ˈbɔːdəd/ and /ˈbɔːdɜːd/, which is homophonous in Australian English as /ˈbɔːdəd/ and distinguished in Received Pronunciation as /ˈbɔːdɪd/ and /ˈbɔːdəd/, based on the length and the rounding of /ɜː/. The shift was caused by a complete phonemic merger of /ɪ/ and /ə/, a weak vowel merger that was generalized to all environments.

hurry–furry merger homophones
/ʌr/	/ʊr/	/ɜr/	IPA
currier	courier		/ˈkɜriər/
demurrer (legal objection)		demurrer (one who demurs)	/dɪˈmɜriər/
furrier (n.)	Fourier	furrier (adj.)	/ˈfɜriər/

=== Mary–marry–merry merger ===
Mary–marry–merry
Example of an American speaker without the Mary–marry–merry merger

One notable merger of vowels before /r/ is the Mary–marry–merry merger, a merging of the vowels /æ/ (as in the name Carrie or the word marry) and /ɛ/ (as in Kerry or merry) with the historical /eɪ/ (as in Cary or Mary) whenever they are realized before intervocalic /r/. No contrast exists before a final or preconsonantal /r/, where /æ/ merged with /ɑ/ and /ɛ/ with /ɜ/ (see Nurse mergers) centuries ago. The merger is fairly widespread and is complete or nearly complete in most varieties of North American English, but it is rare in other varieties of English. The following variants are common in North America:

- The full Mary–marry–merry merger (also known, in this context, as the three-way merger) is found throughout much of the United States (particularly the Western and Central United States) and in all of Canada except Montreal. This is found in about 57% of American English speakers, according to a 2003 dialect survey. The merger is highlighted in the song Merry Go 'Round, whose central wordplay revolves around "Mary", "marry", and "merry" having the exact same pronunciation in the singer's accent.
- No merger, also known as a three-way contrast, exists in North America primarily in the Northeastern United States and is most clearly documented in the accents of Philadelphia, New Jersey, New York City, Rhode Island, and Boston. In the Philadelphia accent, the three-way contrast is preserved, but merry tends to be merged with Murray (see merry–Murray merger). The three-way contrast is found in about 17% of American English speakers overall.
- The Mary–marry merger is found alone with 16% of American English speakers overall, with the highest concentration in New England, especially New Hampshire.
- The Mary–merry merger is found alone among 9% of American English speakers overall, concentrated in the American South, especially Louisiana where it is the most common variant, and the Southern part of the Mid-Atlantic region. It is also found among Anglophones in Montreal.
- The merry–marry merger is found alone rarely, with about 1% of American English speakers.

In accents without the merger, Mary has the a sound of mare, marry has the "short a" sound of mat, and merry has the "short e" sound of met. In Standard Southern British, they are pronounced as [ˈmɛːɹiː], [ˈmaɹiː], and [ˈmɛɹiː]; in Australian English, as [ˈmeːɹiː], [ˈmæɹiː ~ ˈmaɹiː], and [ˈmeɹiː]; in New York City English, as [ˈmeɹi⁓ˈmɛəɹi], [ˈmæɹi], and [ˈmɛɹi]; and in Philadelphia English, the same as New York City except merry is [ˈmɛɹi⁓ˈmʌɹi]. There is plenty of variance in the distribution of the merger, with expatriate communities of those speakers being formed all over the country.

The Mary–merry merger is possible in New Zealand, and the quality of the merged vowel is then [e̝] (similar to kit in General American). However, in New Zealand, the vowel in Mary often merges with the near vowel /iə/ instead (see near–square merger), which before intervocalic /r/ may then merge with /iː/, so Mary (phonemically /ˈmeəriː/) can be [ˈmiəɹiː] or [ˈmiːɹiː] instead. In all of those cases, marry /ˈmɛriː/ (with the trap vowel) is clearly distinguished from Mary and merry (regardless of how both are pronounced).

A similar pronunciation to the resultant merged vowel occurs in /æ/ raising (albeit in a non-rhotic environment).

Mary–marry–merry merger homophones
/ær/	/ɛər/	/ɛr/	IPA	Notes
Aaron (Note: Aaron may be pronounced either /ˈærən/ or /ˈɛərən/ by speakers without the merger.)		Erin	ˈɛərən	with weak-vowel merger
apparel	-	a peril	əˈpɛərəl	with weak-vowel merger
arable	airable	errable	ˈɛərəbəl	
-	airer	error	ˈɛərə(r)	
barrel	-	beryl	ˈbɛərəl	with weak-vowel merger before /l/
barrier	-	burier	ˈbɛəriə(r)	
Barry	-	berry	ˈbɛəri	
Barry	-	bury	ˈbɛəri	
Carrie	Cary	Kerry	ˈkɛəri	
carry	Cary	Kerry	ˈkɛəri	
-	chary	cherry	ˈtʃɛəri	
-	dairy	Derry	ˈdɛəri	
-	fairy	ferry	ˈfɛəri	
Farrell	-	feral	ˈfɛərəl	with weak-vowel merger before /l/
farrier	-	ferrier	ˈfɛəriə(r)	
farrow	Faroe‡	-	ˈfɛəroʊ	
farrow	pharaoh‡	-	ˈfɛəroʊ	
harrowing	-	heroin	ˈhɛəroʊɪn	with G-dropping
harrowing	-	heroine	ˈhɛəroʊɪn	with G-dropping
Harry	hairy	-	ˈhɛəri	
-	haring	herring	ˈhɛərɪŋ	
Harold	-	herald	ˈhɛərəld	
marry	Mary	merry	ˈmɛəri	
parish	-	perish	ˈpɛərɪʃ	
parry	-	Perry	ˈpɛəri	
-	scary	skerry	ˈskɛəri	
-	Tara‡	Terra	ˈtɛərə	
tarrier	-	terrier	ˈtɛəriə(r)	
tarry	-	Terry	ˈtɛəri	
-	tearable	terrible	ˈtɛərəbəl	with weak-vowel merger before /b/
-	tearer	terror	ˈtɛərə(r)	
-	vary‡	very	ˈvɛəri	
-	wary	wherry	ˈwɛəri	with wine–whine merger
‡In a New York accent, many of the words spelled with ⟨ar⟩ use /ær/.

=== Merry–Murray merger ===
The merry–Murray merger, also known as the furry–ferry merger, is a merger of /ɛ/ and /ʌ/ before /r/, with the resulting vowel being [ʌ]. It is common in the Philadelphia accent, which does not usually have the marry–merry merger; its "short a" /æ/, as in marry and its SQUARE vowel /e/ remain distinct unmerged classes before /r/. Therefore, merry and Murray are both pronounced as [ˈmʌri], but marry [ˈmæri] and Mary [ˈmeri] are distinct from this merged pair (and each other).

merry–Murray merger homophones
/ɛr/	/ʌr/	IPA	Notes
ferrier	furrier (n.)	ˈfʌriər	
Kerry	curry	ˈkʌri	
merry	Murray	ˈmʌri	
skerry	scurry	ˈskʌri	

=== Mirror–nearer and /ʊr/–/uːr/ mergers ===
The mergers of /ɪr/ and /iːr/ (as in mirror and nearer, or Sirius and serious, respectively) and /ʊr/–/uːr/ occur in North American English as a part of pre-/r/ laxing, together with the Mary–merry and horse–hoarse mergers. The phonetic outcome of the first merger is either a lax vowel [ɪ], or a somewhat raised vowel that approaches the monophthongal allophone of fleece: [i̞], often diphthongal as [ɪə ~ iə]. In the case of the /ʊr/–/uːr/ merger, it tends to approach the monophthongal variant of goose: [ʊ̝].

The mirror–nearer merger is absent from traditional, local, or non-standard accents of the Southern and Eastern United States, where nearer is pronounced with a tense monophthong [i] or a centering diphthong [iə ~ ɪə] (phonemicized as /i/ or /ɪə/, depending on whether the accent is rhotic or not), whereas mirror has a lax monophthong [ɪ].

In the case of the first merger, only a handful of minimal pairs (e.g., cirrus–serous and Sirius–serious) illustrate the contrast, in addition to morphologically distinct pairs (e.g., spirit–spear it), all of which are rendered homophonous by the merger. Indeed, the number of the words containing /ɪr/ is itself low. There are a few minimal pairs contrasting /ʊə/ and /uːə/ in conservative Received Pronunciation: dour–doer, sure–shoer and cure-queuer. Furthermore, the hurry–furry merger that occurs in most varieties of North American English results in a merger of /ʌr/ with /ɜr/, removing almost any trace of the historical foot vowel in this position. Instead, it is a simple replacement of one phoneme with another, so that the word tour /tʊr/ is perceived to contain the foot vowel, rather than the goose vowel. However, this change may not hold where morpheme boundaries apply; allowing a qualitative distinction to be maintained between the stressed vowels in tourist /ˈtʊrəst/ (a fairly close back monophthong of variable height) on the one hand, and two-wrist /ˈturɪst/ (a fully close monophthong in free variation with a narrow closing diphthong) on the other (cf. traditional RP /ˈtʊərɪst, ˈtuːrɪst/). The same applies to the mirror–nearer merger, which laxes the vowel in clearing /ˈklɪrɪŋ/ but not in key ring /ˈkirɪŋ/, cf. RP /ˈklɪərɪŋ, ˈkiːrɪŋ/. Certain words are pronounced as if they contained a morpheme boundary before /r/, notably hero /ˈhiroʊ/ and zero /ˈziroʊ/.

Some words originally containing the /uːr/ sequence are merged with either force (see cure–force merger) or, more rarely, nurse (see cure–nurse merger) instead of foot + /r/.

The mirror–nearer and /ʊr/–/uːr/ mergers are not to be confused with the fleece–near and goose–cure mergers that occur in some non-rhotic dialects before a sounded /r/ and which do not involve the lax vowels /ɪ/ and /ʊ/.

=== Merger of /ɒr/ and /ɔr/ before vowels ===
Words with a stressed /ɒ/ before intervocalic /r/ in Received Pronunciation are treated differently in different varieties of North American English. As shown in the table below, in Canadian English, all of them are pronounced with [-ɔr-], as in cord. In the accents of Philadelphia, southern New Jersey, and the Carolinas (and traditionally throughout the whole South), those words are pronounced by some with [-ɑr-], as in card and so merge with historic prevocalic /ɑr/ in words like starry. In New York City, Long Island, and the nearby parts of New Jersey, those words are pronounced with [ɒr] like in Received Pronunciation. However, the sound is met with change to /ɑr/ and so still merges with the historic prevocalic /ɑr/ in starry.

On the other hand, the traditional Eastern New England accents (especially around Boston), the words are pronounced with [-ɒr-], but the cot–caught merger still applies elsewhere. In that regard, it is the same as Canadian /ɒ/, rather than Received Pronunciation /ɒ/. Most of the rest of the United States (marked "General American" in the table), however, has a distinctive mixed system.

In accents with the horse–hoarse merger, /ɔr/ also includes the historic /oʊr/ in words such as glory and force. When an accent also features the cot–caught merger, /ɔr/ is typically analyzed as /oʊr/ to avoid postulating a separate /ɔ/ phoneme that occurs only before /r/. Therefore, both cord and glory are considered to contain the /oʊ/ phoneme in California, Canada, and elsewhere. Therefore, in accents with the horse–hoarse merger, /kɔrd/ and /koʊrd/ are different analyses of the same word cord, and there may be little to no difference in the realization of the vowel.

In the varieties of Scottish English with the cot–caught merger, the vowel is pronounced towards the [ɔ] of caught and north. It remains distinct from the [o] of force and goat because of the lack of the horse–hoarse merger.

Distribution of /ɒr/ and prevocalic /ɔːr/ by dialect
	British RP	General American	Traditional American (Note: This here refers to accents of greater New York City, greater Philadelphia, the older Southern U.S., and the older Northeastern elite. It also includes some speakers, though particularly older ones, in Eastern New England (predominantly Rhode Island) and coastal states of the modern Southern U.S.)	Canada
Only borrow, sorrow, sorry, (to)morrow	/ɒr/	/ɑːr/	/ɒr/ or /ɑːr/	/ɔːr/
Forest, Florida, historic, moral, porridge, etc.	/ɒr/	/ɔːr/	/ɒr/ or /ɑːr/	/ɔːr/
Forum, memorial, oral, storage, story, etc.	/ɔːr/	/ɔːr/	/ɔːr/	/ɔːr/

Even in the American East Coast without the split (Boston, New York City, Rhode Island, Philadelphia and some of the coastal South), some of the words in the original short-o class often show influence from other American dialects and end up with [-ɔr-] anyway. For instance, some speakers from the Northeast pronounce Florida, orange, and horrible with [-ɑr-] but foreign and origin with [-ɔr-]. The list of words affected differs from dialect to dialect and occasionally from speaker to speaker, which is an example of sound change by lexical diffusion.

Merged homophones
/ɒr/	/ɔːr/	/ɑːr/	IPA	Notes
coral	choral		ˈkɔːrəl	in General American and Canadian English
oral	aural		ˈɔːrəl	The /ɒr/ pronunciation of oral is uncommon. Speakers without the merger usually use /ɔːr/

== Mergers before historical postvocalic R ==
=== /aʊr/–/aʊər/ merger ===
The Middle English merger of the vowels with the spellings ⟨our⟩ and ⟨ower⟩ affects all modern varieties of English and causes words like sour and hour, which originally had one syllable, to have two syllables and so to rhyme with power. In accents that lack the merger, sour has one syllable, and power has two syllables. Similar mergers also occur in which hire gains a syllable and so makes it pronounced like higher, and coir gains a syllable and so makes it pronounced like coyer.

=== Card–cord merger ===
The card–cord merger, or start–north merger, is a merger of Early Modern English [ɑr] with [ɒr], which results in the homophony of pairs like card/cord, barn/born and far/for. It is roughly similar to the father–bother merger but before r. The merger is found in some Caribbean English accents, in some West Country accents in England, and in some accents of Southern American English. Areas of the United States in which the merger is most common include Central Texas, Utah, and St. Louis, but it is not dominant anywhere and is rapidly disappearing. Rhotic dialects with the card–cord merger are some of the only ones without the horse–hoarse merger; this correlation is well-documented in the United States.

start–north merger homophones
/ɑːr/	/ɒr/	IPA	Notes
arc	orc	ˈɑːrk	
are	or	ˈɑːr	
ark	orc	ˈɑːrk	
bark	bork	ˈbɑːrk	
barn	born	ˈbɑːrn	
car	cor	ˈkɑːr	
card	chord	ˈkɑːrd	
card	cord	ˈkɑːrd	
carn	corn	ˈkɑːrn	
carnie	corny	ˈkɑːrni	
dark	dork	ˈdɑːrk	
darn	dorn	ˈdɑːrn	
far	for	ˈfɑːr	
farm	form	ˈfɑːrm	
farty	forty	ˈfɑːrti	
lard	lord	ˈlɑːrd	
mart	Mort	ˈmɑːrt	
Marty	Morty	ˈmɑːrti	
spark	spork	ˈspɑːrk	
stark	stork	ˈstɑːrk	
tar	tor	ˈtɑːr	
tart	tort	ˈtɑːrt	

=== Cure–force merger ===
In Modern English, the reflexes of Early Modern English /uːr/ and /iur/ are highly susceptible to phonemic mergers with other vowels. Words belonging to that class are most commonly spelled with oor, our, ure, or eur. Examples include poor, tour, cure, Europe (words such as moor ultimately from Old English ō words). Wells refers to the class as the cure words after the keyword of the lexical set to which he assigns them.

In traditional Received Pronunciation and General American, cure words are pronounced with Received Pronunciation /ʊə/ (/ʊər/ before a vowel) and General American /ʊr/. However, those pronunciations are being replaced by other pronunciations in many accents.

In Southern England, cure words are often pronounced with /ɔː/, so moor is often pronounced /mɔː/, tour /tɔː/, and poor /pɔː/. The traditional form is much more common in Northern England. A similar merger is encountered in many varieties of American English, whose prevailing pronunciations are [oə] and [oɹ]⁓[ɔɹ], depending on whether or not the accent is rhotic. For many speakers of American English, the historical /iur/ merges with /ɜr/ after palatal consonants, as in "cure", "sure", "pure", and "mature", and merges with /ɔr/ in other environments such as in "poor" and "moor".

In Australian and New Zealand English, the centering diphthong /ʊə/ has mostly disappeared and is replaced in some words by /ʉːə/ (a sequence of two separate monophthongs) and in others by /oː/ (a long monophthong). The outcome that occurs in a particular word is not always predictable although, for example, pure, cure, and tour may rhyme with fewer and have /ʉːə/, and poor, moor, and sure rhyme with for and paw and have /oː/.

Cure–force merger homophones
/ʊə/	/ɔː/	IPA	Notes
boor	boar	ˈbɔː(r)	
boor	Boer	ˈbɔː(r)	
boor	bore	ˈbɔː(r)	
gourd	gaud	ˈɡɔːd	non-rhotic with the horse–hoarse merger
gourd	gored	ˈɡɔː(r)d	
lure	law	ˈlɔː	non-rhotic with yod-dropping and the horse–hoarse merger
lure	lore	ˈlɔː(r)	with yod-dropping
lured	laud	ˈlɔːd	non-rhotic with yod-dropping and the horse–hoarse merger
lured	lawed	ˈlɔːd	non-rhotic with yod-dropping and the horse–hoarse merger
lured	lord	ˈlɔː(r)d	with yod-dropping and the horse–hoarse merger
moor	maw	ˈmɔː	non-rhotic with the horse–hoarse merger
moor	more	ˈmɔː(r)	
poor	paw	ˈpɔː	non-rhotic with the horse–hoarse merger
poor	pore	ˈpɔː(r)	
poor	pour	ˈpɔː(r)	
spoor	spore	ˈspɔː(r)	
sure	shaw	ˈʃɔː	non-rhotic with the horse–hoarse merger
sure	shore	ˈʃɔː(r)	
tour	taw	ˈtɔː	non-rhotic with the horse–hoarse merger
tour	tor	ˈtɔː(r)	with the horse–hoarse merger
tour	tore	ˈtɔː(r)	
toured	toward	ˈtɔː(r)d	when toward is not pronounced /təˈwɔːrd/
your	yaw	ˈjɔː	non-rhotic with the horse–hoarse merger
your	yore	ˈjɔː(r)	
you're	yaw	ˈjɔː	non-rhotic with the horse–hoarse merger
you're	yore	ˈjɔː(r)	

=== Cure–nurse merger ===
In East Anglia, a cure–nurse merger in which words like fury merge to the sound of furry [ɜː] is common, especially after palatal and palatoalveolar consonants, so sure is often pronounced [ʃɜː], which is also a common single-word merger in American English in which the word sure is often /ʃɜr/. Also, yod-dropping may apply, which yields pronunciations such as [pɜː] for pure. Other pronunciations in the accents that merge cure and fir include /pjɜː(r)/ pure, /ˈk(j)ɜːriəs/ curious, /ˈb(j)ɜːroʊ/ bureau and /ˈm(j)ɜːrəl/ mural. For some U.S. speakers /j/ can be maintained, dropped, or coalesced as it would in other contexts; often dropped after alveolar consonants (e.g. /ɪnˈdɜːr/ endure, /ˈzɜːrɪk/ Zurich) but maintained after other consonants (e.g. /pjɜːr/ pure, /ˈkjɜːr/ cure).

Cure–nurse merger homophones
/jʊə(r)/	/ɜː(r)/	IPA	Notes
cure	cur	ˈkɜː(r)	with yod-dropping
cure	curr	ˈkɜː(r)	with yod-dropping
cured	curd	ˈkɜː(r)d	with yod-dropping
cured	curred	ˈkɜː(r)d	with yod-dropping
fury	furry	ˈfɜːri	with yod-dropping
pure	per	ˈpɜː(r)	with yod-dropping
pure	purr	ˈpɜː(r)	with yod-dropping

=== /aɪər/–/ɑr/ merger ===
Varieties of Southern American English, Midland American English and High Tider English may merge words like fire and far or tired and tarred towards of the second words: /ɑr/. That results in a tire–tar merger, but tower is kept distinct.

==== /aɪə/–/aʊə/–/ɑː/ merger ====
Some accents of southern British English, including many types of Received Pronunciation and in Norwich, have mergers of the vowels in words like tire, tar (which already merged with /ɑː/, as in palm), and tower. Thus, the triphthong /aʊə/ of tower merges with the /aɪə/ of tire (both surface as diphthongal [ɑə] or with the /ɑː/ of tar through triphthong smoothing). Some speakers merge all three sounds, so tower, tire, and tar are all pronounced [tɑː].

Tar–tire–tower merger homophones
/ɑʊə/	/aɪə/	/ɑː(r)/	/ɑː/	IPA
Bauer/bower	buyer	bar	baa/bah	/ˈbɑː/
coward/cowered	-	card	-	/ˈkɑːd/
cower	-	car	ka	/ˈkɑː/
dowel	dial	-	dahl	/ˈdɑːl/
-	fire	far	fah	/ˈfɑː/
flour/flower	flyer	-	-	/ˈflɑː/
hour/our	ire	ar/are	ah	/ˈɑː/
Howard	hired	hard	ha-ed	/ˈhɑːd/
how're	hire	har	ha	/ˈhɑː/
lour	lyre	lar	la	/ˈlɑː/
-	mire	mar	ma	/ˈmɑː/
owl	aisle/I'll/isle	arle	aal	/ˈɑːl/
-	pious	parse	pass	/ˈpɑːs/
power	pyre	par	pa	/ˈpɑː/
scour	-	scar	ska	/ˈskɑː/
shower	shire/shyer	-	shah	/ˈʃɑː/
showered	shired	shard	-	/ˈʃɑːd/
sour	sire	Saar/sigher	-	/ˈsɑː/
-	spier/spire	spar	spa	/ˈspɑː/
tower	tier/tire/tyre	tar	ta	/ˈtɑː/
trowel	trial	-	-	/ˈtrɑːl/
vowel	vial	-	Vaal	/ˈvɑːl/

=== Horse–hoarse merger ===
The horse–hoarse merger, or north–force merger, is the merger of the vowels /ɔː/ and /oʊ/ before historic /r/, which makes word pairs like horse–hoarse, for–four, war–wore, or–oar, morning–mourning pronounced the same. Historically, the north class belonged to the Early Modern English /ɒ/ phoneme (containing the same vowel as lot), while the force class was /oː/ (containing the same vowel as go).

The merger now occurs in most varieties of English. Accents that have resisted the merger include most Scottish and Caribbean accents as well as some African American, Southern American, Indian, Irish, older Maine, South Wales (excluding Cardiff), Northern English (particularly Manchester), and West Midlands accents.

In the non-rhotic British accents that make the distinction, north is typically merged with thought, while the phonological status of force varies. The areas of Wales that make the distinction merge it with the monophthongal variety of goat: /ˈfoːs/ (those accents lack the toe–tow merger). In the accents of Northern England that lack the merger, force is not merged with any other lexical set; it is pronounced around [ɔː] while thought-north is a more open [ɒː]. In the West Midlands, force corresponds to either goat + comma: /ˈfʌʊəs/ or a separate /oə/ phoneme: /ˈfoəs/. The words belonging to each set vary to an extent region to region, for example from Port Talbot tend to use force, instead of the traditional north, in forceps, fortress, important and importance.

The distinction was once present in the speech of southern England, the NORTH vowel being sounded as /ɔː/ and the FORCE vowel as the centring diphthong /ɔə/. For many speakers, however, as noted by Henry Sweet, this contrast had by 1890 become constricted to word-final positions if the following word began with a consonant (so 'horse' and 'hoarse' had thus become homophonous, but not 'morceau' and 'more so'). In his 1918 Outline of English Phonetics, Daniel Jones described the distinction as optional, but he still considered it to be frequently heard in 1962; the two vowels are differentiated in the first (1884–1928) and second (1989) editions of the Oxford English Dictionary with the caveat that in most varieties of southern British pronunciation the two had become identical; no distinction is drawn in the third edition, as well as in most modern British dictionaries (Chambers being a notable exception). John C. Wells wrote in 1997 that the distinction had become obsolete in RP.

In the United States, the merger is now widespread everywhere but is quite recent in some parts of the country. For example, fieldwork performed in the 1930s by Kurath and McDavid showed the contrast to be robustly present in the speech of the entire Atlantic coast, as well as Vermont, northern and western New York State, Virginia, central and southern West Virginia, and North Carolina. However, by the 1990s, surveys showed those areas had completely or almost completely undergone the merger. Even in areas in which the distinction is still made, the acoustic difference between the [ɔɹ] of horse and the [oɹ] of hoarse was found to be rather small for many speakers. Some American speakers retain the original length distinction but merge the quality. Therefore, hoarse [hɔːrs] is pronounced longer than horse [hɔrs].

In the 2006 study, most white participants in only these American cities still resisted the merger: Wilmington, North Carolina; Mobile, Alabama; and Portland, Maine. A 2013 study of Portland, however, found the merger to have been established "at all age levels". In the 2006 study, even St. Louis, Missouri, which traditionally maintained the horse–hoarse distinction so strongly that it instead merged card and cord, showed that only 50% of the participants still maintained the distinction. The same pattern (a horse–hoarse distinction and a card–cord merger) also exists in a minority of speakers in Texas and Utah. New Orleans prominently shows much variability regarding the merger, including some speakers with no merger at all. Black Americans are rapidly undergoing the merger but are also less likely to do so than white Americans, with a little over half of the 2006 study's black participants maintaining the distinction nationwide.

In some Indian, Welsh, and Southern American dialects, the distinction between north and force may be maintained through the presence or absence of /r/, with horse being /hɔːs/ and hoarse being /hɔːrs/.

The two groups of words merged by the rule are called the lexical sets north (including horse) and force (including hoarse) by Wells (1982).

In dialects that maintain the distinction between the two phonemes, north is indicated almost exclusively by the spellings or, aur and ar (when preceded by /w/), as in horse, aural, war, while force is generally indicated by the spellings oar, ore, our and oor, as in hoarse, wore, four, door.

However, force can also sometimes occur in words with the or spelling. This is usually in one or more of the following circumstances:

- When the vowel immediately follows a labial consonant, /m p b f v w (ʍ)/, as in force itself.
- In past participles in -orn with corresponding past tense forms in -ore, as in torn, or words made from ones with the force vowel.
- When the /r/ is followed by a vowel within the same morpheme, as in words like glory and flora.

However, it does not occur in all words that fit the above criteria. The following table lists some words irregularly with the force sound, rather than north, with the cases that make them so and regular north words by comparison. Note that in non-standard accents many words can shift their pronunciation without changing diaphonemes due to lexical diffusion.

Irregular force words
Force class	North class	Variable	Type
afford, borne, divorce, Borneo, deport, export, fjord, force, ford, forge, fort, forth, import, porcelain, porch, pork, port, portal, portend, portent, porter, portrait, proportion, report, sport, support	border, born, California, cavort, cyborg, for, forceps, forfeit, fork, form, fortify, fortunate, fortune, fortress, forty, forward, importunate, Morgan, morgue, Mormon, morning, morph, morpheme, morphine, morse, morsel, mortal, mortar, porn, porpoise, quart, reform, remorse, spork, sward, swarm, swarthy, war, warble, ward, warden, wardrobe, warlock, warm, warmth, warn, warp, Warsaw, wart	important (Note: Traditionally north in General American; usually force in other accents)	after labial consonant
fourteen, shorn, sworn, torn, worn	born, forty		derived from force word
adorable, angora, aurora, borax, boron, censorious, choral, Dora, euphoria, fedora, flora, floral, gloria, glorious, glory, gory, Gregorian, historian, laborious, memorial, meritorious, moratorium, moron, Nora, notorious, oral, oriole, pictorial, porous, pretorian, stentorian, story, thorax, thorium, torus, Tory, uxorious, Victoria(n)	aura, aural, aureole, Laura, Taurus		followed by vowel within the same morpheme
horde, sword			sui generis

north–force merger homophones
FORCE /oə/	NORTH /ɔː/	IPA	Notes
board	baud	ˈbɔːd	non-rhotic
board	bawd	ˈbɔːd	non-rhotic
boarder	border	ˈbɔː(r)də(r)	
bored	baud	ˈbɔːd	non-rhotic
bored	bawd	ˈbɔːd	non-rhotic
borne	bawn	ˈbɔːn	non-rhotic
borne	born	ˈbɔː(r)n	
Bourne	bawn	ˈbɔːn	non-rhotic
Bourne	born	ˈbɔː(r)n	
bourse	boss	ˈbɔːs	non-rhotic with lot–cloth split
core	caw	ˈkɔː	non-rhotic
cored	cawed	ˈkɔːd	non-rhotic
cored	chord	ˈkɔː(r)d	
cored	cord	ˈkɔː(r)d	
cores	cause	ˈkɔːz	non-rhotic
corps	caw	ˈkɔː	non-rhotic
court	caught	ˈkɔːt	non-rhotic
door	daw	ˈdɔː	non-rhotic
floor	flaw	ˈflɔː	non-rhotic
fore	for	ˈfɔː(r)	
four	for	ˈfɔː(r)	
fort	fought	ˈfɔːt	non-rhotic
gored	gaud	ˈɡɔːd	non-rhotic
hoarse	horse	ˈhɔː(r)s	
hoarse	hoss	ˈhɔːs	non-rhotic with lot–cloth split
lore	law	ˈlɔː	non-rhotic
more	maw	ˈmɔː	non-rhotic
mourning	morning	ˈmɔː(r)nɪŋ	
oar	awe	ˈɔː	non-rhotic
oar	or	ˈɔː(r)	
ore	awe	ˈɔː	non-rhotic
ore	or	ˈɔː(r)	
oral	aural	ˈɔːrəl	
oriole	aureole	ˈɔːrioʊl	
pore	paw	ˈpɔː	non-rhotic
pores	pause	ˈpɔːz	non-rhotic
pour	paw	ˈpɔː	non-rhotic
roar	raw	ˈrɔː	non-rhotic
shore	shaw	ˈʃɔː	non-rhotic
shorn	Sean	ˈʃɔːn	non-rhotic
shorn	Shawn	ˈʃɔːn	non-rhotic
soar	saw	ˈsɔː	non-rhotic
soared	sawed	ˈsɔːd	non-rhotic
sore	saw	ˈsɔː	non-rhotic
source	sauce	ˈsɔːs	non-rhotic
sword	sawed	ˈsɔːd	non-rhotic
tore	taw	ˈtɔː	non-rhotic
tore	tor	ˈtɔː(r)	
torus	Taurus	ˈtɔːrəs	
wore	war	ˈwɔː(r)	
worn	warn	ˈwɔː(r)n	
yore	yaw	ˈjɔː	non-rhotic

=== Near–square merger ===
The near–square merger or cheer–chair merger is the merger of the Early Modern English sequences /iːr/ and /ɛːr/, as well as the /eːr/ between them, and is found in some accents of Modern English. Many speakers in New Zealand merge them towards the near vowel, but some speakers in East Anglia and South Carolina merge them towards the square vowel. The merger is widespread in Caribbean English, including Jamaican English.

Near–square merger homophones
/ɪə(r)/	/eə(r)/	IPA (using ⟨ɪə⟩ for the merged vowel)	Notes
beard	Baird	ˈbɪə(r)d	
beard	bared	ˈbɪə(r)d	
beer	bare	ˈbɪə(r)	
beer	bear	ˈbɪə(r)	
cheer	chair	ˈtʃɪə(r)	
clear	Claire	ˈklɪə(r)	
dear	dare	ˈdɪə(r)	
deer	dare	ˈdɪə(r)	
ear	air	ˈɪə(r)	
ear	ere	ˈɪə(r)	
ear	heir	ˈɪə(r)	
fear	fair	ˈfɪə(r)	
fear	fare	ˈfɪə(r)	
fleer	flair	ˈflɪə(r)	
fleer	flare	ˈflɪə(r)	
hear	hair	ˈhɪə(r)	
hear	hare	ˈhɪə(r)	
here	hair	ˈhɪə(r)	
here	hare	ˈhɪə(r)	
leer	lair	ˈlɪə(r)	
leered	laird	ˈlɪə(r)d	
mere	mare	ˈmɪə(r)	
near	nare	ˈnɪə(r)	
peer	pair	ˈpɪə(r)	
peer	pare	ˈpɪə(r)	
peer	pear	ˈpɪə(r)	
pier	pair	ˈpɪə(r)	
pier	pare	ˈpɪə(r)	
pier	pear	ˈpɪə(r)	
rear	rare	ˈrɪə(r)	
shear	share	ˈʃɪə(r)	
sheer	share	ˈʃɪə(r)	
sneer	snare	ˈsnɪə(r)	
spear	spare	ˈspɪə(r)	
tear (weep)	tare	ˈtɪə(r)	
tear (weep)	tear (rip)	ˈtɪə(r)	
tier	tare	ˈtɪə(r)	
tier	tear (rip)	ˈtɪə(r)	
weary	wary	ˈwɪəri	
weir	ware	ˈwɪə(r)	
weir	wear	ˈwɪə(r)	
we're	ware	ˈwɪə(r)	
we're	wear	ˈwɪə(r)	

=== Nurse mergers ===
Common in a vast majority of modern English dialects worldwide is the merger of as many as five Early Modern English vowels (/ɛ/, /ɛː/, /ə/, /ɪ/, and /ʊ/) into /ɜ/ when followed by an /r/ before a consonant or at the end of a syllable. Thus, the vowels in words like fir, fur, and fern are the same in almost all modern accents of English, therefore sometimes called the fern–fir–fur merger. John C. Wells briefly calls it the NURSE merger. When another vowel follows, these are often distinct; contrast the vowels in merry, hurry, weary, mirror, and furry (when all distinct, /mɛri/, /hʌri/, /wɪəri/, /mɪrər/, /fɜːri/); see Mary–marry–merry merger, mirror–nearer merger, and hurry–furry merger for details. The major exceptions to most of the nurse mergers are Scottish English and older Irish English, which also do not have mergers of vowels before /r/ when followed by another vowel. What Scottish and older Irish English have in common is rhoticity without r-colored vowels, meaning that /r/ ([ɾ]; see pronunciation of English /r/) is used at the end of a syllable.

Words and names with historic /ɛːr/ are spelled ⟨ear⟩ in closed syllables as in earn, earth or pearl, while ⟨are, air, eir, ayer⟩ in words which have stayed distinct (see both the meet–meat and pane–pain mergers), and they include the function words her and were. The relevant words and names with historic /ɛr/ are ⟨er⟩ in a stressed syllable, historic /ʊr/ are spelled as a stressed ⟨ur, or, our⟩, and /ɪr/ is any ⟨ir⟩ or ⟨yr⟩. The diaphoneme /ər/ originates from unstressed vowels before /r/ and was not otherwise distinct.

Scottish English and rural Irish English dialects both use sequences of a vowel then /r/ rather than r-colored vowels, and both lack the foot–strut split; which result in comparable developments. However, the actual realizations of the retained Nurse vowels vary. Also, while most of Scottish English has some distinction, more prestigious/younger Irish English realizes the Nurse merger as [ɝː]. The table below summarizes the overall differences:

Retained NURSE vowel table
EME diaphoneme	Scottish English	older and rural Irish English
/ɛr/ (spelled ⟨er⟩ or ⟨ear⟩, like fern)	/ɛr/ or /er/	
/ɛːr/ (spelled ⟨are, air, ear⟩, like fare)	/ɛr/ or /er/	
/ɪr/ (spelled ⟨ir⟩, like fir)	/ɪr/ (often /ər/)	/ɛr/ or /er/ (however, /ʊr/ after labials, /t/, /d/, /t̪/, /d̪/)
/ʊr/ (spelled ⟨ur⟩, like fur)	/ʌr/	/ʊr/
/ər/ (unstressed, like letter)	/ər/	

In Scottish English, mid front /ɛːr/ and /ɛr/ are merged into /er/, paralleling the mid back vowel horse–hoarse merger, which Scottish English lacks. The vowel in fir /ɪr/ is usually distinct, but is more liable to merge than /ər/ because their non-rhoticized equivalents /ɪ/ and /ə/ belong to the same phoneme; this parallels the hurry–furry merger. All EME /ʊ/ became /ʌ/, which included before /r/. The /ər/ (letter), /er/ (term) and /ʌr/ (fur) vowels are fully distinct from each other.

For rural and very conservative Irish English, /ɪr/ (in whirl) merges entirely with /ɛːr/ (in earl), sometimes merging again with /ɛr/. The merged /ɛːr/ merges again with /ʊr/ after labials and coronal plosives (including /θ/ and /ð/ becoming /t̪/ and /d̪/) in many common words, but this is no longer productive.

Nurse merger homophones
/ɛr/~/ər/	/eːr/	/ɪr/	/ʌr/	IPA	Notes
Bern	-	-	burn	ˈbɜː(r)n	
Bert	-	-	Burt	ˈbɜː(r)t	
-	-	bird	burred	ˈbɜː(r)d	
Bertie	-	birdie	-	ˈbɜː(r)ɾi	with flapping
berth	-	birth	-	ˈbɜː(r)θ	
-	earn	-	urn	ˈɜː(r)n	
Ernest	earnest	-	-	ˈɜː(r)nɪst	
Ferd	-	-	furred	ˈfɜː(r)d	
herd	heard	-	Hurd	ˈhɜː(r)d	
herl	-	-	hurl	ˈhɜː(r)l	
-	Hearst	-	hurst	ˈhɜː(r)st	
-	-	fir	fur	ˈfɜː(r)	
hertz; Hertz	-	-	hurts	ˈhɜː(r)ts	
kerb	-	-	curb	ˈkɜː(r)b	
mer-	-	myrrh	murr	ˈmɜː(r)	
-	-	mirk	murk	ˈmɜː(r)k	
per	-	-	purr	ˈpɜː(r)	
Perl	pearl	-	-	ˈpɜː(r)l	
tern	-	-	turn	ˈtɜː(r)n	
were	-	whirr	-	ˈwɜː(r)	with wine–whine merger
-	-	whirl	whorl	ˈwɜː(r)l	
-	-	whirled	world	ˈwɜː(r)ld	with wine–whine merger

=== Nurse–near merger ===
Some older Southern American English varieties and some of England's West Country dialects have a partial merger of nurse–near. They generally pronounce near as /njɜr/, which rhymes near with a nurse word like sir or fur (compare general English realisations of cue and coo). Words such as beard are then pronounced as /bjɜrd/. Usual word pairs like beer and burr are still distinguished as /bjɜr/ and /bɜr/. However, /j/ is dropped after a consonant cluster (as in queer) or a palato-alveolar consonant (as in cheer), likely because of phonotactic constraints, which then results in a merger with nurse: /kwɜr/, /tʃɜr/.

There is evidence that the African American Vernacular English in Memphis, Tennessee, merges both /ɪr/ and /ɛər/ with /ɜr/, so here and hair are both pronounced the same as the strong pronunciation of her.

=== Nurse–north merger ===
The nurse–north merger (words like perk being pronounced like pork) involves the merger of /ɜː/ with /ɔː/ and occurs in broadest Geordie.

Some thought words (roughly those spelled with a) have a distinct [aː] vowel in broad Geordie. Therefore, the merger involves only some of the words corresponding to historical /ɔː/ in Received Pronunciation.

Nurse–north merger homophones
/ɜː/	/ɔː/	IPA	Notes
bird	board	ˈbɔːd	
bird	bored	ˈbɔːd	
burn	born	ˈbɔːn	
burn	borne	ˈbɔːn	
curse	coarse	ˈkɔːs	
curse	course	ˈkɔːs	
err	oar	ˈɔː	
err	or	ˈɔː	
err	ore	ˈɔː	
fir	for	ˈfɔː	the weak form of for is distinct: /fə/
fir	fore	ˈfɔː	
fir	four	ˈfɔː	
fur	for	ˈfɔː	the weak form of for is distinct: /fə/
fur	fore	ˈfɔː	
fur	four	ˈfɔː	
heard	hoard	ˈhɔːd	
heard	horde	ˈhɔːd	
her	hoar	ˈhɔː	
her	whore	ˈhɔː	
herd	hoard	ˈhɔːd	
herd	horde	ˈhɔːd	
occur	a core	əˈkɔː	
occur	a corps	əˈkɔː	
occurred	a chord	əˈkɔːd	
occurred	a cord	əˈkɔːd	
occurred	accord	əˈkɔːd	
perk	pork	ˈpɔːk	
purr	pore	ˈpɔː	
purr	pour	ˈpɔː	
sir	soar	ˈsɔː	
sir	sore	ˈsɔː	
stir	store	ˈstɔː	
stirred	stored	ˈstɔːd	
Turk	torque	ˈtɔːk	
turn	torn	ˈtɔːn	
were	war	ˈwɔː	
were	wore	ˈwɔː	
word	ward	ˈwɔːd	
worm	warm	ˈwɔːm	

=== Square–nurse merger ===
The square–nurse merger, or fair–fur merger, is a merger of /ɛə(r)/ with /ɜː(r)/ that occurs in some accents like Scouse, various other dialects within historic Lancashire, Teesside, Hull, the newer Dublin, and the Belfast accents.

Scouse, the accent of Liverpool and the Merseyside area, is the dialect with which the merger is most stereotypically associated. The most common realization in modern Scouse is [eː], but [ɛː] and [ɪː] are also possible. It is also found in many neighbouring regions of historic Lancashire, such as Bolton, Wigan and Blackburn, where the quality is generally a more central [ɜː]~[ɵː]. Shorrocks (1999) reports that in the dialect of Bolton, Greater Manchester, the two sets are generally merged to [ɵ:], but some nurse words such as first have a short [ɵ].

The merger can also be found among some speakers in the Teesside conurbation and the Humberside (Hull - East Riding of Yorkshire - North East Lincolnshire) area with a quality intermediate between [ɛː] and [ɜː].

Thorne (2003) reports that the square–nurse merger also occurs in Birmingham, remarking the merger as being "another principally northern characteristic". Tennant (1982) reports nurse as being pronounced as /eə/ - which would lead square and nurse as being pronounced the opposite way of their RP pronunciation.

The merger is found in some varieties of African American Vernacular English and is pronounced [ɚ]: "A recent development reported for some AAE (in Memphis, but likely found elsewhere)." This is exemplified in Chingy's song "Right Thurr", in which the merger is spelled in the title.

Labov (1994) also reports such a merger in some western parts of the United States "with a high degree of r constriction".

Square–nurse merger homophones
/ɛə(r)/	/ɜː(r)/	IPA (using ⟨ɜː⟩ for the merged vowel)	Notes
air	err	ˈɜː(r)	
Baird	bird	ˈbɜː(r)d	
Baird	burd	ˈbɜː(r)d	
Baird	burred	ˈbɜː(r)d	
bairn	burn	ˈbɜː(r)n	
bare	burr	ˈbɜː(r)	
bared	bird	ˈbɜː(r)d	
bared	burd	ˈbɜː(r)d	
bared	burred	ˈbɜː(r)d	
barely	burly	ˈbɜː(r)li	
bear	burr	ˈbɜː(r)	
Blair	blur	ˈblɜː(r)	
blare	blur	ˈblɜː(r)	
cairn	kern	ˈkɜː(r)n	
care	cur	ˈkɜː(r)	
care	curr	ˈkɜː(r)	
cared	curd	ˈkɜː(r)d	
cared	curred	ˈkɜː(r)d	
cared	Kurd	ˈkɜː(r)d	
chair	chirr	ˈtʃɜː(r)	
ere	err	ˈɜː(r)	
fair	fir	ˈfɜː(r)	
fair	fur	ˈfɜː(r)	
fairy	furry	ˈfɜːri	
fare	fir	ˈfɜː(r)	
fare	fur	ˈfɜː(r)	
hair	her	ˈhɜː(r)	
haired	heard	ˈhɜː(r)d	
haired	herd	ˈhɜː(r)d	
hare	her	ˈhɜː(r)	
heir	err	ˈɜː(r)	
mare	myrrh	ˈmɜː(r)	
pair	per	ˈpɜː(r)	
pair	purr	ˈpɜː(r)	
pare	per	ˈpɜː(r)	
pare	purr	ˈpɜː(r)	
pear	per	ˈpɜː(r)	
pear	purr	ˈpɜː(r)	
spare	spur	ˈspɜː(r)	
stair	stir	ˈstɜː(r)	
stare	stir	ˈstɜː(r)	
ware	were	ˈwɜː(r)	
ware	whir	ˈwɜː(r)	with wine–whine merger
wear	were	ˈwɜː(r)	
wear	whir	ˈwɜː(r)	with wine–whine merger
where	were	ˈwɜː(r)	
where	whir	ˈwɜː(r)	

== See also ==
- Phonological history of English
- Phonological history of English vowels
- Coil–curl merger
- English phonology
- History of English

== Sources ==
- Bauer, Laurie; Warren, Paul (2004). "New Zealand English: phonology". In Schneider, Edgar W.; Burridge, Kate; Kortmann, Bernd; Mesthrie, Rajend; Upton, Clive (eds.). A handbook of varieties of English. Vol. 1: Phonology. Mouton de Gruyter. pp. 580–602. ISBN 3-11-017532-0.
- Bauer, Laurie; Warren, Paul; Bardsley, Dianne; Kennedy, Marianna; Major, George (2007). "New Zealand English". Journal of the International Phonetic Association. 37 (1): 97–102. doi:10.1017/S0025100306002830.
- Clark, Urszula (2004). "The English West Midlands: phonology". In Schneider, Edgar W.; Burridge, Kate; Kortmann, Bernd; Mesthrie, Rajend; Upton, Clive (eds.). A handbook of varieties of English. Vol. 1: Phonology. Mouton de Gruyter. pp. 134–162. ISBN 3-11-017532-0.
- Coupland, Nikolas; Thomas, Alan R., eds. (1990). English in Wales: Diversity, Conflict, and Change. Multilingual Matters Ltd. ISBN 978-1-85359-032-0.
- Hammond, Michael (1999). The Phonology of English. Oxford: Oxford University Press. ISBN 0-19-823797-9.
- Hay, Jennifer; Maclagan, Margaret; Gordon, Elizabeth (2008). "2. Phonetics and Phonology". New Zealand English. Dialects of English. Edinburgh: Edinburgh University Press. ISBN 978-0-7486-2529-1.
- Kenyon, John S. (1951). American Pronunciation (10th ed.). Ann Arbor, Michigan: George Wahr Publishing Company. ISBN 1-884739-08-3.
- Kurath, Hans; McDavid, Raven I. (1961). The Pronunciation of English in the Atlantic States. Ann Arbor: University of Michigan Press. ISBN 0-8173-0129-1.
- Labov, William; Ash, Sharon; Boberg, Charles (2006). The Atlas of North American English. Berlin: Mouton-de Gruyter. pp. 187–208. ISBN 3-11-016746-8.
- Shitara, Yuko (1993). "A survey of American pronunciation preferences" (PDF). Speech Hearing and Language. 7: 201–232.
- Wells, John C. (1982). Accents of English. Vol. 1: An Introduction (pp. i–xx, 1–278), Vol. 2: The British Isles (pp. i–xx, 279–466), Vol. 3: Beyond the British Isles (pp. i–xx, 467–674). Cambridge University Press. doi:10.1017/CBO9780511611759, doi:10.1017/CBO9780511611766. ISBN 0-52129719-2, 0-52128540-2, 0-52128541-0.
