= New England English =

Variety of American English

- Region: New England
- Language family: Indo-European: Germanic; West Germanic; Ingvaeonic; Anglo–Frisian; Anglic; English; North American English; American English; New England English
- Early forms: Old English: Middle English; Early Modern English
- Dialects: Eastern New England English, Western New England English
- Writing system: Latin (English alphabet)

Language codes
- ISO 639-3: –

New England English is, collectively, the various distinct dialects and varieties of American English originating in the New England area. Most of eastern and central New England once spoke the "Yankee dialect", some of whose accent features still remain in Eastern New England today, such as "R-dropping" (though this and other features are now receding among younger speakers). Accordingly, one linguistic division of New England is into Eastern versus Western New England English, as defined in the 1939 Linguistic Atlas of New England and the 2006 Atlas of North American English (ANAE). The ANAE further argues for a division between Northern versus Southern New England English, especially on the basis of the cot–caught merger and /ɑr/ fronting (applying twice, for example, in the phrase Park the car). The ANAE also categorizes the strongest differentiated New England accents into four combinations of the above dichotomies, simply defined as follows:

- Northeastern New England English shows non-rhoticity, the cot–caught merger, and strong /ɑr/ fronting. It centers on Boston, Massachusetts, extending into New Hampshire and coastal Maine.
- Southeastern New England English shows non-rhoticity, no cot–caught merger, and no strong /ɑr/ fronting. It centers on Providence, Rhode Island and the Narragansett Bay.
- Northwestern New England English shows rhoticity, the cot–caught merger, and strong /ɑr/ fronting. It centers on Vermont.
- Southwestern New England English shows rhoticity, no (or a transitional state of the) cot–caught merger, and no strong /ɑr/ fronting. It centers around the Hartford–Springfield area of Connecticut and western Massachusetts.

== Overview ==
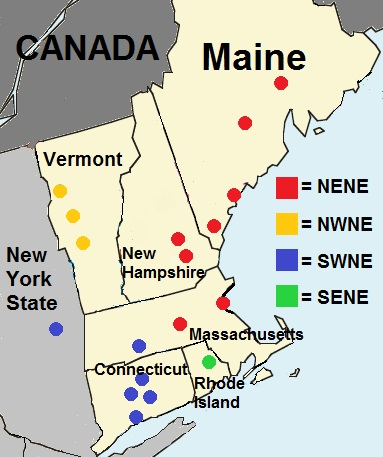
Northeastern (NENE), Northwestern (NWNE), Southwestern (SWNE), and Southeastern (SENE) New England English represented here, as mapped by the Atlas of North American English on the basis of data from major cities Dialect definitions NENE is defined by: Widespread non-rhoticity; Full cot–caught merger → [ɒ~ɑ]; Full or transitional horse–hoarse merger; No father–bother merger: [ä~a] vs. [ɒ~ɑ]; /ɑr/ → [ä(ɹ)~a(ɹ)]; NWNE is defined by: Widespread rhoticity; Full cot–caught merger → [ɑ]; Full horse–hoarse merger; Full father–bother merger → [ɑ~ä]; /ɑr/ → [äɹ~aɹ]; SWNE is defined by: Widespread rhoticity; No or transitional cot–caught merger: [ɑ~ä] vs. [ɒ]; Full horse–hoarse merger; Full father–bother merger → [ɑ~ä]; /ɑr/ → [ɑɹ]; SENE is defined by: Widespread non-rhoticity; No cot–caught merger: [ɑ~ä] vs. [ɔə]; Full horse–hoarse merger; Full father–bother merger → [ɑ~ä]; /ɑr/ → [ɑ(ɹ)]

=== Phonology ===
==== Distinctions ====
New England English is not a single American dialect, but a collective term for a number of dialects and varieties that are close geographic neighbors within New England, but which differ on a spectrum that broadly divides New England English into a unique north versus south (specifically, a northern merger of the LOT and THOUGHT vowels, versus a southern merger of the LOT and PALM vowels), as well as a unique east versus west (specifically, an eastern pronunciation of the "r" sound only before vowels, versus a western pronunciation of all "r" sounds). Regarding the former feature, all of northern New England (most famously including Boston, but going as far southeast as Cape Cod and as far north as central Maine) historically merges the open and open-mid back rounded vowels (so that, for instance, pond and pawned are pronounced the same, which is commonly called the cot–caught merger), while southern coastal New England (including Rhode Island) historically maintains a noticeable distinction between these two vowels. Regarding the second feature, all of Eastern New England is historically non-rhotic (famously pronouncing "car" like "kah"), while all of Western New England is historically rhotic (or "r-ful"). Therefore, four combinations of these two features are possible, and coincidentally all four exist among New England English speakers, largely correlated with the exact geographic quadrant in New England in which a speaker was raised.

==== Commonalities ====
All of New England raises the tongue in the first element of the diphthong /aɪ/ before voiceless consonants, so writer has a raised vowel, with this often being its only distinguishing feature versus rider. Eastern New England, specifically, also raises the first element of /aʊ/ before voiceless consonants (commonly known as Canadian raising).

The local dialects of New England are also known for commonly pronouncing the unstressed sequences /tɪŋ/ and /tən/ (for example, found in "sitting" /ˈsɪtɪŋ/ or "Britain" /ˈbrɪtən/) with a glottal [ʔn̩]. While this form of t-glottalization (especially the /tən/ form) is found throughout the country (typical U.S. pronunciation of "mountain" as [ˈmaʊnʔn̩]), a realization with a full schwa vowel [ʔən] is also a variant sometimes observed particularly among New Englanders, with reportings for instance in New Hampshire, Vermont, Connecticut, and Massachusetts. It may, however, be a younger pronunciation variant nationwide (also reported in places as diverse as Utah, California, and New Jersey).

The extent that speakers raise the tongue in the "short a" vowel, or TRAP vowel, varies in New England; however, across the board, New Englanders demonstrate a definite "nasal" short-a system, in which the vowel is always raised the absolute strongest whenever occurring before the nasal consonants /m/ and /n/ (so that, pan, for example, nearly approaches the sound of the word paean). In all of New England except Rhode Island, the short a may also be somewhat raised in many other environments, similar to the Great Lakes region.

The lack of the weak vowel merger is a feature of more traditional New England English, making Lenin /ˈlɛnɪn/ distinct from Lennon /ˈlɛnən/, and rabbit /ˈræbɪt/ fail to rhyme with abbott /ˈæbət/. Contrarily, in General American English, the first two words are homophonous as [ˈlɛnɨn], whereas the latter two words are perfect rhymes: [ˈɹæbɨt, ˈæbɨt].

Certain words have a tendency to use distinct phonemes when compared against the rest of the country: for example, aunt as /ɑːnt/, the noun route as /ruːt/, and syrup as /ˈsiːrəp/.

=== Vocabulary ===
The following terms originate from and are used commonly and nearly exclusively throughout New England:

- grinder for sub, a long, large sandwich (with Italian sandwich specific to Maine English)
- hamburg as a largely older term for hamburger or hamburger meat
- package store or packie for liquor store (predominant in Boston and Southern New England English)
- tag sale for garage sale or yard sale (predominant in Southwestern New England English)
- rotary for traffic circle or roundabout
- wicked is used as an intensifier word, common before adjectives or adverbs (predominant in Northern, Central, and Eastern New England English, famously Boston).

As in the rest of the Northeast, sneakers is the primary term for athletic shoes, tractor trailer for semi-trailer truck, cellar is a common alternative for basement, brook is common for stream, and soda is any sweet and bubbly non-alcoholic drink, though there are still some remnants of the older "tonic". Many Boston-originating local terms have dispersed throughout Eastern New England and, prominently, all the rest of Massachusetts.

== Eastern New England English ==
Eastern New England English encompasses Boston and Maine accents, and, according to some definitions, the distinct Rhode Island accent. All Eastern New England English is famous for non-rhoticity, meaning it drops the r sound everywhere except before a vowel: thus, in words like car, card, fear, and chowder. The phrase Park the car in Harvard Yard—dialectally transcribed [pʰak ðə ˈkʰa(ɹ)‿ɪn ˈhavəd ˈjad]—is commonly used as a shibboleth, or speech indicator, for the non-rhotic Eastern New England dialect running from Boston north to Maine, and as far west as Worcester, which contrasts with the rhotic dialects in Western New England and the vast remainder of North America. In all of Eastern New England except Rhode Island, words like caught and cot are pronounced identically (both are often rounded, thus: [kʰɒt]), because those two vowel sounds have fully merged. A phenomenon called Canadian raising occurs throughout Eastern New England, causing writer to have a different stressed vowel sound than rider, and, particularly unique, for the verb house to have a different vowel sound than the noun house. The vowels /aʊ/ and /u/ have relatively back starting positions. The horse–hoarse distinction is still present to some extent in some areas, as well as the Mary–marry–merry distinction.

== Western New England English ==
Western New England English encompasses the accents of Vermont, western Massachusetts, and Connecticut. They are largely perceived as General American accents in the following five ways. They are fully rhotic, meaning all r sounds are pronounced, /aʊ/ and /u/ have slightly fronted starting positions, and the Mary–marry–merry merger and horse–hoarse merger are fully complete. Western New England English exhibits the entire continuum of possibilities regarding the cot–caught merger: a full merger is heard in its northern reaches (namely, Vermont), a full distinction at its southern reaches (namely, coastal Connecticut), and a transitional area in the middle. Western New England English is closely related to and possibly influential on, but more conservative (i.e. preserving more historical features) than, the Inland North dialect which prevails farther west along the Great Lakes, and which has altered away from Western New England English due to an entirely new chain shift of the vowels since the 20th century. Some Western New England English speakers do have some of this shift's features, though it is not yet fully understood if and how New England directly influenced the Inland North dialect region.

== See also ==
- Boston accent
- Maine accent
- New England French
- North American English regional phonology § New England
- Regional accents of English speakers
- Regional vocabularies of American English

== General and cited references ==
- Boberg, Charles (2010). The English Language in Canada: Status, History and Comparative Analysis. Cambridge University Press. p. 156. ISBN 9781139491440.
- Boberg, Charles (Spring 2001). "The Phonological Status of Western New England". American Speech. 76 (1): 3–29. doi:10.1215/00031283-76-1-3. S2CID 143486914.
- Fitzpatrick, Jim (2006). "Beantown Babble (Boston, MA)". In W. Wolfram; B. Ward (eds.). American Voices: How Dialects Differ from Coast to Coast. Wiley-Blackwell. pp. 63–70. ISBN 978-1-4051-2109-5.
- Labov, William; Ash, Sharon; Boberg, Charles (2006). The Atlas of North American English. Berlin: Mouton-de Gruyter. ISBN 978-3-11-016746-7.
- Nagy, Naomi; Roberts, Julie (2004). "New England phonology". In Burridge, Kate; Kortmann, Bernd; Mesthrie, Rajend; Schneider, Edgar W.; Upton, Clive (eds.). A handbook of varieties of English. Volume 1: Phonology. Berlin, FRG: Mouton de Gruyter. pp. 270–281.
- Stanford, James (2019). New England English: Large-Scale Acoustic Sociophonetics and Dialectology. New York: Oxford University Press. ISBN 9780190625658. OCLC 1100425163.
- Wells, John Christopher (1982). Accents of English. Cambridge [Cambridgeshire]: Cambridge University Press. ISBN 978-0-521-22919-7. OCLC 7578097.
- Wolfram, Walt; Schilling-Estes, S. (1998). American English: Dialects and Variation. Wiley-Blackwell. pp. 126–150. ISBN 978-0-631-20487-9.
- Flemming, E.; Johnson, S. (2007). "Rosa's roses: reduced vowels in American English". The Journal of the Acoustical Society of America. 37 (1): 83–96. doi:10.1121/1.4783597.
- Kim, Chaeyoon; Reddy, Sravana; Stanford, James N.; Wyschogrod, Ezra; Grieve, Jack (May 1, 2019). "Bring on the Crowd! Using Online Audio Crowd-Sourcing for Large-Scale New England Dialectology and Acoustic Sociophonetics". American Speech. 94 (2). Duke University Press: 151–194. doi:10.1215/00031283-7251252. ISSN 0003-1283.
- Hirshberg, Jeffrey (1981). "Regional Morphology in American English: Evidence from Dare". American Speech. 56 (1): 33–52. doi:10.2307/454477. JSTOR 454477.
- Reeves, Larkin (August 6, 2009). Patterns of Vowel Production in Speakers of American English from the State of Utah (MS thesis). Brigham Young University. hdl:1877/etd3133.
- Jones, Jennifer G. (October 11, 2021). "Do Utahns Talk Funny?". Y Magazine. Brigham Young University.
- McCarthy, Corrine (March 21, 2010). "The Northern Cities Shift in Real Time: Evidence from Chicago Selected papers from NWAV 37". rUniversity of Pennsylvania Working Papers in Linguistics. p. 12. Archived from the original on July 9, 2010.
- McCarthy, Natalie (2004). "The Northern Cities Shift and Local Identity in a Suburban Cleveland Group" (PDF). p. 7.
- Szelog, Mike (2012). "Ayuh, the Northern New England Accent in a Nutshell". The Heart of New England.
- "What do you call the long sandwich that contains cold cuts, lettuce, and so on?". The Harvard Dialect Survey. Cambridge, Massachusetts: Harvard University Linguistics Department.
