= Cot–caught merger =

Sound change in some English dialects

Examples of a merged and an unmerged speaker of American English
Non-merged speaker
[kʰäʔ] for cot and [kʰɔʔ] for caught

Merged speaker
[kʰɑt] for cot and caught alike

The cot–caught merger, also known as the LOT–THOUGHT merger or low back merger, is a phonological phenomenon present in some dialects of English where speakers do not distinguish the vowel phonemes in words like cot versus caught. Cot and caught, along with bot and bought, pond and pawned, etc., are examples of minimal pairs that are lost as a result of this sound change; i.e. each of these pairs of words is pronounced the same. The phonemes involved in the cot–caught merger, the low back vowels, are typically represented in the International Phonetic Alphabet as /ɒ/ and /ɔ/ or, for American English, as /ɑ/ and /ɔ/. (Note: Using the lexical sets conceived by linguist John C. Wells, the vowel in PALM is /ɑ/, in LOT is /ɒ/, and in THOUGHT is /ɔ/. Most of the U.S. already had a merger of the PALM and LOT vowels before the advent of the cot–caught merger, which further merges THOUGHT. However, a small number of U.S. accents, namely in northeastern New England (including Boston accents) merge LOT and THOUGHT while keeping PALM distinct.) The merger is typical of most Indian, Canadian, and Scottish English dialects as well as some Irish and U.S. English dialects.

An additional vowel merger, the father–bother merger, which spread through North America in the eighteenth and nineteenth centuries, has resulted today in a three-way merger in which most Canadian and many U.S. accents have no vowel difference in words like PALM /ɑ/, LOT /ɒ/, and THOUGHT /ɔ/.

However, /ɔ/ before /r/ (as in NORTH) does not undergo the merger, participating in a separate phenomenon in most English dialects worldwide: the NORTH–FORCE merger, wherein for instance words like cord and cored are pronounced the same, while card is pronounced distinctly. (Note: Thus, the vowel of /ɔr/ can be phonemicized as the GOAT vowel, and so this particular sequence is sometimes alternatively transcribed as /or/ or /oʊr/.)

== Overview ==
IPA: Vowels

	Front	Central	Back
Close	i y	ɨ ʉ	ɯ u
Near-close	ɪ ʏ		ʊ
Close-mid	e ø	ɘ ɵ	ɤ o
Mid	e̞ ø̞	ə	ɤ̞ o̞
Open-mid	ɛ œ	ɜ ɞ	ʌ ɔ
Near-open	æ	ɐ
Open	a ɶ	ä	ɑ ɒ

- IPA help
- audio
- full chart
- template

Legend: unrounded • rounded

The shift causes the vowel sound in words like cot, nod and stock and the vowel sound in words like caught, gnawed and stalk to merge into a single phoneme; therefore the pairs cot and caught, stock and stalk, nod and gnawed become perfect homophones, and shock and talk, for example, become perfect rhymes. The cot–caught merger is completed in the following dialects:

- Some English of the British Isles, outside of England:
  - Most Scottish English, towards [ɔ]
  - Broad and traditional Irish English, towards [a]
  - Some northern Ulster English including in conservative mid Ulster English towards [ä] and in Ulster Scots English towards [ɔ]
- Much of the English of North America:
  - Certain varieties of American English, including:
    - Pittsburgh English, towards [ɒ~ɔ] (with the father–bother merger)
    - Much of New England English towards [ɑ~ɒ] (in Boston, particularly towards [ɒ]), and Northern New England generally, but traditionally not Southern New England
    - Western American English (with the father–bother merger) towards [ɑ]
    - Upper Midwestern English, Chicano English, and some Western New England English (with the father–bother merger) towards [ä]
  - Nearly all Canadian English, including:
    - Standard Canadian English towards [ɒ] (with the father–bother merger)
    - Maritimer and Newfoundland English, towards [ɑ~ä] (with the father–bother merger)
- Much Indian English towards [ɔ] or [ɒ]
- Some Singaporean English

Examples of homophonous pairs
/ɑ/ or /ɒ/ (written a, o, ol)	/ɔ/ (written au, aw, al, ough)	IPA (using ⟨ɒ⟩ for the merged vowel)
bobble	bauble	ˈbɒbəl
body	bawdy	ˈbɒdi
bot	bought	ˈbɒt
box	balks	ˈbɒks
chock	chalk	ˈtʃɒk
clod	clawed	ˈklɒd
cock	caulk	ˈkɒk
cod	cawed	ˈkɒd
collar	caller	ˈkɒlə(r)
cot	caught	ˈkɒt
don	dawn	ˈdɒn
fond	fawned	ˈfɒnd
hock	hawk	ˈhɒk
holler	hauler	ˈhɒlə(r)
hottie	haughty	ˈhɒti
knot	nought	ˈnɒt
knotty	naughty	ˈnɒti
nod	gnawed	ˈnɒd
not	nought	ˈnɒt
odd	awed	ˈɒd
pod	pawed	ˈpɒd
pond	pawned	ˈpɒnd
rot	wrought	ˈrɒt
sod	sawed	ˈsɒd
sot	sought	ˈsɒt
stock	stalk	ˈstɒk
tot	taught	ˈtɒt
wok	walk	ˈwɒk

== North America ==
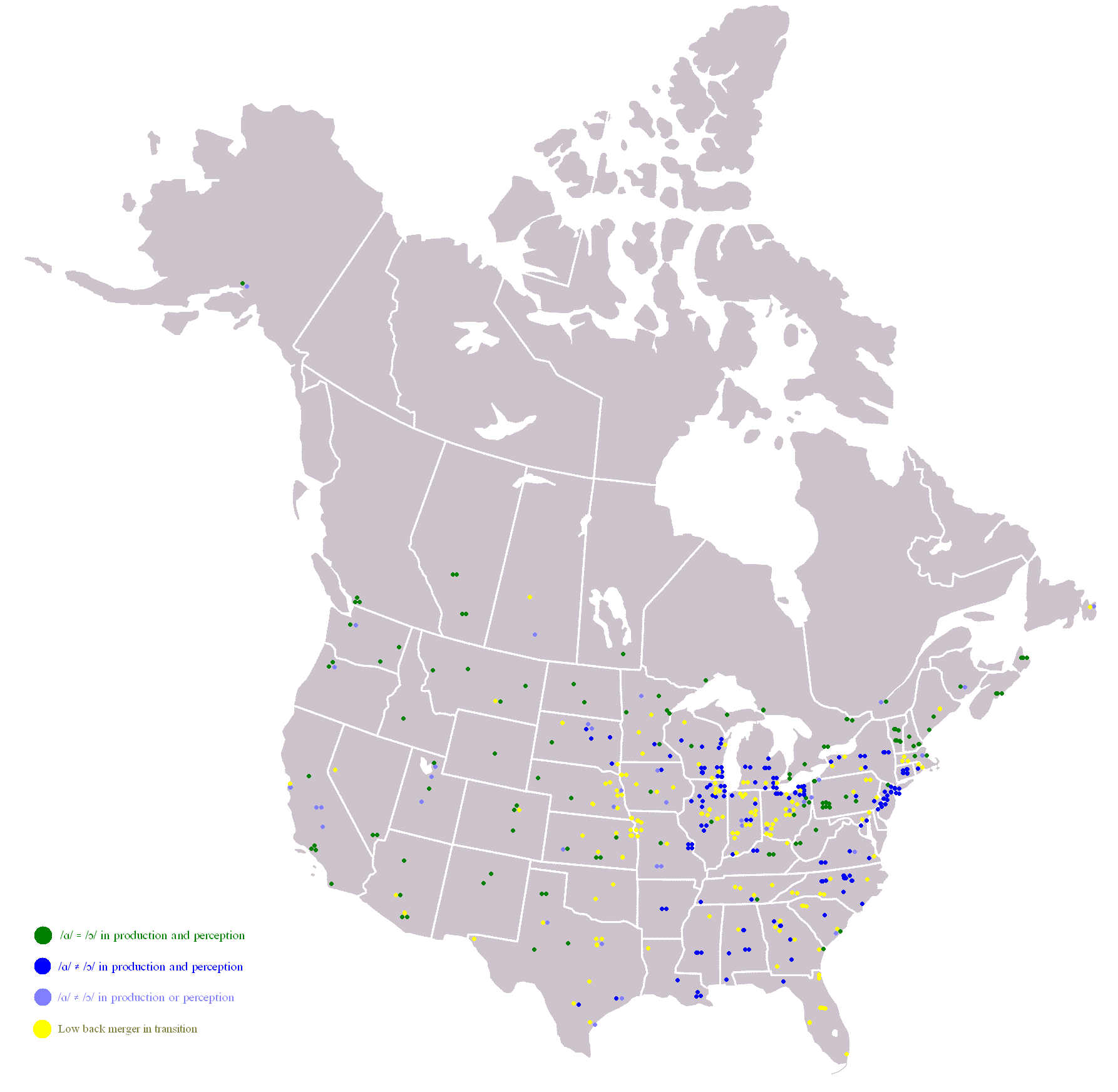
On this map of English-speaking North America, based on data from the 2006 Atlas of North American English, the green dots represent speakers who have completely merged the vowels of cot and caught. The dark blue dots represent speakers who have completely resisted the merger. The medium blue dots represent speakers with a partial merger (either production or perception but not both), and the yellow dots represent speakers with the merger in transition.

The presence of the merger and its absence are both found in many different regions of the North American continent, where it has been studied in greatest depth, and in both urban and rural environments. The symbols traditionally used to transcribe the vowels in the words cot and caught as spoken in American English are ⟨ɑ⟩ and ⟨ɔ⟩, respectively, although their precise phonetic values may vary, as does the phonetic value of the merged vowel in the regions where the merger occurs.

Even without taking into account the mobility of the American population, the distribution of the merger is still complex; there are pockets of speakers with the merger in areas that lack it, and vice versa. There are areas where the merger has only partially occurred, or is in a state of transition. For example, based on research directed by William Labov (using telephone surveys) in the 1990s, younger speakers in Kansas, Nebraska, and the Dakotas exhibited the merger while speakers older than 40 typically did not. The 2003 Harvard Dialect Survey, in which subjects did not necessarily grow up in the place they identified as the source of their dialect features, indicates that there are speakers of both merging and contrast-preserving accents throughout the country, though the basic isoglosses are almost identical to those revealed by Labov's 1996 telephone survey. Both surveys indicate that, as of the 1990s, approximately 60% of American English speakers preserved the contrast, while approximately 40% merged the phonemes. Further complicating matters are speakers who merge the phonemes in some contexts but not others, or merge them when the words are spoken unstressed or casually but not when they are stressed.

Speakers with the merger in northeastern New England still maintain a phonemic distinction between a fronted and unrounded /ɑ/ (phonetically [ä]) and a back and usually rounded /ɔ/ (phonetically [ɒ]), because in northeastern New England (unlike in Canada and the Western United States), the cot–caught merger occurred without the father–bother merger. Thus, although northeastern New Englanders pronounce both cot and caught as [kɒt], they pronounce cart as [kät].

Labov et al. also reveal that, for about 15% of respondents, a specific /ɑ/–/ɔ/ merger before /n/ but not before /t/ (or other consonants) is in effect, so that Don and dawn are homophonous, but cot and caught are not. In this case, a distinct vowel shift (which overlaps with the cot–caught merger for all speakers who have indeed completed the cot–caught merger) is taking place, identified as the Don–dawn merger.

=== Resistance ===
According to Labov, Ash, and Boberg, the merger in North America is most strongly resisted in three regions:

- The "Inland North", encompassing the eastern and central Great Lakes region (on the U.S. side of the border)
- The "Northeast Corridor" along the Atlantic coast, ranging from Baltimore to Philadelphia to New York City to Providence. However, the merger is common in Boston and further northern New England.
- The "South", somewhat excluding Texas and Florida.

In the three American regions above, sociolinguists have studied three phonetic shifts that can explain their resistance to the merger. The first is the fronting of /ɑ/ found in the Inland North, in which the LOT vowel /ɑ/ is advanced as far as the cardinal [a] (the open front unrounded vowel), thus allowing the THOUGHT vowel /ɔ/ to lower into the phonetic environment of [ɑ] without any merger taking place. The second situation is the raising of the THOUGHT vowel /ɔ/ found in Providence, New York City, Philadelphia, and Baltimore, in which the vowel is raised and diphthongized to [ɔə⁓oə], or, less commonly, [ʊə], thus keeping that vowel notably distinct from the LOT vowel /ɑ/. The third situation occurs in the South, in which vowel breaking results in /ɔ/ being pronounced as upgliding [ɒʊ], keeping it distinct from /ɑ/. None of these three phonetic shifts, however, is certain to preserve the contrast for all speakers in these regions. Some speakers in all three regions, particularly younger ones, are beginning to exhibit the merger despite the fact that each region's phonetics should theoretically block it.

African-American Vernacular English accents have traditionally resisted the cot–caught merger, with lot pronounced [ɑ̈] and thought traditionally pronounced [ɒɔ], though now often [ɒ~ɔə]. Early-2000s research has shown that this resistance may continue to be reinforced by the fronting of lot, linked through a chain shift of vowels to the raising of the trap, dress, and perhaps kit vowels. This chain shift is called the "African American Shift". However, there is still evidence of AAVE speakers picking up the cot–caught merger in Pittsburgh, Pennsylvania, in Charleston, South Carolina, in Florida and Georgia, and in parts of California.

=== Origin ===
In North America, the first evidence of the merger (or its initial conditions) comes from western Pennsylvania as far back as the data shows. From there, it entered Upper Canada (what is now Ontario). In the mid-19th century, the merger also independently began in eastern New England, possibly influencing the Canadian Maritimes, though the merger is in evidence as early as the 1830s in both regions of Canada: Ontario and the Maritimes. Fifty years later, the merger "was already more established in Canada" than in its two U.S. places of origin. In Canadian English, further westward spread was completed more quickly than in English of the United States.

Two traditional theories of the merger's origins have been longstanding in linguistics: one group of scholars argues for an independent North American development, while others argue for contact-induced language change via Scots-Irish or Scottish immigrants to North America. In fact, both theories may be true but for different regions. The merger's appearance in western Pennsylvania is better explained as an effect of Scots-Irish settlement, but in eastern New England, and perhaps the American West, as an internal structural development. Canadian linguist Charles Boberg considers the issue unresolved. A third theory has been used to explain the merger's appearance specifically in northeastern Pennsylvania: an influx of Polish- and other Slavic-language speakers whose learner English failed to maintain the distinction.

== Scotland ==
Outside North America, another dialect featuring the merger is Scottish English, where the merged vowel has a quality around [ɔ̞]. In Standard Scottish English, both the LOT and THOUGHT lexical sets are realized with the vowel /ɔ/, producing homophones such as "knotty" and "naughty", "don" and "dawn", and "not" and "nought". Some speakers, however, do not apply the merger categorically: the opposition between the two lexical sets is less systematic than in RP, and /ɔ/ may appear in certain LOT words such as "yacht", "wash", "watch", and "squad" without the full merger being realized. Like in New England English, the "cot"–"caught" merger in Scottish English occurred without the "father"–"bother" merger, meaning speakers retain a distinct /ɑ/ vowel for the PALM lexical set. Therefore, speakers still retain the distinction between /a/ in PALM and /ɔ/ in LOT–THOUGHT.

== India ==
The merger is also quite prevalent in Indian English, possibly due to contact with Scottish English. In particular, the LOT vowel may be lengthened to merge with the THOUGHT vowel /ɒː/. However, there are also speakers who maintain a distinction in length and/or quality. Like in Scottish English, this vowel is not usually merged with PALM /ɑː/ in General Indian English.

== See also ==
- Low-back-merger shift
- Phonological history of English open back vowels

== Bibliography ==
- Baranowski, Maciej (2013), "Ethnicity and Sound Change: African American English in Charleston, SC", University of Pennsylvania Working Papers in Linguistics, 19 (2): 1–10, S2CID 2034660
- Eberhardt, Maeve (2008), "The Low-Back Merger in the Steel City: African American English in Pittsburgh", American Speech, 83 (3): 284–311, doi:10.1215/00031283-2008-021
- Gordon, Matthew J. (2005), "The Midwest Accent", American Varieties, PBS
- Jones, Taylor (1 January 2020). Variation in African American English: The Great Migration and Regional Differentiation (PDF) (Thesis). ProQuest 2423437304.
- Labov, William; Ash, Sharon; Boberg, Charles (2006). The Atlas of North American English: Phonetics, Phonology, and Sound Change: a Multimedia Reference Tool. Berlin; New York: Walter de Gruyter. ISBN 3-11-016746-8.
- Wells, John C. (1982), Accents of English, Vol. 2: The British Isles (pp. i–xx, 279–466), Cambridge University Press, doi:10.1017/CBO9780511611759, ISBN 0-52128540-2
