= Phonological history of English open back vowels =

The phonology of the open back vowels of the English language has undergone changes both overall and with regional variations, through Old and Middle English to the present. The sounds heard in modern English were significantly influenced by the Great Vowel Shift, as well as more recent developments in some dialects such as the cot–caught merger.

== Overview ==
=== Old and Middle English ===
In the Old English vowel system, the vowels in the open back area were unrounded: /ɑ/, /ɑː/. There were also rounded back vowels of mid-height: /o/, /oː/. The corresponding spellings were ⟨a⟩ and ⟨o⟩, with the length distinctions not normally marked; in modern editions of Old English texts, the long vowels are often written ⟨ā⟩, ⟨ō⟩.

As the Old English (OE) system developed into that of Middle English (ME), the OE short vowel /ɑ/ merged with the fronted /æ/ to become a more central ME /a/. Meanwhile, the OE long vowel /ɑː/ was rounded and raised to ME /ɔː/. OE short /o/ remained relatively unchanged, becoming a short ME vowel regarded as /o/ or /ɔ/, while OE long /oː/ became ME /oː/ (a higher vowel than /ɔː/). Alternative developments were also possible; see English historical vowel correspondences for details.

Later, ME open syllable lengthening caused the short vowel /o/ to be normally changed to /ɔː/ in open syllables. Remaining instances of the short vowel /o/ also tended to become lower. Hence in Late Middle English (around 1400) the following open back vowels were present, distinguished by length:

- /ɔ/, spelt ⟨o⟩, as in dog, god
- /ɔː/, often spelt ⟨oa⟩, or ⟨o⟩ before consonant+vowel or certain consonant pairs, as in boat, whole, old

=== 16th-century changes ===
By 1600, the following changes had occurred:

- The long vowel /ɔː/ of boat had been raised to /oː/ as a result of the Great Vowel Shift.
- The diphthong /aw/ found in words such as cause, law, all, salt, psalm, half, change, chamber, dance had become an open back monophthong /ɔː/ or /ɑː/.
- At this time, the short /ɔ/ in dog was lowered to /ɒ/

There were thus two open back monophthongs:

- /ɒ/ as in lot
- /ɔː/ or /ɑː/ as in cause

and one open back diphthong:

- /ɔw/ as in low

=== 17th-century changes ===
By 1700, the following further developments had taken place:

- The diphthong /ɔw/ of soul was raised to /ow/, and then monophthongized to /oː/, merging with boat (see toe–tow merger). Before /r/, this vowel further merged with /ɔː/ due to the horse–hoarse merger except in some varieties, as currently seen in Irish English, Scottish English and African American Vernacular English.
- Short /wa/ was retracted and rounded to /wɒ/. The shift was suppressed before a velar consonant, as in quack, twang, wag, wax, and also was suppressed by analogy in swam (the ("strong-verb") past tense of swim). The change of /wa/ to /wɒ/ did not occur in Mid-Ulster English.
- /ɒ/ had begun to partake in lengthening and raising before a nonprevocalic voiceless fricative or /r/. That resulted in words like broth, cost and off having /ɒː/ instead of /ɒ/, and was the start of the LOT–CLOTH split (see further below).
- In words such as change and chamber, the pronunciation /ɔː/ was gradually replaced in the standard language by a variant with /eː/, derived from Middle English /aː/. That explains the contemporary pronunciation of these words with /eɪ/.
- However, when /ɔː/ preceded /f/, as in laugh and half, /ɔː/ was shifted to /æ/ instead, derived from Middle English /a/.
- An unrounded back vowel /ɑː/ developed, found in certain classes of words that had previously had /a/, like start, father and palm.

That left the standard form of the language with four open back vowels:

- /ɒ/ in lot and want.
- /ɒː/ in cloth and cost.
- /ɑː/ in start, father and palm.
- /ɔː/ in tor, cause, and corn.

=== Later changes ===
From the 18th century on, the following changes have occurred:

- The three-way distinction between /ɒ/, /ɒː/, and /ɔː/ was simplified in one of two ways:
  - In General American and old-fashioned RP, /ɒː/ was raised to /ɔː/, merging with the vowel in THOUGHT (the cloth-thought merger).
  - In many accents of England, the lengthening of the CLOTH set was undone, restoring the short pronunciation /ɒ/. This became standard RP by the mid-20th century.
- In General American, the lot vowel has become unrounded and merged into /ɑ/ (the father–bother merger).

This leaves RP with three back vowels:

- /ɒ/ in lot, want, cloth, and cost.
- /ɔː/ in tor, cause, and corn.
- /ɑː/ in start, father, and palm.

and General American with two:

- /ɑ/ in lot, want, start, father, and palm.
- /ɔ/ in tor, cause, corn, cloth and cost.

== Variation in present-day English ==
=== Unrounded LOT ===
In a few varieties of English, the vowel in lot is unrounded, pronounced toward [ɑ]. This is found in the following dialects:

- Most of Irish English
- Much of the Caribbean
- Norwich
- The West Country and the West Midlands of England
- Most of North American English
  - Excluding northeastern New England English and Western Pennsylvania English, where it is typically raised toward /ɔ/, merging with the vowel in thought.

There's also evidence for it in South East England as early as the late 16th century and as late as the 19th century.

Linguists disagree as to whether the unrounding of the lot vowel occurred independently in North America (probably occurring around the end of the 17th century) or was imported from certain types of speech current in Britain at that time.

In such accents outside of North America, lot typically is pronounced as [lɑt], therefore being kept distinct from the vowel in palm, pronounced [pɑːm] or [paːm]. However, the major exception to this is North American English, where the vowel is lengthened to merge with the vowel in palm, as described below. This merger is called the LOT–PALM merger or more commonly the father–bother merger. (See further below.)

=== Father–bother merger ===
The father–bother merger is a phonemic merger of the lexical sets LOT and PALM. It represents unrounded lot, as detailed above, taken a step further. On top of being unrounded, the length distinction between the vowel in lot and bother and the vowel in palm and father is lost, so that the two groups merge. This causes father and bother to become rhymes.

This occurs in the great majority of North American accents; of the North American dialects that have unrounded lot, the only notable exception to the merger is New York City English, where the opposition with the [ɑ]-type vowel is somewhat tenuous.

Examples of possible homophones resulting from the merger include Khan and con (/kɑn/) as well as Saab and sob (/sɑb/).

While the accents in northeastern New England, such as the Boston accent, also remain unmerged among older speakers, lot remains rounded and merges instead with cloth and thought.

Homophonous pairs
| /ɑ:/ | /ɒ/ or /ɔ/ (Note: only homophonous with the cot-caught merger) | IPA (using ⟨ɑ⟩ for the merged vowel) | Notes |
|---|---|---|---|
| ah | awe | ˈɑ | with the cot-caught merger |
| balm | bomb | ˈbɑm | when the <l> in balm is unsounded |
| Bali | bolly | ˈbɑli | |
| baht | bot | ˈbɑt | |
| baht | bought | ˈbɑt | with the cot-caught merger |
| Dalí | dolly | ˈdɑli | |
| Hajj | Hodge | ˈhɑdʒ | |
| Khan | con | ˈkɑn | |
| la | law | ˈlɑ | with the cot-caught merger |
| lager | logger | ˈlɑgər | without the lot-cloth split and/or with the cot-caught merger |
| Mali | Molly | ˈmɑli | |
| malm | mom | ˈmɑm | |
| pa | paw | ˈpɑ | with the cot-caught merger |
| palm | pom | ˈpɑm | when the <l> in palm is unsounded |
| Prague | prog | ˈprɑg | |
| Raab | rob | ˈrɑb | |
| Saab | sob | ˈsɑb | |
| Shah | Shaw | ˈʃɑ | with the cot-caught merger |
| Siân | Sean, Shaun, Shawn | ˈʃɑn | with the cot-caught merger |
| Siân | shone | ˈʃɑn | |
| Stalin | stalling | ˈstɑlɪn | with the cot-caught merger and G-dropping. |

=== LOT–CLOTH split ===
The LOT–CLOTH split is the result of a late 17th-century sound change that lengthened /ɒ/ to [ɒː] before voiceless fricatives, and also before /n/ in the words gone and sometimes on. It was ultimately raised and merged with /ɔː/ of words like thought, although in some accents that vowel is actually open [ɒː]. This means that CLOTH is not a separate vowel; rather, it means "either LOT or THOUGHT, depending on the accent". The sound change is most consistent in the last syllable of a word, and much less so elsewhere (see below). Some words that entered the language later, especially when used more in writing than speech, are exempt from the lengthening, e.g. Goth with the short vowel. Similar changes took place in words with ⟨a⟩; see trap–bath split and /æ/-tensing.

The cot–caught merger, discussed below, has removed the distinction in some dialects.

As a result of the lengthening and raising, in the above-mentioned accents cross rhymes with sauce, and soft and cloth also have the vowel /ɔː/. Accents affected by this change include American English accents that lack the cot-caught merger and formerly RP, although with the exception of water /wɔːtə(r)/, today words of this group almost always have short /ɒ/ in RP.

The lengthening and raising generally happened before the fricatives /f/, /θ/, and /s/, and in the word water for an unknown reason (compare the broadening of a in father). In American English, the raising was extended to the environment before velars /ŋ/ and /ɡ/, and sometimes before /k/ as well, giving pronunciations like /lɔŋ/ for long, /dɔɡ/ for dog and /ˈtʃɔklət/ for chocolate.

In the varieties of American English that have the lot–cloth split, the lot vowel is usually symbolized as /ɑ/, often called the "short o" for historical reasons, as the corresponding RP vowel /ɒ/ is still short (and it contrasts with /ɑː/ as in father and start). The thought vowel is usually transcribed as /ɔ/ and it is often called the "open o". Its actual phonetic realization may be open [ɒ], whereas the lot vowel may be realized as central [ä]. Some words vary as to which vowel they have. For example, words that end in -og like frog, hog, fog, log, bog etc. have /ɑ/ in some accents and /ɔ/ in others.

There are also significant complexities in the pronunciation of written o occurring before one of the triggering phonemes /f θ s ŋ ɡ/ in a non-final syllable. In other cases, however, the use of the open o as opposed to the short o is largely predictable. Just like with /æ/-tensing and the trap–bath split, there seems to be an open-syllable constraint. Namely, the change did not affect words with /ɑ/ in open syllables unless they were closely derived from words with /ɑ/ in closed syllables. Hence /ɔ/ occurs in crossing, crosser, crosses because it occurs in cross. In contrast, possible, jostle, impostor, profit, Gothic, and boggle all have /ɑ/. However, there are still exceptions in words like Boston and foster (Note: It was pronounced with /ɔ/ in Middle English so it was not affected by this split.). A further list of words is mentioned in the table below:

Vowels with lot–cloth splits
| Set | THOUGHT (/ɔ/) | LOT (/ɑ~ɒ/) | Variable |
|---|---|---|---|
| /-f/ | cough, off, often, soften, trough, etc. | philosophical, profit | coffee, coffer, coffin, offense, offer, office, officer, waffle |
| /-ft/ | croft, soft, etc. | waft | loft |
| /-g/ | —N/a | boggle, cog, flog | blog, boondoggle, dog, fog, frog, hog, log, soggy, tog, etc. |
| /-k/ | bock | all other words in this set | chocolate, clock, mock, shock |
| /-n/ | gone | all other words in this set | beyond, on, upon, want (Note: Also pronounced /wʌnt/ by some American speakers), wont |
| /-ŋ/ | —N/a | Congo, bongo, congress, conquer | conch, donkey, long, longest, song, strong, thong, wrong, etc. |
| /-s/ | across, cross, fosse, floss, loss, toss, etc. | apostle, fossil, gossip, jostle, oscillate, philosophy, posse, possible, possum, rhinoceros, velocity | boss, gloss, glossary, joss, moss |
| /-st/ | cost, frost, lost, etc. | apostrophe, (a/pro)gnostic, hostage, hostel, hostile, impostor, nostril, ossify, ostensible, posterity, prosecute, roster | accost, Boston, foster, Gloucester, nostalgia, ostentatious, ostrich, ostracism, rostrum |
| /-ʃ/ | —N/a | all other words in this set | quash, squash, swash, wash, washergosh, Washington |
| /-θ/ | broth, cloth, froth etc. | Goth, Gothic | moth, sloth, swath, troth, wrath |

Some words may vary depending on the speaker like (coffee, offer, donkey, soggy, boondoggle, etc. with either /ɑ/ or /ɔ/). Meanwhile, other words vary by region. For example, the word on, which in Northern American English dialects without the cot-caught merger is pronounced /ɑn/, rhyming with don, but in Midland and Southern American English without the merger is pronounced /ɔn/, rhyming with dawn. The isogloss for this difference, termed the ON line, lies between New York City and Philadelphia on the East Coast and runs West as far as speakers without the merger can be found. Pronunciation of the word want as /wɔnt/ is also strongly associated with the South.

=== Cot–caught merger ===
The cot–caught merger (also known as the low back merger or the LOT–THOUGHT merger) is a phonemic merger occurring in many accents of English, where the vowel sound in words like cot, nod, and stock (the LOT vowel), has merged with that of caught, gnawed, and stalk (the THOUGHT vowel). For example, with the merger, cot and caught become perfect homophones.

Lexical changes in cot–caught merger dialects of North America
| Lexical set | Example words | Change | GenAm phonemes | Minimal pairs | IPA | Change | Cot–caught merger dialects |
|---|---|---|---|---|---|---|---|
| PALM | ah, father, spa | Father–bother merger | /ɑ/ | cot, collar, stock, wok, chock, Don | /kɑt/, /ˈkɑlər/, /stɑk/, /wɑk/, /tʃɑk/, /dɑn/ | Cot–caught merger | /kɑt/, /ˈkɑlər/, /stɑk/, /wɑk/, /tʃɑk/, /dɑn/ |
| LOT | bother, lot, wasp | Father–bother merger | /ɑ/ | cot, collar, stock, wok, chock, Don | /kɑt/, /ˈkɑlər/, /stɑk/, /wɑk/, /tʃɑk/, /dɑn/ | Cot–caught merger | /kɑt/, /ˈkɑlər/, /stɑk/, /wɑk/, /tʃɑk/, /dɑn/ |
| CLOTH | boss, cloth, dog, off | Cloth-thought merger | /ɔ/ | caught, caller, stalk, walk, chalk, dawn | /kɔt/, /ˈkɔlər/, /stɔk/, /wɔk/, /tʃɔk/, /dɔn/ | Cot–caught merger | /kɑt/, /ˈkɑlər/, /stɑk/, /wɑk/, /tʃɑk/, /dɑn/ |
| THOUGHT | all, thought, flaunt | Cloth-thought merger | /ɔ/ | caught, caller, stalk, walk, chalk, dawn | /kɔt/, /ˈkɔlər/, /stɔk/, /wɔk/, /tʃɔk/, /dɔn/ | Cot–caught merger | /kɑt/, /ˈkɑlər/, /stɑk/, /wɑk/, /tʃɑk/, /dɑn/ |

=== GOAT–THOUGHT merger ===
The GOAT–THOUGHT merger is a merger of the English vowels of GOAT /oʊ/ and THOUGHT /ɔː/ that has been reported in Geordie since the late 20th century, with a quality around [oː]. The merger is more common among younger female speakers.

The merger also exists among older speakers in Bradford English with a quality around [ɔː], but younger speakers are more likely to resist the merger by fronting the GOAT vowel.

Homophonous pairs
| /ɔo:/ | /oʊ/ | IPA (using ⟨oː⟩ for the merged vowel) | Notes |
|---|---|---|---|
| aboard | abode | əˈboːd | non-rhotic with the horse-hoarse merger |
| alder | older | ˈoːdə | |
| augur | ogre | ˈoːgə | |
| auk | oak | ˈoːk | |
| awe | O | ˈoː | |
| awe | oh | ˈoː | |
| awe | owe | ˈoː | |
| awed | ode | ˈoːd | |
| awning | owning | ˈoːnɪŋ | |
| bald | bold | ˈboːld | |
| bald | bowled | ˈboːld | |
| ball | bowl | ˈboːl | |
| boar | beau | ˈboː | non-rhotic with the horse-hoarse merger |
| bore | beau | ˈboː | non-rhotic with the horse-hoarse merger |
| boar | bow | ˈboː | non-rhotic with the horse-hoarse merger |
| bore | bow | ˈboː | non-rhotic with the horse-hoarse merger |
| board | bode | ˈboːd | non-rhotic with the horse-hoarse merger |
| bored | bode | ˈboːd | non-rhotic with the horse-hoarse merger |
| born | bone | ˈboːn | non-rhotic |
| caulk | coke | ˈkoːk | |
| call | coal | ˈkoːl | |
| caller | cola | ˈkoːlə | non-rhotic |
| caught | coat | ˈkoːt | |
| cawed | code | ˈkoːd | |
| chalk | choke | ˈtʃoːk | |
| chord | code | ˈkod | non-rhotic |
| clause | close | ˈkloːz | |
| claws | close | ˈkloːz | |
| cord | code | ˈkoːd | non-rhotic |
| cork | coke | ˈkoːk | non-rhotic |
| corks | coax | ˈkoːks | non-rhotic |
| court | coat | ˈkoːt | non-rhotic with the horse-hoarse merger |
| daunt | don't | ˈdoːnt | |
| door | doe | ˈdoː | non-rhotic with the horse-hoarse merger |
| drawl | droll | ˈdroːl | |
| drawn | drone | ˈdroːn | |
| explored | explode | ˈɪksploːd | non-rhotic with the horse-hoarse merger |
| fall | foal | ˈfoːl | |
| fawn | phone | ˈfoːn | |
| flaw | flow | ˈfloː | |
| floor | flow | ˈfloː | non-rhotic with the horse-hoarse merger |
| for | foe | ˈfoː | non-rhotic |
| fore | foe | ˈfoː | non-rhotic with the horse-hoarse merger |
| fork | folk | ˈfoːk | non-rhotic |
| form | foam | ˈfoːm | non-rhotic |
| four | foe | ˈfoː | non-rhotic with the horse-hoarse merger |
| gall | goal | ˈgoːl | |
| galled | gold | ˈgoːld | |
| Gaul | goal | ˈgoːl | |
| gnaw | know | ˈnoː | |
| gnaw | no | ˈnoː | |
| hall | hole | ˈhoːl | |
| hall | whole | ˈhoːl | |
| haul | hole | ˈhoːl | |
| haul | whole | ˈhoːl | |
| hauled | hold | ˈhoːld | |
| haw | ho | ˈhoː | |
| haw | hoe | ˈhoː | |
| hawks | hoax | ˈhoːks | |
| hoard | hoed | ˈhoːd | non-rhotic with the horse-hoarse merger |
| horn | hone | ˈhoːn | non-rhotic |
| jaw | Joe | ˈdʒoː | |
| laud | lord | ˈloː | |
| law | low | ˈloː | |
| lawn | loan | ˈloːn | |
| lawn | lone | ˈloːn | |
| lord | load | ˈloːd | non-rhotic |
| lore | low | ˈloː | non-rhotic with the horse-hoarse merger |
| mall | mole | ˈmoːl | |
| maul | mole | ˈmoːl | |
| mauled | mould | ˈmoːld | |
| maw | mow | ˈmoː | |
| more | mow | ˈmoː | non-rhotic with the horse-hoarse merger |
| mortar | motor | ˈmoːtə | non-rhotic |
| nor | know | ˈnoː | non-rhotic |
| nor | no | ˈnoː | non-rhotic |
| norm | gnome | ˈnoːm | non-rhotic |
| nought | note | ˈnoːt | |
| oar | O | ˈoː | non-rhotic with the horse-hoarse merger |
| oar | oh | ˈoː | non-rhotic with the horse-hoarse merger |
| oar | owe | ˈoː | non-rhotic with the horse-hoarse merger |
| or | O | ˈoː | non-rhotic |
| or | oh | ˈoː | non-rhotic |
| or | owe | ˈoː | non-rhotic |
| order | odour | ˈoːdə | non-rhotic |
| ore | O | ˈoː | non-rhotic with the horse-hoarse merger |
| ore | oh | ˈoː | non-rhotic with the horse-hoarse merger |
| ore | owe | ˈoː | non-rhotic with the horse-hoarse merger |
| overawed | overrode | oːvəˈroːd | |
| pall | pole | ˈpoːl | |
| Paul | pole | ˈpoːl | |
| pause | pose | ˈpoːz | |
| paws | pose | ˈpoːz | |
| pores | pose | ˈpoːz | non-rhotic with the horse-hoarse merger |
| pours | pose | ˈpoːz | non-rhotic with the horse-hoarse merger |
| porch | poach | ˈpoːtʃ | non-rhotic with the horse-hoarse merger |
| pork | poke | ˈpoːk | non-rhotic with the horse-hoarse merger |
| portion | potion | ˈpoː | non-rhotic with the horse-hoarse merger |
| prawn | prone | ˈproːn | |
| quart | quote | ˈkwoːt | non-rhotic |
| raw | row | ˈroː | |
| roar | row | ˈroː | non-rhotic with the horse-hoarse merger |
| saw | sew | ˈsoː | |
| saw | so | ˈsoː | |
| scald | scold | ˈskoːld | |
| scrawl | scroll | ˈskroːl | |
| shawl | shoal | ˈʃoːl | |
| Shaun | shown | ˈʃoːn | |
| Shaw | show | ˈʃoː | |
| shore | show | ˈʃoː | non-rhotic with the horse-hoarse merger |
| shorn | shown | ˈʃoːn | non-rhotic with the horse-hoarse merger |
| slaw | slow | ˈsloː | |
| snore | snow | ˈsnoː | non-rhotic with the horse-hoarse merger |
| stalk | stoke | ˈstoːk | |
| stall | stole | ˈstoːl | |
| store | stow | ˈstoː | non-rhotic with the horse-hoarse merger |
| stork | stoke | ˈstoːk | non-rhotic |
| strawed | strode | ˈstroːd | |
| talk | toque | ˈtoːk | |
| taught | tote | ˈtoːt | |
| taut | tote | ˈtoːt | |
| tor | toe | ˈtoː | non-rhotic |
| tor | tow | ˈtoː | non-rhotic |
| tore | toe | ˈtoː | non-rhotic with the horse-hoarse merger |
| tore | tow | ˈtoː | non-rhotic with the horse-hoarse merger |
| torn | tone | ˈtoːn | non-rhotic with the horse-hoarse merger |
| tawny | Tony | ˈtoːni | |
| trawl | troll | ˈtroːl | |
| walk | woke | ˈwoːk | |
| walled | wold | ˈwoːld | |
| war | woe | ˈwoː | non-rhotic |
| ward | wode | ˈwoːd | non-rhotic |
| warred | wode | ˈwoːd | non-rhotic |
| yore | yo | ˈjoː | non-rhotic with the horse-hoarse merger |
| York | yolk | ˈjoːk | |
| York | yoke | ˈjoːk | |

=== London THOUGHT split ===
In some London accents of English, the vowel in words such as thought, force, and north, which merged earlier on in these varieties of English, undergoes a conditional split based on syllable structure: closed syllables have a higher vowel quality such as [oː] (possibly even [oʊ] in broad Cockney varieties), and open syllables have a lower vowel quality [ɔ̝ː] or a centering diphthong [ɔə].

Originally-open syllables with an inflectional suffix (such as bored) retain the lower vowel quality, creating minimal pairs such as bored [bɔəd] vs. board [boːd] or paws [pɔəz] vs. pause [poːz].

=== Geordie THOUGHT split ===
In broad Geordie, some THOUGHT words (roughly, those spelled with a, as in walk and talk) have [aː] (which phonetically is the long counterpart of TRAP /a/) instead of the standard [ɔː]. Those are the traditional dialect forms which are being replaced with the standard [ɔː]. [aː] is therefore not necessarily a distinct phoneme in the vowel system of Geordie, also because it occurs as an allophone of /a/ before voiced consonants.

=== Distribution of /ɑː/ ===
The distribution of the vowel transcribed with ⟨ɑː⟩ in broad IPA varies greatly among dialects. It corresponds to /æ/, /ɒ/, /ɔː/ and (when not prevocalic within the same word) /ɑːr/ and even /ɔːr/ in other dialects:

- In non-rhotic dialects spoken outside of North America, /ɑː/ corresponds mostly to /ɑːr/ in General American and so is most often spelled ⟨ar⟩. In dialects with the trap–bath split (such as Received Pronunciation, New Zealand English and South African English), it also corresponds to GA /æ/, which means that it can also be spelled ⟨a⟩ before voiceless fricatives. In those dialects, /ɒ/ and /ɔː/ are separate phonemes.
- In native words, /ɑː/ in most non-rhotic speech of North America corresponds to both /ɑːr/ in GA (RP /ɑː/) and /ɒ/ in RP, as those dialects feature the father–bother merger.
- North American English features the father–bother merger, where /ɑː/ often corresponds to /ɒ/ in RP. Only New York City English and New England English distinguish between the two, and with an unrounded LOT vowel. Modern-day New York City English also has rounded /ɒː/ for reflexes of PALM, which ironically, came from an unrounded vowel.
- The cot–caught merger usually occurs in addition to the father–bother merger. This applies to almost all of Canadian English and many varieties of American English. The result is usually /ɑ(ː)/, the PALM vowel, which is used for LOT as well. Some dialects will have /ɒ(ː)/ as the merged vowel, not /ɑ(ː)/; these include Standard Canadian English or Pittsburgh English.
  - The caught-cot merger without the father–bother merger is found in Scottish English and most of New England English.
- In loanwords and names, the open central unrounded vowel [ä] in a source language is regularly approximated with /ɑ(ː)/ in North America and /æ/ in RP. However, in the case of mid back rounded vowels spelled ⟨o⟩, the usual North American approximation is /oʊ/, not /ɑː/ (in RP, it can be either /əʊ/ or /ɒ/). However, when the vowel is both stressed and word-final, the only possibilities in RP are /ɑː/ in the first case and /əʊ/ in the latter case, mirroring GA.

For the sake of simplicity, instances of an unrounded LOT vowel (phonetically [ɑ]) that do not merge with PALM/START are excluded from the table below. For this reason, the traditional Norfolk dialect is included but the contemporary one, nor the Cardiff dialect, are not.

/ɑː/ in native words and non-recent loanwords
| Variety | Rhotic | Mergers and splits | | | | | | | | | Possible spellings | | | | | |
| Variety | Rhotic | /ɒrV-ɑːrV/ merger | card-cord merger | cot-caught merger | father–bother merger | father–farther merger | god-guard merger | lot-cloth split | trap-palm merger | trap-bath split | ⟨a⟩ | ⟨ar⟩ | ⟨au⟩ (Note: Excluding words with anomalous pronunciations of ⟨au⟩ like laugh and aunt.) | ⟨aw⟩ | ⟨o⟩ | ⟨or⟩ |
|---|---|---|---|---|---|---|---|---|---|---|---|---|---|---|---|---|
| Australian English | no | no | no | no | no | yes | no | no | no | partial (Note: Complete before voiceless fricatives: /-f/, /-s/, /-θ/ but variable before nasals: /-mpəl/, /-nd/, /-nt/, /-ntʃ/, /-ns/.) | yes | yes | no | no | no | no |
| Canadian English | yes | no | no | yes | variable | —N/a | —N/a | —N/a | no | no | yes | no | yes | yes | yes | no |
| General American | yes | no | no | variable | yes | —N/a | —N/a | yes | no | no | yes | no | variable | variable | yes | no |
| Hiberno-English | yes | no | no | variable | no | —N/a | —N/a | variable | variable | variable | variable | no | no | no | no | no |
| New York City English | variable | possible | no | no | variable | variable | variable | yes | no | no | yes | no | no | no | variable | no |
| New Zealand English | mostly no | no | no | no | no | mostly yes | no | no | no | yes | yes | mostly yes | no | no | no | no |
| Northeastern New England English | variable | no | no | yes | no | variable | no | —N/a | no | no | yes | yes | no | no | no | no |
| Northern England English | no | no | no | no | no | yes | no | no | no | no | yes | yes | no | no | no | no |
| Philadelphia English | yes | possible | no | no | yes | —N/a | —N/a | yes | no | no | yes | no | no | no | yes | no |
| Received Pronunciation | no | no | no | no | no | yes | no | no | no | yes | yes | yes | no | no | no | no |
| Scottish English | yes | no | no | mostly yes | no | —N/a | —N/a | —N/a (mostly) | mostly yes | mostly no | mostly no | no | no | no | no | no |
| South African English | mostly no | no | no | no | no | mostly yes | no | variable | no | yes | yes | mostly yes | no | no | no | no |
| Southern American English | variable | mostly no | mostly no | variable | yes | variable | variable | yes | no | no | yes | variable | variable | variable | yes | mostly no |
| Traditional Norfolk dialect | no | variable | no | no | variable | yes | variable | yes | no | yes | yes | yes | no | no | yes | no |
| Welsh English | mostly no | no | no | no | no | mostly yes | no | no | no | variable | yes | yes | no | no | no | no |

=== Fronting of GOAT ===
In many dialects of English, the GOAT vowel has undergone fronting from its earlier realization /oʊ/. The exact phonetic value varies; in Received Pronunciation, it is usually /əʊ/. The second element of the diphthong has also been fronted in many varieties. Dialects with fronting of the GOAT vowel include Received Pronunciation, Cockney, Estuary English, Australian English, New Zealand English and South African English, and Southern, Midland, and Mid-Atlantic American English. This fronting does not generally occur before /l/, a relatively retracted consonant.

== Table ==
Stages leading to some of the open back vowels of General American, summarized from Wells (1982), with the cot–caught merger added
| | law ball taught caught | off cloth loss | lot stop rob cot bother | father palm calm |
|---|---|---|---|---|
| Middle English | au̯ | ɔ | | a |
| Quality change | au̯ | ɒ | | a |
| Thought-monophthonging | ɔː | ɒ | | a |
| Pre-fricative lengthening | ɔː | ɒː | ɒ | a |
| A-lengthening | ɔː | ɒː | ɒ | aː |
| Quality change | ɔː | ɒː | ɒ | ɑː |
| Lot-unrounding | ɔː | ɒː | ɑ | ɑː |
| Loss of distinctive length | ɔ | ɒ | ɑ | |
| Cloth–thought merger | ɔ | | ɑ | |
| General American output | ɔ | | ɑ | |
| Cot–caught merger | ɑ | | | |

== See also ==
- Phonological history of English
- Phonological history of English vowels

== Bibliography ==
- Barber, Charles Laurence (1997). Early modern English (second ed.). Edinburgh: Edinburgh University Press. ISBN 0-7486-0835-4.
- Labov, William; Ash, Sharon; Boberg, Charles (2006). The Atlas of North American English: Phonetics, Phonology, and Sound Change: a Multimedia Reference Tool. Berlin; New York: Walter de Gruyter. ISBN 3-11-016746-8.
- Ostalski, Przemysław (2009). "Back Vowels in British and American English" (PDF). Przedsiębiorczość I Zarządzanie. 5 (4): 105–118.
- Wells, John C. (1982). Accents of English. Vol. 1: An Introduction (pp. i–xx, 1–278), Vol. 2: The British Isles (pp. i–xx, 279–466), Vol. 3: Beyond the British Isles (pp. i–xx, 467–674). Cambridge University Press. doi:10.1017/CBO9780511611759, doi:10.1017/CBO9780511611766. ISBN 0-52129719-2, 0-52128540-2, 0-52128541-0.
