= Good American Speech =

20th-century consciously learned American accent

Good American Speech, a Mid-Atlantic accent, or a Transatlantic accent is a consciously learned accent of English that was promoted in certain American courses on acting, voice, and elocution from the early to mid-20th century. As a result, it has become associated with particular announcers and Hollywood actors, most of whose work dates from the 1920s through the 1950s. This speaking style was largely influenced by and overlapped with Northeastern elite accents from that era and earlier. Out of conflation of the two types of accents, both have become commonly known as Mid-Atlantic or Transatlantic accents. Proponents of such accents additionally incorporated features from Received Pronunciation, the prestige accent of British English, in an effort to make them sound like they transcended regional and even national borders.

During the early half of the 20th century, Mid-Atlantic classroom speech was designed, codified, and advocated by certain phoneticians and teachers in the U.S., linguistic prescriptivists who felt that it was the best or most proper way to speak English. According to the voice and drama professor Dudley Knight, "its earliest advocates bragged that its chief quality was that no Americans actually spoke it unless educated to do so". During the period when Mid-Atlantic accents acquired cachet within the American entertainment industry, certain stage and film actors performed them in classical works or when undertaking serious, formal, or upper-class roles, while others adopted them more permanently in their public lives. After the mid-20th century, the accent became regarded as affected and is now rare.

== Terminology ==
No consistent label exists for this type of speech, particularly in its own era. It has increasingly become known as a Mid-Atlantic accent or Transatlantic accent, terms that refer to its perceived mixture of American and British features. In specifically theatrical contexts, it is also sometimes known by names like American Theatre Standard or American stage speech. Its promoters variously called it World (Standard) English, Good (American) Speech, Eastern (American) Standard, or simply Standard English.

== History ==
=== Origins ===
According to the vocal coach and drama professor Dudley Knight, in the 19th century through the early 20th century, formal public speaking in the United States primarily focused on song-like intonation, lengthily and tremulously uttered vowels (including overly articulated weak vowels), and a booming resonance. He also asserts that, when the 20th century began, "American actors in classical plays all spoke with English accents", due to the high prestige of English Received Pronunciation (RP), the standard accent of England, a label that emerged in the 1920s. One of the most notable RP features is non-rhoticity, or R-dropping: the deleting of the phoneme /r/ everywhere except before vowel sounds. The authors of the 2006 work Atlas of North American English describe non-rhoticity "as a characteristic of British Received Pronunciation, was also taught as a model of correct, international English by schools of speech, acting, and elocution in the United States up to the end of World War II. It was the standard model for most radio announcers". Linguist Geoff Lindsey argues that another major contribution to the RP elements in early Hollywood sound films is the simple fact that many of the actors themselves originated from around the British Commonwealth, throughout which RP was the educated standard.

Even before the early 20th century, ordinary Eastern New England accents as well as Northeastern elite accents spoken by groups like the New York elite and the Boston Brahmins, the coastal New England upper class, already shared notable features with RP such as non-rhoticity and the trap–bath split. Boston was the American center for training in elocution, public speaking, and acting in the very early 20th century; therefore, these Northeastern-originated accents also likely contributed to those features becoming popular in American theatre and cinema. Educated Northeastern American and RP accents already were regarded as prestigious before, and during the early decades of, the 20th century.

The codification of a Mid-Atlantic accent for American classrooms was largely initiated by the Australian phonetician William Tilly (né Tilley), who championed a version of the accent that, for the first time, was standardized with an extreme and conscious level of phonetic consistency. Teaching in Columbia University's extension program in New York City from 1918 to around the time of his death in 1935, he sought to popularize his standard of a "proper" American pronunciation for teaching in public schools and using in one's public life. A proponent of precise phonetic transcription, Tilly was perhaps the most influential speech instructor in the U.S. in the first half of the 20th century. Calling his new standard World English, he mostly attracted a following of English-language learners and New York City public-school teachers. Ordinary Americans have the tendency to perceive World English as sounding British, which Tilly's students sometimes acknowledged and other times denied. According to Dudley Knight:

World English was a speech pattern that very specifically did not derive from any regional dialect pattern in England or America, although it clearly bears some resemblance to the speech patterns that were spoken in a few areas of New England, and a very considerable resemblance ... to the pattern in England which was becoming defined in the 1920s as "RP" or "Received Pronunciation". World English, then, was a creation of speech teachers, and boldly labeled as a class-based accent: the speech of persons variously described as "educated," "cultivated," or "cultured"; the speech of persons who moved in rarefied social or intellectual circles; and the speech of those who might aspire to do so.

=== Popularity in American entertainment ===
Linguistic prescriptivists, William Tilly and his adherents emphatically promoted his World English (and their slight variations on it) in their courses. While Tilly did not specifically work with actors himself, several prominent students of his ended up doing so, establishing this type of pronunciation among classical actors in the U.S. for roughly three decades. Among Tilly's several disciples who popularized Mid-Atlantic accents in the American theatre were, most prominently, Windsor Daggett, Margaret Prendergast McLean, and Edith Warman Skinner.

Windsor Daggett was a Northeastern American speech teacher and theatre critic who campaigned for this accent in the American entertainment world in his weekly Billboard column from 1921 to 1926. During that decade, he also dominated the New York City market for theatrical speech improvement. Daggett viewed the accent, which he simply called Standard English, as neither regionally American nor an "affected ultra-British class dialect" but rather a cultured, intelligible, transnational accent of English that avoided all features that could identify its speaker's upbringing. Margaret Prendergast McLean from Colorado became one of the most influential speech teachers for East Coast actors by the late 1920s, distinguished for her work at Boston's Leland Powers School and New York's American Laboratory Theatre. She published her text on the accent, Good American Speech, in 1928 and later taught in Los Angeles, California. Canadian-born Edith Skinner, brought to the Laboratory Theatre by McLean, rose to prominence by the 1930s, best known for her own instructional text Speak with Distinction, published in 1942. These Tilly-trained speech instructors referred to this accent as Good (American) Speech, which Skinner also called Eastern (American) Standard and which she described as the appropriate American pronunciation for "classics and elevated texts". She vigorously drilled her students in learning the accent at the Carnegie Institute of Technology (now, Carnegie Mellon) and, later, the Juilliard School. By the 1930s, largely due to Tilly's influence, nearly all texts on the topic of American speech and oratory contained phonetic notation.

=== Decline ===
From the 1920s to 1950s, the Mid-Atlantic accent was a popular affectation onstage, in many New York City schools, and in forms of high culture in North America. American cinema began in the early 1900s in New York City and Philadelphia before becoming largely transplanted to Los Angeles beginning in the mid-1910s, with talkies beginning in the late 1920s. Hollywood studios encouraged actors to learn this accent into the 1940s. Hollywood over time became less of a New York City-influenced enclave as it grew and attracted actors from everywhere, plus the film industry moved away from studio control over its artists, causing Mid-Atlantic speech (and generally features like non-rhoticity employed by such speech) to fall out of fashion by the mid-20th century. Since then, the majority class of rhotic accents, General American English, has dominated the American entertainment industry.

== Examples of performers ==
Examples of actors known for publicly using this accent include Laird Cregar, Sally Kellerman, Tammy Grimes, Fred Astaire, William Powell, Orson Welles, Westbrook Van Voorhis, the Canadian actor Christopher Plummer, and the British actor Michael Rennie. Some actors like Bette Davis and Katharine Hepburn are popularly described as having Mid-Atlantic stage accents, though it is difficult to extricate their onscreen accents and vocal training from their own regional Northeastern elite accents. Despite the rhotic accents of their native regions, some performers like Grace Kelly, Norma Shearer, and Ginger Rogers developed a Mid-Atlantic accent, including (variable) non-rhoticity and a trap–bath split, likely due to its high prestige in their era and their formal dramatic schooling. Roscoe Lee Browne, defying roles typically cast for black actors, also consistently spoke with a Mid-Atlantic accent. Vincent Price often used the accent in his performances, being from Missouri but attending elite Northeastern schools for high school and college, and also being British-trained. Patrick Cassidy noted that his father, actor and performer Jack Cassidy, affected the Mid-Atlantic accent, despite having a native New York accent. Alexander Scourby was an American stage, film, and voice actor who continues to be well known for his recording of the entire King James Bible completed in 1953. Scourby was often employed as a voice actor and narrator in advertisements and in media put out by the National Geographic Society with his refined Mid-Atlantic accent considered desirable for such roles.

Cary Grant had an accent that is often popularly described as "Mid-Atlantic", though his specific accent more naturally and unconsciously mixed British and American features, because he arrived in the United States from England at age 16.

=== Performed examples in 20th-century media ===
- Various accents of the Mid-Atlantic style are heard in the 1940 film The Philadelphia Story among the wealthy Philadelphia Main Line family around which the film centers.
- In the 1952 movie Singin' in the Rain, the elocution coach who entreats another character to use "round tones" is attempting to teach her this kind of American stage speech.
- Rosalind Russell performs this accent in the 1958 film Auntie Mame as the titular character, a glamorous socialite.
- In the Star Wars film franchise, the character Darth Vader (voiced by James Earl Jones) noticeably speaks with a deep bass tone and a Mid-Atlantic accent to suggest his position of high authority; Princess Leia (played by Carrie Fisher) and Queen Amidala (played by Natalie Portman) also use this accent when switching to a formal speaking register in political situations.
- Many 20th-century Disney villains speak with a Transatlantic accent (notably, Lucille La Verne's Evil Queen from Snow White, Eleanor Audley's Maleficent and Lady Tremaine, Betty Lou Gerson's Cruella de Vil, Pat Carroll's Ursula, Vincent Price's Professor Ratigan, Jonathan Freeman's Jafar, and Eartha Kitt's Yzma).

=== Performed examples in 21st-century media ===
Although it has disappeared as a standard of high society and high culture, the Transatlantic accent has still been heard in some media in the 21st century for the sake of historical, humorous, or other stylistic reasons.

- Elizabeth Banks uses the Mid-Atlantic accent in playing the flamboyant, fussy, upper-class character Effie Trinket in the Hunger Games film series, which depicts enormous class divisions in a futuristic North America.
- Mark Hamill's vocal portrayal of Batman villain the Joker adopts a highly theatrical Mid-Atlantic accent throughout the character's many animation and video game appearances.
- Evan Peters employs a Mid-Atlantic accent as James Patrick March, a ghostly serial killer from the 1920s on American Horror Story: Hotel, as does Mare Winningham as March's accomplice, Miss Evers.
- Catherine O'Hara used a unique, comedic accent as the character of Moira Rose in the Canadian sitcom Schitt's Creek, which the press has sometimes labeled "Mid-Atlantic".

== Phonology ==
Phonetic transcriptions for the Mid-Atlantic theatre accent were published by voice coaches like Margaret Prendergast McLean and Edith Skinner ("Good Speech" as she called it). These were once widely taught in Northeastern American acting schools of the early mid-20th century.

=== Vowels ===
English diaphoneme	Good American Speech		Franklin D. Roosevelt's Northeastern elite accent (for comparison)	Example
English diaphoneme	According to Skinner	According to McLean	Franklin D. Roosevelt's Northeastern elite accent (for comparison)	Example
Monophthongs
/æ/	[æ]		[æ]	trap
/æ/	[æ]		[æ̝]	pan
/ɑː/	[a]	[a], [ɑː]	[a]	bath
/ɑː/	[a]	[a], [ɑː]	[æ̈]	dance
/ɑː/	[ɑː]		[ɑə]	father
/ɒ/	[ɒ]		[ɑə]	lot, top
/ɒ/	[ɒ]		[ɔə]	cloth, gone
/ɔː/	[ɔː]		[ɔə]	all, taught, saw
/ɛ/	[e]	[e̞]	[ɛ]	dress, met, bread
/ə/	[ə]			about, syrup
/ə/	[o]	[o̞]	no data	obey, melody
/ɪ/	[ɪ]	[ɪ]	[ɪ̈]	hit, skim, tip
/ɪ/	[ɪ]	[ɪ̞]	[ɪ̈]	response
/i/	[ɪ]	[ɪ̞]	[ɪ̈]	city
/iː/	[iː]			beam, fleet, chic
/ʌ/	[ɐ]		[ʌ̈]	bus, gus, coven
/ʊ/	[ʊ]			book, put, would
/uː/	[uː]			glue, dew
Diphthongs
/aɪ/	[aɪ]		[äɪ]	shine, try bright, dice, pike, ride
/aʊ/	[ɑʊ]		[ɑ̈ʊ]	ouch, scout, now
/eɪ/	[eɪ]			lake, paid, pain, rein
/ɔɪ/	[ɔɪ]			boy, moist, choice
/oʊ/	[oʊ]	[o̞ʊ]	[ɔʊ]	goat, oh, show
Vowels historically followed by /r/
/ɑːr/	[ɑə]	[ɑː]	[ɑə]	car, dark, barn
/ɪər/	[ɪə]			fear, peer, tier
/ɛər/	[ɛə]	[ɛə~ɛː]	[ɛə]	fare, pair, rare
/ʊər/	[ʊə]			sure, tour, pure
/ɔːr/	[ɔə]	[ɔə~ɔː]	[ɔə]	torn, short, port
/ɜːr/	[ɜː~əː]			burn, first, herd
/ər/	[ə]			doctor, martyr, surprise

- Trap–bath split: The Mid-Atlantic accent commonly exhibits the TRAP-BATH split of RP. However, unlike in RP, the BATH vowel does not retract and merge with the back vowel of PALM. It is only lowered from the near-open vowel [æ] to the fully open vowel [a]. It was most consistently a feature of the New England upper class, the Boston Brahmins, but also promoted by theatrical teachers like McLean and Skinner.
- No /æ/ tensing: While most dialects of American English have the TRAP vowel tensed before nasals, the vowel is not necessarily tensed in this environment in Mid-Atlantic accents. Skinner and other theatrical teachers intensely discouraged tensing.
- No father-bother merger: The "a" in father is unrounded, while the "o" in bother may be rounded, like RP. Therefore, the father-bother distinction exists. The bother vowel is also used in words like "watch" and "quad".
- No cot–caught merger: The vowels in cot and caught (the LOT vowel and THOUGHT vowel, respectively) are distinguished, with the latter being pronounced higher and longer than the former, like RP.
  - Lot–cloth variability: Like modern RP, but unlike conservative RP and General American, Theatre Standard promoted that the words in the CLOTH lexical set use the LOT vowel rather than the THOUGHT vowel. The THOUGHT vowel is also used before /l/ in words such as "all", "salt", and "malt".
- Lack of HAPPY tensing: Like conservative RP, the vowel /i/ at the end of words such as "happy" [ˈhæpɪ], "Charlie", "sherry", "coffee" is not tensed and is thus pronounced with the KIT vowel [ɪ], rather than the FLEECE vowel [iː]. This also extends to "i", "y", and sometimes "e", "ie", and "ee" in other positions in words. For example, the KIT vowel is used in "cities", "remark", "because", "serious", "variable".
- No Canadian raising: Like RP, the diphthongs /aɪ/ and /aʊ/ do not undergo Canadian raising and are pronounced as [aɪ] and [ɑʊ], respectively, in all environments.
- Back /oʊ/, /uː/, /aʊ/: The vowels /oʊ/, /uː/, /aʊ/ do not undergo advancing, being pronounced farther back as [oʊ], [uː] and [ɑʊ], respectively, like in conservative and Northern varieties of American English; the latter two are also similar to conservative RP.
- No weak vowel merger: The vowels in "Rosas" and "roses" are distinguished, with the former being pronounced as [ə] and the latter as either [ɪ] or [ɨ]. This is done in General American, as well, but in the Mid-Atlantic accent, the same distinction means the retention of historic [ɪ] in weak preconsonantal positions (as in RP), so "rabbit" does not rhyme with "abbot".
- Lack of mergers before /l/: Mergers before /l/, which are typical of several accents, both British and North American, do not occur. For example, the vowels in "hull" and "bull" are kept distinct, the former as [ʌ] and the latter as [ʊ].

==== Vowels before /r/ ====
Mid-Atlantic accents are non-rhotic, meaning the postvocalic /r/ is typically dropped. The vowels /ə/ or /ɜː/ do not undergo R-coloring. Linking R is used, but Skinner openly disapproved of intrusive R. In Mid-Atlantic accents, intervocalic /r/'s and linking r's undergo liaison.

When preceded by a long vowel, the /r/ is vocalized to [ə], commonly known as schwa, while the long vowel itself is laxed. However, when preceded by a short vowel, the /ə/ is elided. Therefore, tense and lax vowels before /r/ are typically only distinguished by the presence/absence of /ə/. The following distinctions are examples of this concept:

- Mirror–nearer distinction: Hence mirror is [mɪɹə], but nearer is [nɪəɹə].
- Mary–merry distinction: Hence merry is [mɛɹɪ], but Mary is [mɛəɹɪ]. Mary also has an opener variant of [ɛ] than merry.

- "Marry" is pronounced with a different vowel altogether. See further in the bullet list below.

Other distinctions before /r/ include the following:

- Mary–marry–merry distinction: Like in RP, New York City, and Philadelphia, marry is pronounced as /æ/, which is distinct from the vowels of both Mary and merry.
- Cure–force–north distinction: The vowels in cure and force–north are distinguished, the former being realized as [ʊə] and the latter as [ɔə], like conservative RP.
- Thought–force distinction: The vowels in thought and force–north are distinguished, the former being realized as [ɔː] and the latter as [ɔə]. Hence saw [sɔː], sauce [sɔːs] but sore/soar [sɔə], source [sɔəs]. This does not precisely agree with /ɔː/ horse and /ɔə/ for hoarse in traditional Received Pronunciation.
- Hurry–furry distinction: The vowels in hurry and furry are distinguished, with the former pronounced as /ʌ/ and the latter pronounced as /ɜː/.
- Palm–start distinction: The vowels in palm and start are distinguished, the former being realized as [ɑː] and the latter as [ɑə]. Hence spa [spɑː], alms [ɑːmz] but spar [spɑə], arms [ɑəmz]. This keeps the distinction observed in rhotic accents like General American, but not made in RP. Also, some New Englanders, particularly in Eastern New England, could pronounce the vowel in start more fronted: [aː~aə]. However, in the mid-20th century and later, this came to be associated with non-elite Boston accents.
- Distinction of /ɒr/ and /ɔːr/ in words like orange and oral

=== Consonants ===
A table containing the consonant phonemes is given below:

Consonant phonemes
	Labial		Dental		Alveolar		Post-alveolar		Palatal	Velar		Glottal
Nasal		m				n					ŋ	
Stop	p	b			t	d				k	ɡ	
Affricate							tʃ	dʒ				
Fricative	f	v	θ	ð	s	z	ʃ	ʒ				h
Approximant						l		ɹ	j	ʍ	w	

- Wine–whine distinction: The Mid-Atlantic accent showed some vestigial resistance to the modern wine–whine merger. In other words, the consonants spelled w and wh could be pronounced slightly differently; words spelled with wh are pronounced as "hw" (/ʍ/). The distinction is a feature found in conservative RP and New England English, as well as in some Canadian and Southern United States accents, and sporadically across the Mid-West and the West. However, it is rarely heard in modern RP.
- Pronunciation of /t/: the alveolar stop /t/ can be pronounced as a glottal stop, [ʔ], only if it is followed by a consonant in either the same word or the following word. Thus grateful can be pronounced [ˈɡɹeɪʔfɫ̩]. However, Skinner recommended avoiding the glottal stop altogether; she also recommended a "lightly aspirated" /t/ in place of the flapped /t/ typical of American speakers whenever /t/ appears between vowels. Likewise, winter [ˈwɪntə] is not pronounced similarly or identically to winner [ˈwɪnə], as it is by some Americans. Generally, Skinner advocated for articulating /t/ with some degree of aspiration in most contexts.
- Resistance to yod-dropping: Dropping of /j/ only occurs after /r/, and optionally after /s/ and /l/. Mid-Atlantic also lacks palatalization, so duke is pronounced [djuːk] rather than [dʒuːk] (the first variant versus the second one here). All of this mirrors (conservative) RP.
- A "dark L" sound, [ɫ], may be heard for /l/ in all relevant contexts, more like General American than RP. However, Skinner explicitly discouraged darker articulations for actors.
- A tapped articulation of post-consonantal or inter-vocalic /r/ is heard in many of the very earliest recordings of formal performative or theatrical speakers born in the mid-19th century, likely a dramatic effect employed in public speaking then. However, it was rare in speakers born after that time, and Skinner disapproved of its usage.

=== Other pronunciation patterns ===
- Skinner approved of the -day suffix (e.g. Monday; yesterday) being pronounced as [deɪ] or as [dɪ] ("i" as in "did"), without any particular preference.
- Instead of the unrounded STRUT vowel, the rounded LOT vowel is used in everybody, nobody, somebody, and anybody; and when stressed, was, of, from, what. This is more like RP than General American. At times, the vowels in the latter words can be reduced to a schwa. However, "because" uses the THOUGHT vowel.
- Polysyllabic words ending in -ary, -ery, -ory, -mony, -ative, -bury, -berry: The first vowel in the endings -ary, -ery, -ory, -mony, -ative, -bury, and -berry are all pronounced as [ə], commonly known as a schwa. Thus inventory is pronounced [ˈɪnvɪntəɹɪ], rather than General American [ˈɪnvɨntɔɹi] or rapidly-spoken RP [ˈɪnvəntɹi].

Example		Mid-Atlantic
military	-ary	[əɹɪ]
bakery	-ery	[əɹɪ]
inventory	-ory	[əɹɪ]
Canterbury	-bury	[bəɹɪ]
blueberry	-berry	[bəɹɪ]
testimony	-mony	[mənɪ]
innovative	-ative	[ətɪv ~ ˌeɪtɪv]

== See also ==
- American English
- Atlas of North American English
- Cultivated Australian English
- Elocution
- General American English
- Queen's Latin
- Linguistic prescription
- Received Pronunciation

== General and cited bibliography ==
- Fletcher, Patricia (2005). Classically Speaking: Dialects for Actors : Neutral American, Classical American, Standard British (RP). Trafford. ISBN 9781412041218.
- Deacon, Desley (2007). "World English? How an Australian Invented 'Good American Speech'". Talking and Listening in the Age of Modernity.
- Gimson, Alfred C. (1962). An introduction to the pronunciation of English. Foreign Language Study.
- Labov, William; Ash, Sharon; Boberg, Charles (2006). The Atlas of North American English. Berlin: Mouton-de Gruyter. ISBN 3-11-016746-8.
- Skinner, Edith; Monich, Timothy (1990). Mansell, Lilene (ed.). Speak with Distinction (Second ed.). New York: Applause Theatre Book Publishers. ISBN 1-55783-047-9.
