= Northeastern elite accent =

Set of American English accents

A Northeastern elite accent is any of the related American English accents used by members of the wealthy Northeastern elite born in the 19th century and early 20th century, which share significant features with Eastern New England English and Received Pronunciation (RP), the standard British accent. The late 19th century first produced audio recordings of and general commentary about such accents used by affluent East Coast and Northern Americans, particularly those in New York and New England.

On the one hand, some scholars traditionally describe these accents as prescribed or affected ways of speaking, consciously acquired in elite private preparatory schools of that era. From the 1920s through 1950s specifically, these high-society speaking styles may overlap with a briefly fashionable accent taught in certain American courses on elocution, voice, and acting, including in several public and private secondary schools in the Northeast. Both types of accent are most commonly labeled a Mid-Atlantic accent or Transatlantic accent. On the other hand, linguist Geoff Lindsey argues that many Northern elite accents were not explicitly taught but rather persisted naturally among the upper class; linguist John McWhorter outlines a middle-ground possibility.

No consistent name exists for this class of accents. It has also occasionally been called Northeastern standard or cultivated American speech. Another similar accent, Canadian dainty, resulted from historical processes in Canada and existed for a century before waning in the 1950s.

== History ==
Since as late as the mid-19th century, upper-class Americans, particularly of the Northern and Eastern United States, are noted as adopting several phonetic qualities of Received Pronunciation—the standard accent of the British upper class—as evidenced in recorded public speeches of the time. One of these qualities is non-rhoticity, sometimes called "R-dropping", in which speakers delete the phoneme /r/ except before a vowel sound (thus, in pair but not pairing). This feature is also shared by the traditional regional dialects of Eastern New England (including Boston), New York City, and some areas of the South. Sociolinguists like William Labov and his colleagues note that non-rhoticity, "as a characteristic of British Received Pronunciation, was also taught as a model of correct, international English by schools of speech, acting, and elocution in the United States up to the end of World War II. It was the standard model for most radio announcers and used as a high prestige form by Franklin Roosevelt".

Early recordings of prominent Americans born in the middle of the 19th century provide some insight into their adoption, or not, of a carefully employed non-rhotic elite speaking style. President William Howard Taft, who attended public school in Ohio, and inventor Thomas Edison, who grew up in Ohio and Michigan in a family of modest means, both used natural rhotic accents. Meanwhile, Presidents William McKinley of Ohio and Grover Cleveland of Central New York, who attended private schools, clearly employed a non-rhotic, upper-class quality in their public speeches that does not align with the rhotic accents normally documented in Ohio and central New York at the time. Both men even used the distinctive, archaic affectation of a "tapped R" at times when R is pronounced, often when between vowels. This tapped articulation is sometimes heard in recordings of Theodore Roosevelt, McKinley's successor from an affluent district of New York City, who used a cultivated non-rhotic accent, but with the addition of the coil-curl merger, once notably associated with New York accents. His distant cousin Franklin D. Roosevelt also employed a non-rhotic elite accent, though without the tapped R or the merger.

In and around Boston, Massachusetts, in the late 19th and early 20th centuries, a similar accent was associated with the local urban elite: the Boston Brahmins. In the New York metropolitan area, particularly its affluent Westchester County suburbs and the North Shore of Long Island, some terms for the local Transatlantic pronunciation and accompanying facial behavior included "Locust Valley lockjaw" or "Larchmont lockjaw", named for the stereotype that its speakers clench their jaw muscles to achieve an exaggerated enunciation quality. The related term "boarding-school lockjaw" has also been used for the accent once considered a characteristic of elite New England boarding-school culture. This set of accents is also linked with Old Philadelphians of the Philadelphia Main Line in this period.

These accents rapidly declined after World War II, presumably as a result of cultural and demographic changes in the United States. These American versions of a "posh" accent have disappeared even among the American upper classes, as Americans have increasingly dissociated from all speaking styles of the East Coast since the mid-20th century.

== Notable speakers ==
Wealthy or highly educated Americans known as lifelong speakers of a Northeastern elite accent in the 20th century include political commentator William F. Buckley Jr.; authors Gore Vidal and H. P. Lovecraft; President Franklin D. Roosevelt, his mother Sara Roosevelt, and his wife Eleanor Roosevelt; Theodore Roosevelt's daughter Alice Roosevelt Longworth; politician and diplomat Averell Harriman; politician Dean Acheson; President John F. Kennedy and his wife Jacqueline Kennedy Onassis (who began affecting it permanently while at Miss Porter's School); novelists Louis Auchincloss and Norman Mailer; fashion columnist Diana Vreeland (though her accent was somewhat unique); actress and author C. Z. Guest; journalist Joseph Alsop; editor Robert Silvers; television chef Julia Child (though, as the lone non-Northeasterner in this list, her accent was consistently rhotic); newspaper publisher Cornelius Vanderbilt IV; and actress and socialite Gloria Vanderbilt. Except for Child, all of these speakers were raised, educated, or both in the Northeastern United States. This includes just over half who were raised in New York (most of them in New York City) and five who were educated at the independent boarding school Groton in Massachusetts: Franklin Roosevelt, Harriman, Acheson, Alsop, and Auchincloss.

Excerpt of FDR's "Fear Itself" speech

President Franklin Roosevelt, who came from a privileged family in the Hudson Valley north of New York City, had a non-rhotic accent, though it was not a New York City accent but rather an elite East Coast one. In one of his most often heard speeches, the "Fear Itself" speech, he uses non-rhotic pronunciations of words like assert and firm along with a falling diphthong in the word fear, all of which distinguish his accent from other forms of surviving non-rhotic speech in the United States. Also, in the same speech, linking R appears in his delivery of the words "The only thing we have to fear is fear itself"; this pronunciation of R is also recorded in his Pearl Harbor speech. His cousin Theodore Roosevelt, who grew up in New York City, also had a distinctive Northeastern elite accent.

People described as having a cultivated New England accent or "Boston Brahmin accent" include Henry Cabot Lodge, Charles Eliot Norton, Samuel Eliot Morison, Harry Crosby, John Brooks Wheelwright, George C. Homans, Elliot Richardson, George Plimpton (though he was a lifelong member of the New York City elite), former New Jersey governor Thomas Kean (educated in private schools throughout the Northeast), and Massachusetts Senator John Kerry, the last of whom reduced this accent since his early adulthood toward a more General American one.

Actors like Katharine Hepburn and Bette Davis used such accents, though possibly also influenced or reinforced by their formal dramatic training, which, in the early 20th century, was heavily Northeastern-oriented and somewhat British-oriented in sound. Anglo-American actor Cary Grant's accent, while popularly described as "Mid-Atlantic", was a natural mixture of both British and American features, because he grew up in England but moved to New York City at age 16, living there for the next decade.

Marianne Williamson, a self-help author and a 2020 and 2024 Democratic presidential candidate raised and educated in Texas, has a unique accent that was widely discussed after she participated in the first 2020 Democratic presidential debates in June 2019. The Guardian wrote that Williamson "speaks in a beguiling mid-Atlantic accent that makes her sound as if she has walked straight off the set of a Cary Grant movie".

== Fictional portrayals ==
Though these accents declined after World War II, they continued to be used for several decades by media when depicting elite or snobbish characters.

- Satirist Tom Lehrer lampooned the effete speech of Boston Brahmins in his 1945 song "Fight Fiercely, Harvard". Lehrer, who was raised in New York City and attended Harvard University, did not normally speak with a Mid-Atlantic accent, but he performed the song with some of its features, most notably non-rhoticity. Lehrer's various recordings of the song display these features to different degrees.
- Jim Backus and Natalie Schafer portrayed Thurston and Lovey Howell, a millionaire couple on the 1960s TV series Gilligan's Island; they both employed the Locust Valley lockjaw accent.
- David Ogden Stiers used the accent in portraying wealthy Bostonian Major Charles Emerson Winchester III on the TV series M*A*S*H.
- In the television sitcom Frasier this accent was used by the snobbish Crane brothers, who are played by Kelsey Grammer and David Hyde Pierce.

== Phonology ==
- Non-rhoticity, or "R-dropping", occurs in words like oar, start, there, etc. This is like British Received Pronunciation (RP) and certain other traditional American eastern and southern dialects, but unlike General American English (GA).
  - In the lexical set NURSE, most non-rhotic American accents preserve the /r/ sound. But like RP, older upper-class Northeastern accents drop the /r/ even in these words: first, pearl, her, etc.
- Trap–bath split: the vowels in TRAP and BATH were often not the same, most consistently a feature of the New England upper class, the Boston Brahmins, but variably also shared by the New York City elite and possibly other Northern American elite speakers born in the 19th century. However, unlike in RP, the BATH vowel does not retract and merge with the back vowel of PALM [ɑ]. It is only lowered from the near-open vowel [æ] to the fully open vowel [a].
- Father-bother merger: The "a" in father is traditionally unrounded, while the "o" in bother may be rounded, like in RP. Therefore, father and bother may fail to rhyme for some speakers, in New England for example, but rhyme for others, like Franklin Roosevelt, who merged the two vowels.
- Lot–cloth split: Speakers like Franklin Roosevelt tended to have a LOT-CLOTH split, with the CLOTH vowel aligning to the THOUGHT vowel. This deviates from Standard Southern British, which does not have the split.
- Thought–force variability: The vowels in thought and force–north are possibly distinguished by some ([ɔː] versus [ɔə]). Still, Franklin Roosevelt and the Boston Brahmins often merged THOUGHT and FORCE, and their vowel was often [ɔə], which is more diphthongal than in RP.
- Variability in happy tensing: Like in conservative RP, the vowel /i/ at the end of words such as "happy" [ˈhæpɪ], "Charlie", "sherry", "coffee", etc. is not necessarily tensed and is pronounced with the kit vowel [ɪ], rather than the fleece vowel [i]. Some speakers, though, including John F. Kennedy and certain Boston Brahmins, did participate in happy tensing.
- Dropping of /j/ rarely occurs—only after /r/, and optionally after /s/ and /l/, but not elsewhere. The word duke, for instance, is pronounced like upper-class British [djuːk] and neither like middle-class British [dʒuːk] (the first variant versus the second one here) nor like GA [duk]. Similarly, dew is not a homophone of either do [duː] or Jew [dʒuː]. All of this mirrors (conservative) RP.
- Intervocalic /t/ is sometimes preserved (thus, more fully pronounced in a word like waiter, so that it does not sound exactly like wader), avoiding the GA phenomenon of flapping in some speakers.
- As in RP and some American East Coast dialects like New York City English, but unlike GA, vowel distinctions before /r/ persist. Therefore, no Mary–marry–merry_merger or hurry-furry merger occurs; each of those words has a distinct vowel sound, so that none of them rhyme.
- In the following table, Northeastern elite accents fit under the "Traditional American" column:

Distribution of /ɒr/ and prevocalic /ɔːr/ by dialect
	British RP	General American	Traditional American (Note: This here refers to accents of greater New York City, greater Philadelphia, the older Southern U.S., and the older Northeastern elite. It also includes some speakers, though particularly older ones, in Eastern New England (predominantly Rhode Island) and coastal states of the modern Southern U.S.)	Canada
Only borrow, sorrow, sorry, (to)morrow	/ɒr/	/ɑːr/	/ɒr/ or /ɑːr/	/ɔːr/
Forest, Florida, historic, moral, porridge, etc.	/ɒr/	/ɔːr/	/ɒr/ or /ɑːr/	/ɔːr/
Forum, memorial, oral, storage, story, etc.	/ɔːr/	/ɔːr/	/ɔːr/	/ɔːr/

American and British comparison of lexical sets with low vowels
KEYWORD	US			UK
KEYWORD	General American	Boston	Northeastern elite	Received Pronunciation
TRAP	æ	æ		
BATH	æ	a~æ	a~ɑ~æ	ɑ
START	ɑɹ	a	a~ɑ	ɑ
PALM	ɑ	a	ɑ	ɑ
LOT	ɑ	ɒ	ɑ~ɒ	ɒ
CLOTH	ɔ~ɑ	ɒ	ɒ~ɔ	
THOUGHT	ɔ~ɑ	ɒ	ɔ	

== See also ==
- Cultivated Australian English
- Queen's Latin
