= Queen's Latin =

Film and television trope

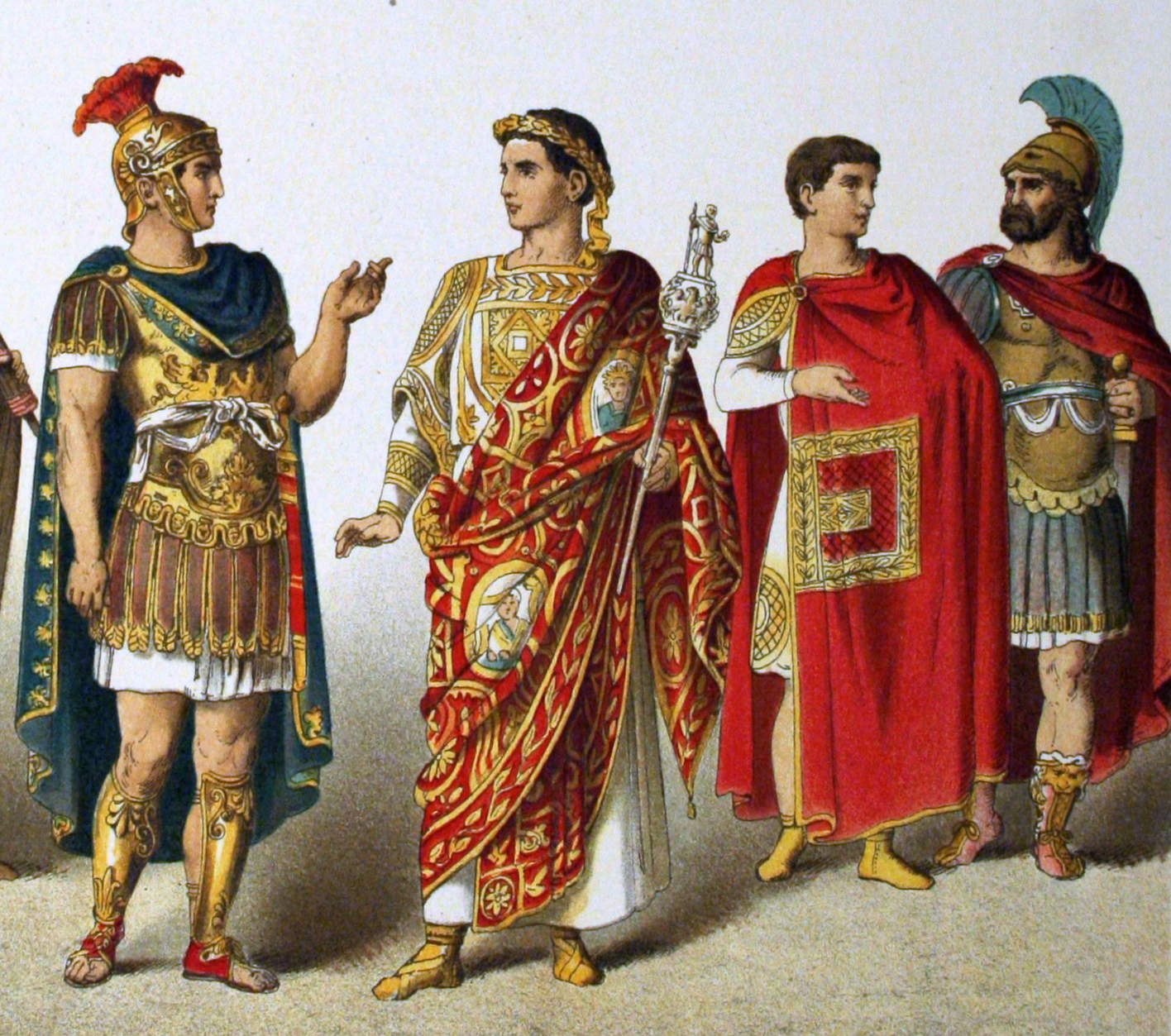
Romans in historical epics are often portrayed with posh British accents despite having no connection to modern English people.

The Queen's Latin is a trope in film, television, plays, and video games in which characters in historical drama or historical fantasy settings speak with British accents, particularly Received Pronunciation (RP), despite not being British and the story not being set in Britain. Sometimes referred to as imperial RP, ancient RP, Roman RP, or medieval RP, the trope is commonly associated with depictions of ancient civilizations, classical antiquity, medieval Europe, and fantasy worlds inspired by pre-modern societies, though it has been most strongly associated with the Roman Empire.

Some commentators have argued that British speech patterns are often perceived as formal, neutral, and sufficiently detached from everyday modern non-British speech to evoke a distant historical or fictional setting, as well as to convey authority, sophistication, villainy, or dramatic gravitas in English-language cinema, regardless of the setting or nationality of the characters. The convention also reflects perceptions that the use of modern American accents in films set before the 17th century is historically inauthentic, although American actors are often accepted in such roles when adopting British accents. The use of aristocratic or "imperial" English accents also appears in films set in the modern era.

Analysts have suggested that British accents came to be associated with prestige, sophistication, and historical drama in Hollywood, partly due to the influence of 20th-century Shakespearean theatre and actors such as Laurence Olivier. The Queen's Latin trope has long remained the default in historical films. Among the earliest films to popularize the trope were historical epics such as Julius Caesar (1953), Land of the Pharaohs (1955), and The Fall of the Roman Empire (1964), which featured British accents for characters from the ancient world.

== Origins and history ==
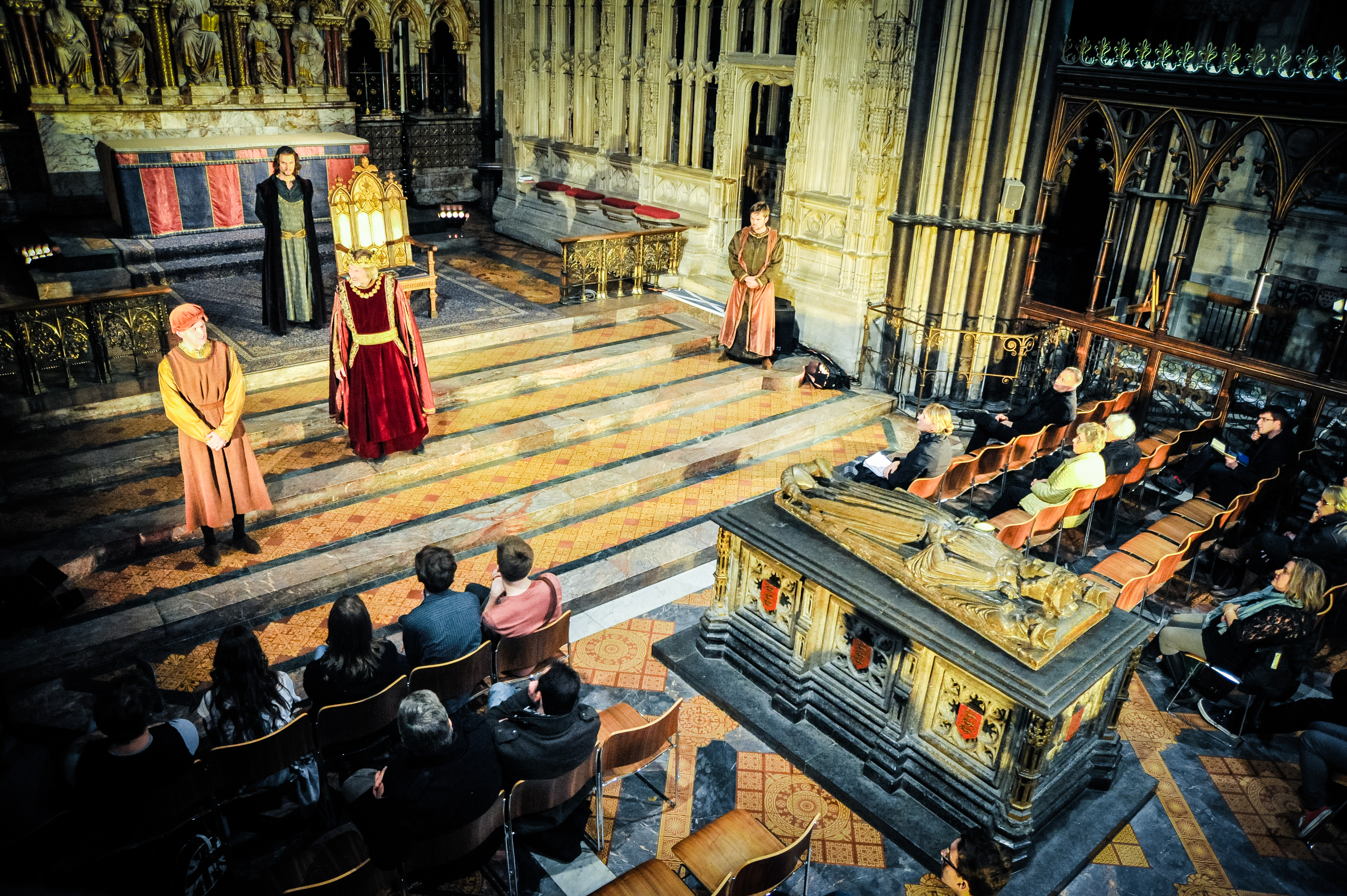
The use of RP in historical settings has often been linked to British Shakespearean theatre.

Some writers have attributed the association between British accents and depictions of ancient Romans to the influence of Shakespearean theatre, particularly Shakespeare's plays about figures such as Julius Caesar, Mark Antony, and Cleopatra. However, linguistic scholars have argued that Early Modern English pronunciation during the 16th and early 17th centuries differed significantly from modern Received Pronunciation, bearing closer similarities to certain Scottish and even Appalachian English speech patterns. Some writers have argued that modern audience expectations surrounding British-accented Romans were shaped less by Shakespearean theatre itself than by 20th-century historical films. Some columnists have also compared the Queen's Latin trope to the earlier use of the Mid-Atlantic (Transatlantic) accent in American film and broadcasting during the early 20th century.

Writing for Hyperallergic, historian Gregory Aldrete argued that Queen's Latin became more firmly established in mid-20th century cinema. Aldrete noted that Cecil B. DeMille's The Sign of the Cross (1932) used British accents for antagonistic Roman characters such as Emperor Nero, while DeMille's later film Cleopatra (1934) received criticism for its use of more colloquial American accents. The use of British accents for Roman characters became increasingly common in historical epics during the 1940s and 1950s. Reviewers have also linked the convention to the prominence of Biblical epics in mid-20th century American cinema, and have argued that accent usage in historical epics and sword and sandal films often reflected broader cultural and political symbolism.

=== Establishment in historical epics ===
Quo Vadis (1951) employed a contrast between more American-accented Christian protagonists and British-accented Roman elites, anticipating later historical epics that associated British speech with Roman authority and aristocratic status. British actors such as Peter Ustinov and Leo Genn portrayed members of the Roman elite, while American actor Robert Taylor portrayed the sympathetic Roman protagonist Marcus Vinicius. Jacobs noted that in The Ten Commandments (1956), directed by Cecil B. DeMille, the Hebrew characters predominantly speak with American accents, while many of the Egyptian characters use British accents, which Andrew Jacobs of the Harvard Divinity School interpreted as reinforcing themes of freedom versus tyranny.

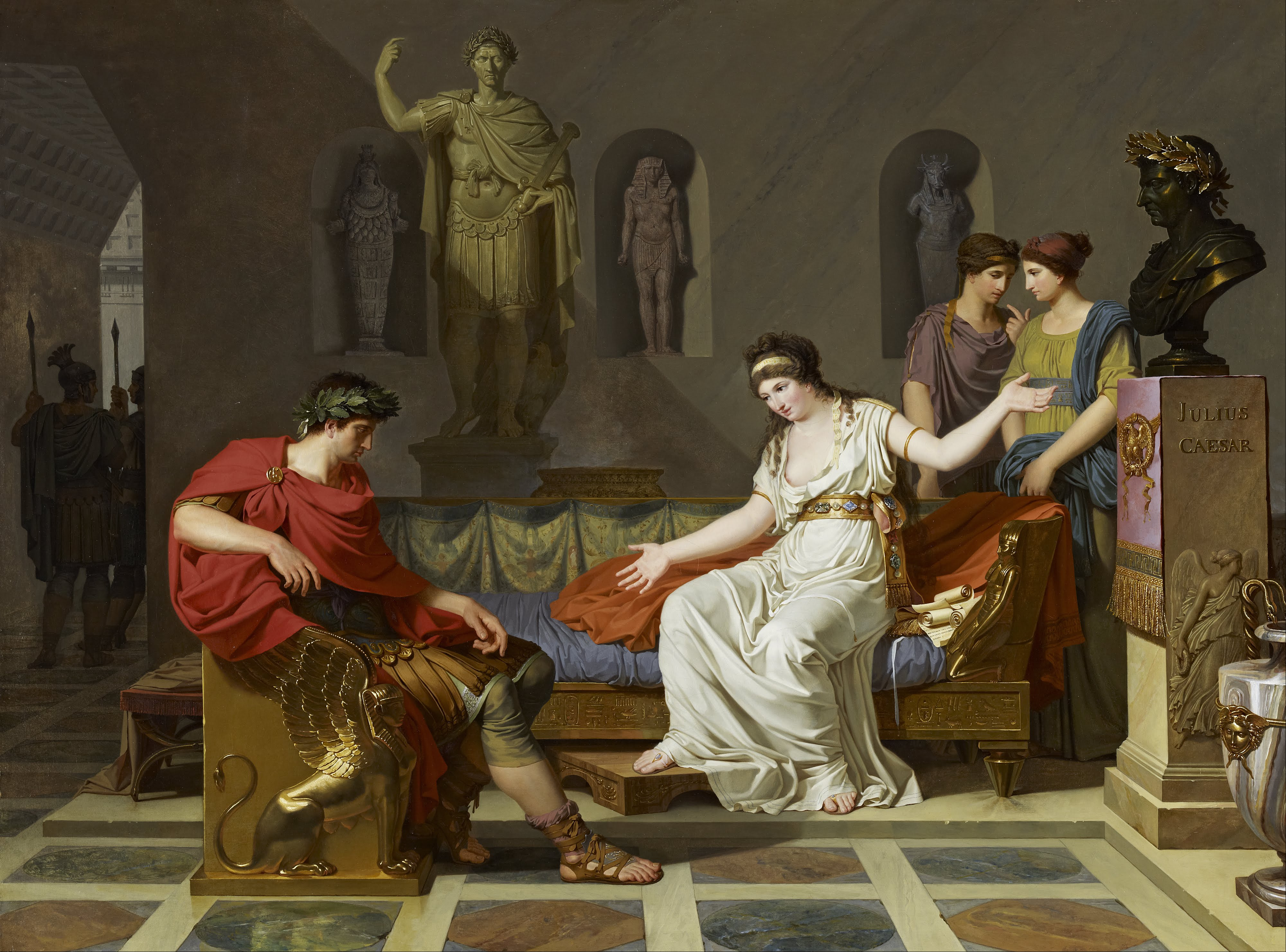
Golden Age historical epics often portrayed noble Romans and Egyptians speaking in "Queen's Latin".

The Robe (1953) continued the emerging convention of British-accented Roman elites in Biblical epics, with Emperor Tiberius, portrayed by Ernest Thesiger, speaking with a Received Pronunciation accent. In The Egyptian (1954), aristocratic Egyptian characters were generally portrayed using British accents, while several military and lower-status characters spoke with American accents, echoing a longstanding Hollywood convention in which British accents signify nobility and social prestige. Screenwriter Philip Dunne later recalled that Marlon Brando believed that "all kings, emperors and nobility should be played by English actors". Helen of Troy (1956) continued the broader convention of British-accented performances in historical epics set in the ancient Mediterranean world. Reviewers noted the film's predominantly British character actors and the dubbing of European leads whose native accents differed from the film's theatrical English-language style. Alexander the Great (1956) also employed British-influenced accents in depictions of the ancient Mediterranean world.

Andrew Jacobs similarly observed that Ben-Hur (1959) contrasted American-accented Jewish characters with upper-class British-accented Romans. Film historian Monica Silveira Cyrino described this tendency as part of a broader "linguistic paradigm" in mid-20th-century historical cinema, in which American accents were often associated with virtue, liberty, or religious sincerity. In Spartacus (1960), the enslaved gladiators generally speak with American accents, while Roman elites use British accents. King of Kings (1961) continued the broader convention of Biblical epics employing theatrical British and British-influenced performances for Roman and aristocratic authority figures despite its first-century Judean setting. Cleopatra (1963) featured both heroic and Roman characters speaking with British-style accents, marking a departure from earlier epics that more strongly associated British accents with Roman antagonists. Elizabeth Taylor, portraying Cleopatra, spoke with a more refined Transatlantic accent, while Richard Burton, portraying Mark Antony, used an upper-class British accent, contributing to the film's mixture of prestige English-language speech conventions.

=== Expansion beyond historical epics ===
The mythological fantasy film Jason and the Argonauts (1963) also followed broader historical fantasy conventions of using British accents. American actors Todd Armstrong and Nancy Kovack were dubbed by British voice performers after producers reportedly considered their American accents incompatible with the predominantly British cast. In Julius Caesar (1970), most of the cast portrayed Roman characters using British accents, while American actor Charlton Heston, portraying Mark Antony, adopted a partially British-inflected delivery in several scenes, reinforcing the strong association between Roman authority and British prestige speech in historical cinema. Productions such as the BBC series I, Claudius (1976) and the comedy film Monty Python's Life of Brian (1979) portrayed Roman characters more sympathetically. Historian Gregory Aldrete argued that portrayals of Romans became increasingly sympathetic during the 1980s, reflecting closer cultural and political ties between the United States and the United Kingdom. Set in 17th-century France, The Three Musketeers (1973) predominantly featured English and British-accented performances, with one reviewer noting that French actor Jean-Pierre Cassel was dubbed because his French accent would otherwise have sounded "out of place".

Like many English-language depictions of ancient Rome, Caligula (1979) featured a predominantly British cast portraying Roman characters using British accents. Set in medieval Italy, American actor Matthew Broderick received criticism for his attempted British accent in Ladyhawke (1985), with one reviewer describing the performance as displaying an "uncertainty with a British accent" that was "periodically cringeworthy and sporadically risible". Set in a fictional kingdom, The Princess Bride (1987) featured Robin Wright performing a British-style accent in her portrayal of Princess Buttercup, with commentators later praising the effectiveness of her accent work in the fantasy setting.

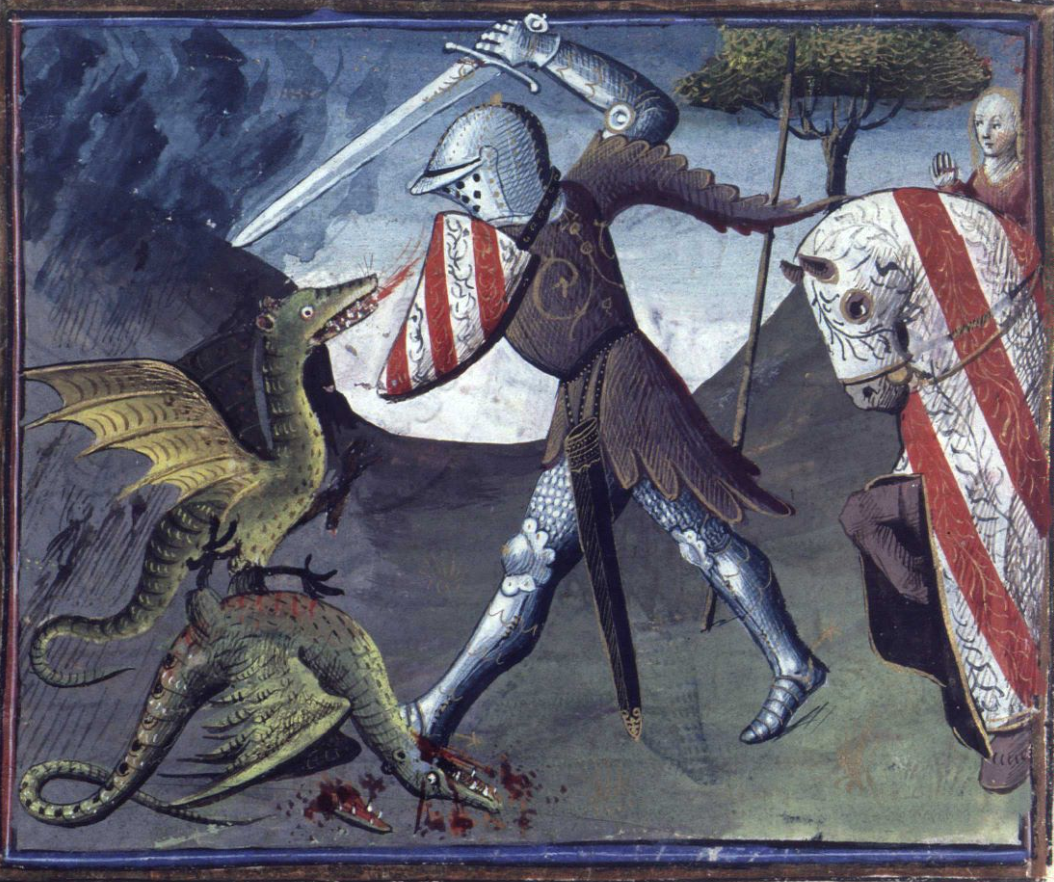
Historical fantasy and sword and sorcery productions set outside Britain have also frequently used British accents for medieval-inspired settings.

In History of the World, Part I (1981), Shecky Greene portrayed the Roman general Marcus Vindictus using exaggerated aristocratic mannerisms and speech patterns, parodying the association of Roman authority with upper-class English-speaking conventions in historical epics. The Last Temptation of Christ (1988) portrayed Roman characters using more formal British-style accents while many common Judean characters spoke with American and regional accents. Similarly, in The Prince of Egypt (1998), Egyptian royal characters were voiced predominantly by British actors including Ralph Fiennes, Patrick Stewart, and Helen Mirren, while many Hebrew and Midianite characters were voiced by American actors such as Val Kilmer, Sandra Bullock, and Jeff Goldblum, echoing a long-term practice in biblical and historical cinema whereby elite or imperial characters speak with British accents.

=== Mainstream rise in fantasy and historical media ===
In Gladiator (2000), Joaquin Phoenix, portraying Emperor Commodus, adopted a British accent associated with aristocratic status, while Russell Crowe, portraying Maximus, used a mixed Cultivated Australian and British-inflected accent. Connie Nielsen, portraying Lucilla, likewise spoke with a British accent consistent with the film's upper-class Roman characters. Director Ridley Scott stated that the accent was intended to reflect Maximus's provincial origins in Roman Spain rather than the elite culture of Rome itself. Some commentators questioned why the character did not instead use a Spanish accent or why a Spanish actor was not cast in the role. Media writers have noted that British accents are also commonly used in historical fantasy settings inspired by medieval Europe – In The Lord of the Rings film series, many hobbit characters speak with rural English accents, while socially prominent characters such as Frodo (played by American Elijah Wood) use more upper-class British speech patterns. In Shrek (2001), American actor John Lithgow used a posh British accent for his portrayal of the antagonist Lord Farquaad, contrasting with the more working-class speech patterns of the title character.

American actor Brad Dourif received praise for his British-accented portrayal of Gríma Wormtongue in The Lord of the Rings: The Two Towers (2002), having reportedly worked extensively to develop the accent for the role. Actors Brad Pitt, Eric Bana, and Rose Byrne adopted English-style accents in Troy (2004). The 2005 HBO/BBC series Rome have been cited as examples of audience expectations that characters from the classical world speak with British accents. In The Fountain (2006), Hugh Jackman and Rachel Weisz used American accents in the film's contemporary storyline, while Jackman adopted a British accent and Weisz used her native British accent in the 16th-century Spanish Inquisition scenes, in which she portrayed Isabella I of Castile. In the historical fantasy film 300 (2006), Irish actor Michael Fassbender and Australian actor David Wenham both employed English-inflected accents in their portrayals of the Spartan warriors Stelios and Dilios, respectively. Set during the collapse of the Western Roman Empire, The Last Legion (2007) employed predominantly British and British-influenced speech patterns despite its late Roman setting.

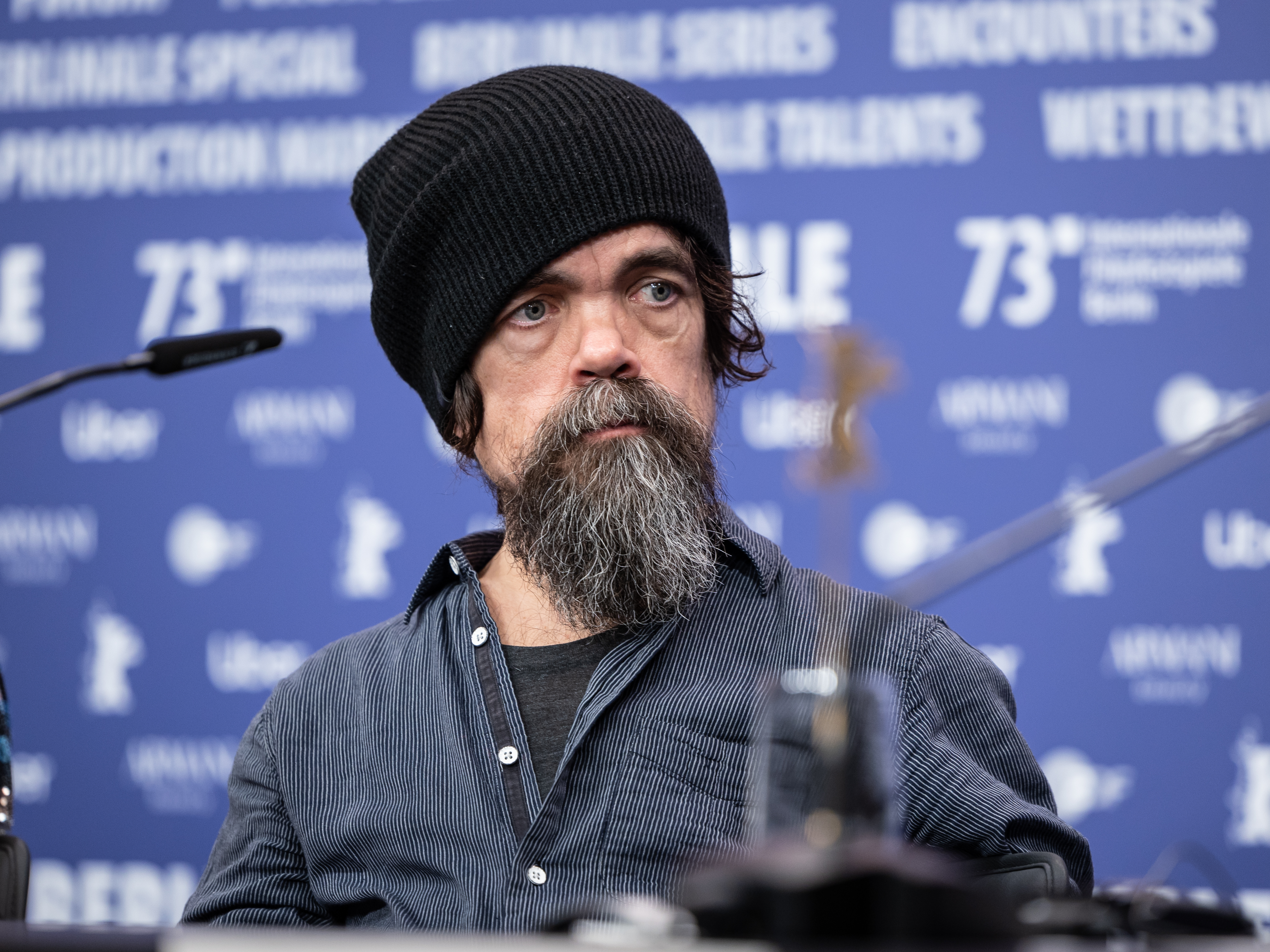
Peter Dinklage received praise for his RP accent in his portrayal of Tyrion Lannister, a nobleman from the fictional kingdom of Westeros in Game of Thrones.

Set in Roman Egypt, Agora (2009) followed the broader convention of historical epics featuring British-accented performances despite their ancient Mediterranean settings, with American actor Oscar Isaac adopting a British-style accent in his portrayal of Orestes. American actor Jake Gyllenhaal employed a Received Pronunciation-style British accent for his titular role in Prince of Persia: The Sands of Time (2010), later describing the accent as a challenge during production. The historical fantasy television series Game of Thrones featured characters from different fictional regions portrayed using various accents from across the British Isles, while American actor Peter Dinklage performed with an upper-class English accent for his role as Tyrion Lannister, with noble and aristocratic characters from the fictional kingdom of Westeros frequently employing posh or Received Pronunciation-style accents. Dinklage later stated that a New York accent "wouldn't work" for the character.

=== Continued prominence in blockbuster media ===
Australian actor Chris Hemsworth stated that he adopted a British accent for his portrayal of Thor in Thor (2011) because it suited the film's mythological tone, remarking that a British accent would "fit that world". Furthermore, American actresses Jaimie Alexander and Rene Russo, portraying Sif and Frigga respectively, along with many of the Asgardian characters, spoke with British accents, evoking the film's quasi-medieval and fantasy-inspired setting. In the medieval fantasy comedy Your Highness (2011), American actors James Franco and Natalie Portman used exaggerated British-style accents, aligning with the convention of employing English speech patterns in medieval-inspired fantasy settings. American actress Angelina Jolie received praise for her British-accented portrayal of the title character in Maleficent (2014). American actor Lee Pace used an English-style accent for his portrayal of the elven king Thranduil in The Hobbit film series. In Mirror Mirror (2012), American actress Julia Roberts used a British accent for her portrayal of the Evil Queen.

In Exodus: Gods and Kings (2014), American actor John Turturro and Australian actor Joel Edgerton adopted British accents for their portrayals of Seti I and Ramses II, respectively. In Pompeii (2014), Canadian actor Kiefer Sutherland adopted a British-style accent for his role as Corvus, although his performance and accent received mixed reactions from critics. Australian actress Emily Browning also performed with an English-inflected accent. In The Legend of Hercules (2014), American actor Kellan Lutz adopted a British-style accent for his portrayal of Hercules, with one reviewer describing him as having to "fake the classic British accent" despite Greek setting. In the Canadian miniseries Tut (2015), Canadian actor Avan Jogia, portraying Tutankhamun, performed with a British accent despite the production's multicultural cast, consistent with the longstanding association of prestige British speech with royal and historical characters in English-language historical dramas. Gods of Egypt (2016) featured predominantly white actors using British and British-influenced accents. Ben-Hur (2016) featured British accents despite its Judean setting, with one reviewer sarcastically describing the film's "limey accents" as "indisputable proof that British imperialism was alive and well in Jerusalem in century one".

The Young Messiah (2016) featured British and British-influenced accents despite its first-century Judean setting – Reviewers noted the film's use of British accents as part of the longstanding convention in Biblical cinema, with one critic remarking that the principal cast "could easily pass for guest stars on Downton Abbey". Risen (2016) featured Roman and Judean characters speaking with British and British-influenced accents despite its first-century setting. Reviewers noted the film's use of "the King’s English" and Oxford-style accents for both Romans and Jews, while others described the production as continuing the longstanding convention of British accents representing Roman authority figures. Irish actor Paul Mescal, portraying Lucius, and American actor Fred Hechinger, portraying Caracalla, both use Received Pronunciation in Gladiator II (2024). American actor Charlie Plummer adopted a British accent for his portrayal of Telemachus in The Return (2024). Plummer stated that director Uberto Pasolini asked him to model his voice after Ralph Fiennes, who portrays Odysseus in the film, and he subsequently worked with a dialect coach to achieve the accent.

== Reception and interpretation ==
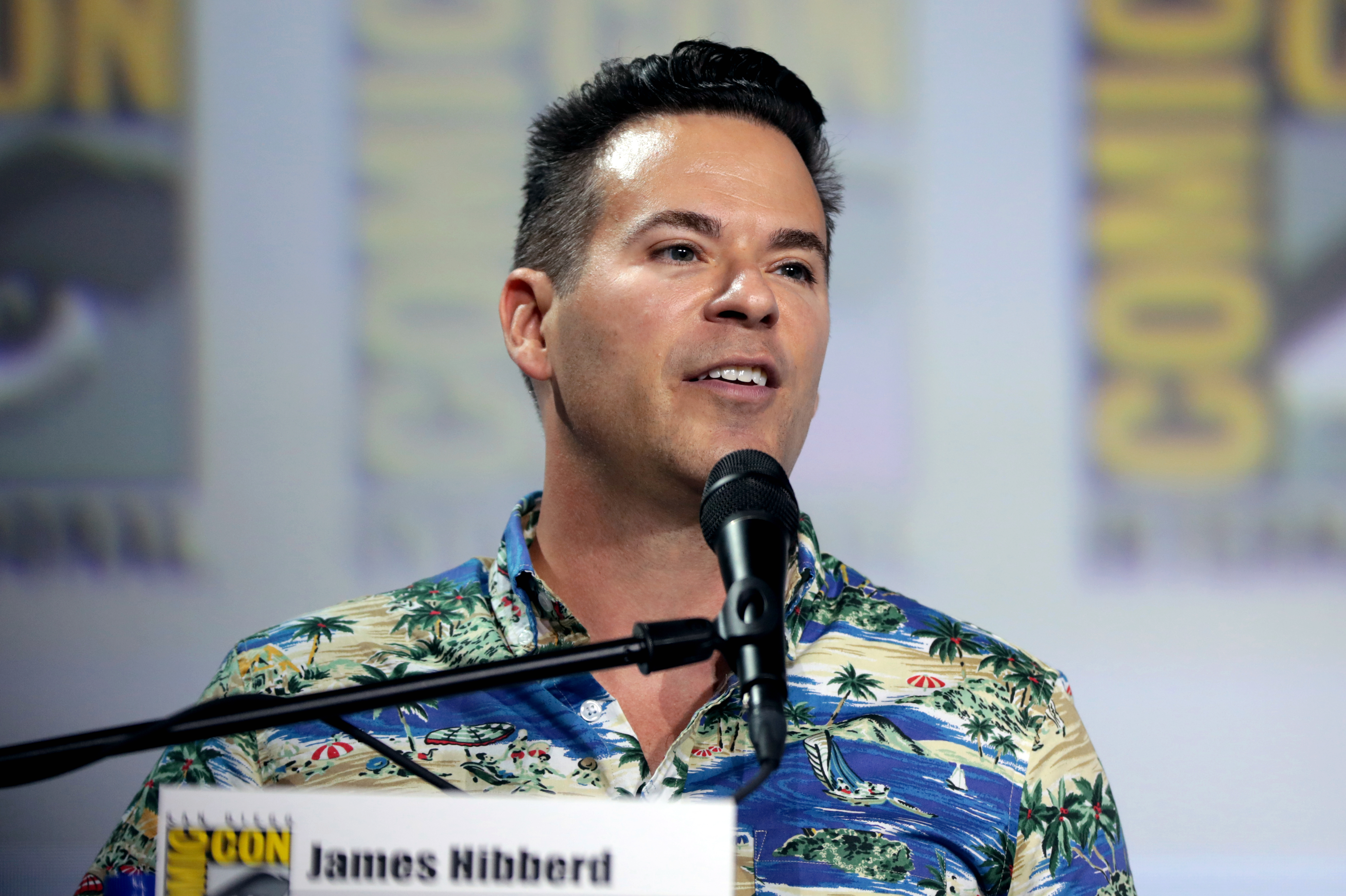
James Hibberd of The Hollywood Reporter described the convention as "an unwritten Hollywood rule" in which characters in historical epics employ British accents.

James Hibberd of The Hollywood Reporter remarked that British accents in historical epics are "traditionally considered universally pleasing and 'just foreign enough' to convey a timeless quality", despite only existing in their current form for roughly the past 250 years. Commentators have suggested that, within the predominantly American entertainment industry, British accents provide a sense of "otherness" when contrasted with more neutral American speech patterns. Some critics have argued that British accents are often used in fantasy and historical productions because they are perceived by audiences as both exotic and easily comprehensible in English-language media.

Writing for Contrarian, James Downie observed that Hollywood sword-and-sandal epics have traditionally portrayed ancient Romans with upper-class British accents. He argued that the convention serves both as an easily recognisable marker of foreignness for American audiences and as an implicit association between the British Empire and the Roman Empire, reinforcing themes of imperial power and authority. Some analysts have suggested that have argued that fictional fantasy settings are often loosely modeled on medieval European cultures and societies, leading modern British accents to be perceived by audiences as more fitting or authentic for such worlds. Critics have suggested that contemporary American accents can appear out of place in medieval-inspired settings, partly because of their strong association with the modern United States and contemporary culture. Critics of the convention have questioned why British accents are frequently treated as the default for non-English historical settings rather than other accents or performers' natural speaking voices. British accents have frequently been used not only for historical characters, but also for villains and other figures intended to convey authority or menace.

Dialect coach Erik Singer stated that audiences have become accustomed to hearing characters in films set in ancient Rome speak with Received Pronunciation (RP) or "Queen’s English" accents, describing the practice as a longstanding cinematic convention. Singer argued that RP functions as a prestige accent and has therefore frequently been associated with imperial power in historical films, drawing comparisons between the Roman Empire and the British Empire. Singer also suggested that some filmmakers have recently become more conscious and selective in their use of accents in historical productions. Critics have argued that professional actors are generally capable of learning culturally appropriate accents, but that many productions continue to rely on prestige English speech conventions inherited from earlier Hollywood and British cinema traditions.

Drawing on film scholar Richard Dyer’s work on whiteness and cultural norms, some writers have suggested that English accents in historical cinema are often treated as culturally "neutral" or universal, particularly when portraying European characters and settings. As a result, films set in places such as ancient Rome, 19th-century Germany, or Eastern Europe may present English accents as default speech forms, while non-English or more strongly marked accents are often reserved for characters portrayed as foreign, peripheral, or culturally "other". Critics have therefore argued that accent usage in such settings can reinforce distinctions between central and marginal characters through differing speech patterns. Some commentators have additionally argued that filmmakers could choose to employ accents or languages more reflective of the historical and cultural backgrounds of the characters being portrayed.

Surveys such as those conducted by YouGov have found that British accents are often perceived positively or regarded as attractive by audiences. Some literary critics have argued that the prominence of British accents in film is influenced both by audience perceptions and by Britain's historical cultural influence. Writers have suggested that posh or upper-class British accents are often associated with authority and sophistication, which can lend historical and dramatic productions a greater sense of status or importance in the eyes of audiences. Views on historical accuracy in accent usage have varied among critics and audiences. Some writers have argued that productions depicting historical settings should attempt to use accents that more closely reflect the cultures being portrayed, while others have suggested that consistency within a cast is more important than strict authenticity. Reviewers have noted that films and television series often prioritise stylistic, production, and accessibility considerations over linguistic accuracy, particularly when using multinational casts from different English-speaking backgrounds. Analysts of the convention have questioned why British accents are commonly preferred over other accents or performers' natural speaking voices, arguing that audiences are generally willing to suspend disbelief regarding language and pronunciation in historical fiction. Others have noted that fully authentic speech would require the use of ancient or historically accurate languages and dialects, which many productions avoid in favour of accessibility and immersion.

== Departures from the convention ==
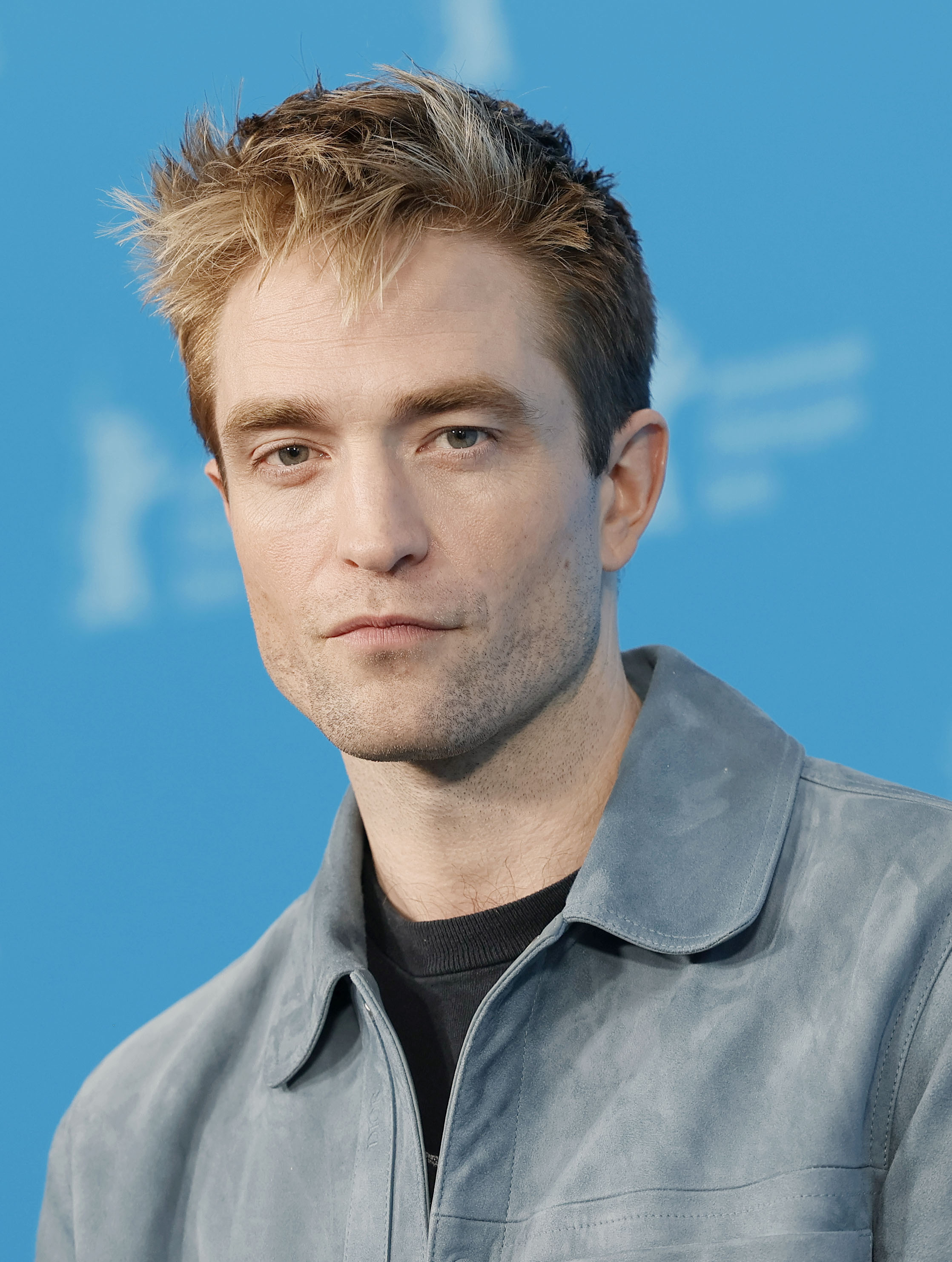
Although The Odyssey was criticised for its use of American accents, reviewers questioned why British actors Tom Holland and Robert Pattinson used them.

Some critics and viewers have expressed a preference for the traditional use of British-style accents in historical epic films, arguing that such accents have become an established convention of the genre. Critics have noted that non-British accent choices, particularly American accents, in historical and Biblical productions have often received mixed reactions. One frequently cited example is John Wayne's brief appearance as a Roman soldier in The Greatest Story Ever Told (1965), in which Wayne used his recognizable American drawl. Harvey Keitel's performance as Judas Iscariot in The Last Temptation of Christ (1988), delivered with a strong Brooklyn accent, received criticism from some reviewers, although director Martin Scorsese defended the film's use of modern accents and colloquial speech.

Critics have pointed to attempts to depart from the convention, such as Robin Hood: Prince of Thieves (1991), in which the American actor Kevin Costner performed without adopting a British accent despite the film being set in medieval England. The decision received mixed reactions, with analysts noting that the reception contributed to a continued reluctance to use modern American accents in historical productions. Critics of Dragonheart (1996) drew attention to the modern American accents used by Dennis Quaid and Dina Meyer in the medieval fantasy setting. Film critic James Berardinelli particularly criticized Meyer's performance, describing her contemporary American accent as anachronistic, while the Chicago Tribune remarked that Quaid sounded like a gruff actor from a B-movie western. Director Oliver Stone was criticised for having the cast of Alexander (2004) speak with Irish accents, a stylistic choice he defended by arguing that historical epic characters should not be restricted to speaking in Received Pronunciation (RP) or conventional British accents.

In Marie Antoinette (2006), director Sofia Coppola used deliberately modern stylistic elements, including Kirsten Dunst’s contemporary American "Valley girl" accent, modern music, and anachronistic costume details, to emphasise the film's stylised and modernised interpretation of the French queen's life. Sam Worthington's Australian accent was criticised for occasionally slipping through in Clash of the Titans (2010), creating a contrast with the film's broader use of British accents. The Eagle (2011) was criticized for not having its American cast, including Channing Tatum, use British accents traditionally associated with historical epics. Director Kevin Macdonald defended the decision, arguing that the use of American accents gave the film a contemporary symbolic dimension. Miles Russell, senior lecturer in Prehistoric and Roman Archaeology at Bournemouth University, likewise defended the choice, stating that the film functioned as a critique of modern Western intervention in Afghanistan and Iraq. Some productions have also been noted for inconsistencies in accent usage, such as Reign, in which the character Nostradamus speaks with actor Rossif Sutherland's native Canadian accent. Critics of Immortals (2011) also noted the film's mixture of British and American accents, which some reviewers described as jarring in the context of the mythological setting.

Productions like The Chosen (2017) have experimented with approximated Middle Eastern or regionally inspired accents rather than traditional British-style speech, a development some commentators have viewed as a departure from earlier conventions associated with historical and Biblical dramas. However, some critics found the American accents used for Roman soldiers in the show jarring, despite British accents being equally ahistorical. Napoleon (2023) featured predominantly French and Corsican characters, though most of the cast did not use French or Corsican accents. Joaquin Phoenix retained his natural American accent while portraying Napoleon, a decision that drew criticism and confusion from some critics and audiences. Gladiator II (2024) drew attention for its contrasting use of accents among its cast. Macrinus, portrayed by Denzel Washington, speaks with Washington's recognizable New York accent. Reactions to the trailer on social media included criticism of perceived historical inauthenticity and the use of modern American accents in a film set in ancient Rome. The Odyssey (2026) received online backlash over its use of American accents rather than the British-style accents traditionally associated with historical epics, with some viewers arguing that the contemporary dialogue and speech patterns felt anachronistic for a film based on ancient Greek literature.

== Modern European settings ==
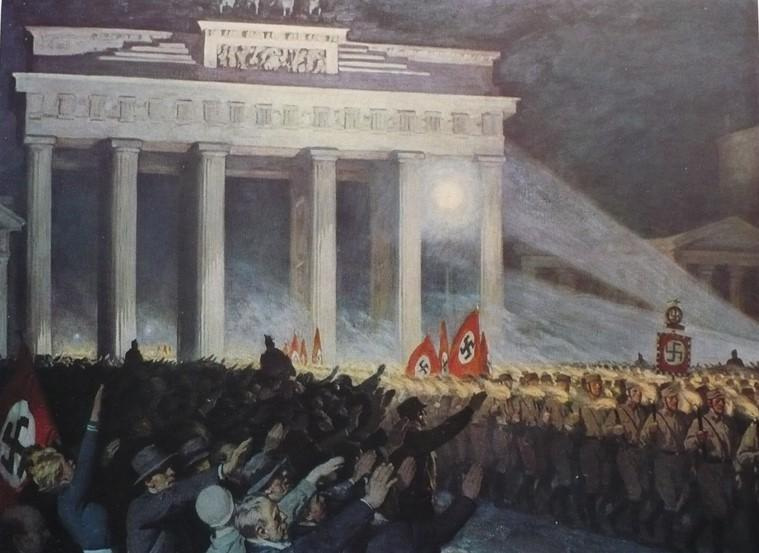
English-language films depicting the early modern period to the modern era, including Nazi Germany, have frequently portrayed characters using Received Pronunciation

Hollywood has also frequently employed aristocratic or vaguely "imperial" English accents in films set in European societies where English is not the native language. Commentators have noted the widespread use of British accents in films beyond depictions of the ancient Mediterranean world, including productions such as Les Misérables (2012), which is set in 19th-century France. Critics have argued that the convention reflects the dominance of British accents in English-language cinema, where such accents are often prioritised over historical or linguistic accuracy.

In Quills (2000), set in early 19th-century France, Joaquin Phoenix performed with an English accent alongside a predominantly British cast portraying French characters. Reviewing the film for The Guardian, critic Peter Bradshaw described Phoenix's performance as using "an English accent that he has evidently imported from Harrods". In The Affair of the Necklace (2001), set in pre-revolutionary France, critics noted the film's inconsistent use of accents, with several performers employing varying British-inflected speech patterns despite portraying French aristocrats. Reviewers also observed that Hilary Swank’s American accent occasionally remained noticeable beneath her attempted upper-class European delivery. In The Brothers Grimm (2005), set in early 19th-century Germany, Heath Ledger and Matt Damon both performed with British accents despite portraying German characters, mirroring the continued use of aristocratic or vaguely "imperial" English accents in non-English European settings. In The Boy in the Striped Pyjamas (2008), set in Nazi Germany, several characters portrayed Germans using upper-class British accents, including American actress Vera Farmiga.

This convention has also appeared in productions including Schindler's List (1993), The Pianist (2002), and the HBO miniseries Chernobyl (2019). Commentators have noted that Chernobyl (2019), set in the Soviet Union during the 1980s, used predominantly British accents rather than Russian-accented English. Director Johan Renck stated that the production avoided exaggerated Russian accents because he considered them distracting and unrealistic in English-language cinema. In Hugo (2011), set in 1930s Paris, most of the French characters were portrayed by British actors using English accents, while American actress Chloë Grace Moretz adopted a British accent for her role as Isabelle. Moretz later stated that director Martin Scorsese initially believed she was British during her audition. Robert Eggers’ 2024 film Nosferatu, a remake of F. W. Murnau’s 1922 German Expressionist horror film, is set in 1830s Germany but features a predominantly British, American, and French cast performing with English accents. Commentators noted that this created some confusion among viewers, as the film's Bavarian characters spoke with accents more commonly associated with English-language historical drama traditions than with German settings.

== See also ==
- Northeastern elite accent
- English-language accents in film
- Cultivated Australian English
- TV Tropes
