= Trap–bath split =

Vowel split in English

Trap–bath split
An example of the trap–bath split

The TRAP–BATH split is a vowel split that occurs mainly in Southern England English (including Received Pronunciation), Australian English, New Zealand English, Indian English and South African English; it also occurs to a lesser extent in some Irish English and Welsh English as well as older Northeastern New England English. The split entails the Early Modern English phoneme /æ/ lengthening in certain environments and ultimately merging with the long /ɑː/ of PALM. In that context, the lengthened vowel in words such as bath, laugh, grass and chance in accents affected by the split is referred to as a broad A (also called in Britain long A). Phonetically, the vowel is [ɑː] in Received Pronunciation (RP), Cockney and Estuary English; in some other accents, including Australian and New Zealand accents, it is a more fronted vowel ([ɐː] or [aː]) and tends to be a rounded and shortened [ɒ~ɔ] in Broad South African English. A trap–bath split also occurs in the accents of the Middle Atlantic United States (New York City, Baltimore, and Philadelphia accents), but it results in very different vowel qualities from the aforementioned British-type split. To avoid confusion, the Middle Atlantic American split is usually referred to in American linguistics as a 'short-a split'.

In accents unaffected by the split, words like bath and laugh usually have the same vowel as words like cat, trap and man: the short A or flat A. Similar changes took place in words with ⟨o⟩ in the lot–cloth split.

The sound change originally occurred in Southern England and ultimately changed the sound of /æ/ to /ɑː/ in some words in which the former sound appeared before /f, s, θ, ns, nt, ntʃ, mpəl/. That led to RP /pɑːθ/ for path, /tʃɑːnt/ for chant etc. The sound change did not occur before other consonants and so accents affected by the split preserve /æ/ in words like cat. (See the section below for more details on the words affected.) The lengthening of the bath vowel began in the 17th century but was "stigmatised as a Cockneyism until well into the 19th century". However, since the late 19th century, it has been embraced as a feature of upper-class Received Pronunciation.

== British accents ==
The presence or absence of this split is one of the most noticeable differences between different accents of England. An isogloss runs across the Midlands from the Wash to the Welsh border, passing to the south of the cities of Birmingham and Leicester. North of the isogloss, the vowel in most of the affected words is usually the same short-a as in cat; south of the isogloss, the vowel in the affected words is generally long.

There is some variation close to the isogloss; for example in the dialect of Birmingham (the so-called 'Brummie') most of the affected words have a short-a, but aunt and laugh usually have long vowels. Additionally, some words which have /æ/ in most forms of American English, including half, calf, rather, can't and shan't, are usually found with long vowels in the Midlands and Northern England. The split is also variable in Welsh English, often correlated with social status. In some varieties, such as Cardiff English, words like ask, bath, laugh, master and rather are usually pronounced with /ɑː/ while words like answer, castle, dance and nasty are normally pronounced with /æ/. On the other hand, the split may be completely absent in other varieties like Abercraf English and most of North Wales.

In northern English dialects, the short A is phonetically [a~a̠], while the broad A varies from [ɑː] to [aː]; for some speakers, the two vowels may be identical in quality, differing only in length ([a] vs [aː]). John Wells has claimed that Northerners who have high social status may have a trap–bath split and has posted on his blog that he grew up with the split in Upholland, Lancashire. A.F. Gupta's study of students at the University of Leeds found that (on splitting the country in two halves) 93% of northerners used [a] in the word bath and 96% of southerners used [ɑː]. However, there are areas of the Midlands where the two variants co-exist and, once these are excluded, there were very few individuals in the north who had a trap–bath split (or in the south who did not have the split). Gupta writes, 'There is no justification for the claims by Wells and Mugglestone that this is a sociolinguistic variable in the north, though it is a sociolinguistic variable on the areas on the border [the isogloss between north and south]'.

In some West Country accents of English English in which the vowel in trap is realised as [a] rather than [æ], the vowel in the bath words was lengthened to [aː] and did not merge with the /ɑː/ of father. In those accents, trap, bath, and father all have distinct vowels /a/, /aː/, and /ɑː/.

In Cornwall, Bristol and its nearby towns, and many forms of Scottish English, there is no distinction corresponding to the RP distinction between /æ/ and /ɑː/.

In Multicultural London English, /θ/ sometimes merges with /t/ but the preceding vowel remains unchanged. That leads to the homophony between bath and path on the one hand and Bart and part on the other. Both pairs are thus pronounced [ˈbɑːt] and [ˈpɑːt], respectively, which is not common in other non-rhotic accents of English that differentiate /ɑː/ from /æ/. That is not categorical, and th-fronting may occur instead and so bath and path can be [ˈbɑːf] and [ˈpɑːf] instead, as in Cockney.

=== In Received Pronunciation ===
In Received Pronunciation (RP), the trap–bath split did not happen in all eligible words. It is hard to find a clear rule for the ones that changed. Roughly, the more common a word, the more likely that its vowel changed from flat /æ/ to broad /ɑː/. It also looks as if monosyllables were more likely to change than polysyllables. The change very rarely took place in open syllables except if they were closely derived from another word with /ɑː/. Thus, for example, passing is closely derived from pass and so has broad A /ˈpɑːsɪŋ/, while passage is not so closely derived and so has flat A /ˈpæsɪd͡ʒ/.

Below are words in the BATH set, known by Edith Skinner (a proponent of the once-prestigious Transatlantic accent in Hollywood) as the "ASK list", as well as counterexamples with the same phonetic environment:

RP sets for the trap–bath split

Set	Flat /æ/	Broad /ɑː/
/-ðər/	blather, gather, slather	father, lather, rather
/-f/	Aphrodite, caff, carafe, chiffchaff, Daphne, gaff(e), graphic, mafia, scaffold(ing), staph	calf, giraffe, half, laugh, staff
/-ft/	kaftan, Taft	abaft, aft, after, craft, daft, draft/draught, graft, haft, kraft, laughter, raft, rafter, shaft
Word-final /-θ/	cath, hath, math(s), polymath, psychopath, sociopath, strath	bath, lath, path
Word-final /-s/	alas, ass, bagasse, bass (fish), crass, crevasse, cuirass, demitasse, en masse, frass, gas, harass, (Note: When not pronounced /ˈhærəs/.) kvass, lass, mass, morass, paillasse, sass, strass, trass, wrasse	brass, class, glass, grass, impasse, pass
/-sk/	Alaska, ascot, Asquith, casque, gasket, mascot, masculine, Nebraska	ask, bask, basket, cask, casket, flask, mask, masque, rascal, task
Word-final /-sp/	asp	clasp, gasp, grasp, hasp, rasp
Word-final /-st/	bast, bombast, clast, enthusiast, gymnast, hast, iconoclast, p(a)ederast, scholiast	aghast, avast, Belfast, blast, cast, caste, contrast, durmast, fast, flabbergast, gast, ghast, last, mast, past, repast, vast
Miscellaneous /-st/	Aston, astronaut, castigate, chastity, drastic, elastic, fantastic, pastel, pasta, pasty (type of pastry), plastic, raster	bastard, caster, castor, disaster, ghastly, master, nasty, pastime, pastor, pastoral, pasture, plaster
Word-final /-l/	all other words in this set	banal, chorale, corral, Internationale, locale, morale, musicale, pastorale, rale, rationale, royale
/-mpəl/	ample, trample	example, sample
/-nd/	all other words in this set	Alexander/Alexandra/Sanders/Sandra, chandler, command, countermand, demand, Flanders, remand, reprimand, slander
/-nt/	ant, antler, banter, cant, fantasy, mantle, pant(s), pedantic, phantom, rant, scant	advantage, aunt, can't, chant, Grant, grant, plant, shan't, slant, vantage
/-ntʃ/	franchise, revanchist, stanchion	avalanche, blanch, Blanche, branch, planchet, planchette, ranch, rancho, stanch, tranche
/-ns/	ancestor, ancillary, Anson, cancel, cancer, expanse, fancy, finance, handsome, rancid, ransom, romance	advance, answer, chance, chancel, chancellor, chancery, dance, enhance, France, Frances/Francis, glance, lance, lancet, prance, trance
Miscellaneous /-s/	ambassador, asinine, assassin, asset, basalt, classic(al), classify, hassle, lasso, massacre, massage, massive, passage, passive, tassel	castle, fasten
/-ʃ/	all other words in this set	m(o)ustache
Word-final /-v/	chav, have, lav, satnav	calve, halve, salve, (Note: When not pronounced /ˈsælv/.) Slav
/-z/	all other words in this set	raspberry

The split created a handful of minimal pairs, such as ant–aunt, caff–calf, cant–can't, have–halve, and staph-staff. There also are some near-minimal pairs, such as ample–sample. In accents with th-fronting (such as cockney), there are additional minimal pairs such as baff–bath and hath–half, and, in accents with th-stopping (which occurs variably in Multicultural London English), there are other minimal pairs such as bat–bath, lat–lath (with lat meaning latitude) and pat–path. In addition, h-dropping in Cockney creates more minimal pairs such as aff–half (with aff meaning affirmative) and asp–hasp.

There are some words in which both pronunciations are heard among southern speakers:

- the words Basque, chaff, dastard, Glasgow, graph, hanch, masquerade, pasteurise, (circum/happen)stance
- Greek elements as in blastocyst, chloroplast, telegraph
- words with the prefix trans-

While graph, telegraph, photograph can have either form (in Received Pronunciation, they now have broad A), graphic and permutations always have a flat A.

Broad A fluctuates in dialects that include it; before s it is a more common alternative when in its common voiceless variant (/s/ rather than /z/) (in transfer /tɹɑːnsˈfɜː/, transport /tɹɑːnˈspɔːt/ and variants) than when it is voiced (thus translate /tɹænzˈleɪt/, trans-Atlantic /ˌtɹænzətˈlæntɪk/).

=== Social attitudes ===
Some research has concluded that many people in Northern England dislike the /ɑː/ vowel in bath words. A.F. Gupta writes, 'Many of the northerners were noticeably hostile to /ɡrɑːs/, describing it as "comical", "snobbish", "pompous" or even "for morons"'. Writing on a Labovian study of speech in West Yorkshire, K. M. Petyt stated in 1985 that several respondents 'positively said that they did not prefer the long-vowel form or that they really detested it or even that it was incorrect'. However, Joan Beal said in a 1989 review of Petyt's work that those who disliked the pronunciation still associated it with the BBC and with the sort of professional positions to which they would aspire.

== Southern Hemisphere accents ==
Evidence for the date of the shift comes from the Southern Hemisphere accents in Australia, New Zealand, and South Africa.

In Australian English, there is generally agreement with Southern England in words like path, laugh, class. However, with the exception of South Australian English and in the specific words aunt, can't, shan't in all Australian English, other words with the vowel appearing before /n/ or /m/, such as dance, plant, example, can use the flat A. In Australia, there is variation in words like castle and graph; for more information, see the table at Variation in Australian English. In South Australian English, the broad A is usually used. Phonetically, the Australian broad A is [äː].

South African English and New Zealand English have a sound distribution similar to that of Received Pronunciation; however, the flat A in these accents is [ɛ].

== North American accents ==
Most accents of American English and Canadian English are unaffected by the split. The main exceptions are in extinct or older accents of eastern New England (including the early-20th-century Boston accent) and possibly the Plantation South, particularly Tidewater Virginia, where the broad sound was used in some of the same words, though usually a smaller number, as in Southern England, such as aunt, ask, bath. (Aunt alone still commonly uses the palm vowel in New England and Virginia.) By the early 1980s, the broad /a/ was in decline in New England.

Related but distinct phenomena include the following:

- The phonemic tensing of /æ/ in the accents of New York English and particularly Philadelphia that occurs specifically before [f, s, θ, n, m] (in New York, tensing occurs in more environments; see /æ/ tensing).
- The drawled pronunciation /æ/ → [æə] in Southern accents; many South Midland, Appalachian English, and inland Southern speakers also raise the /æ/ in aunt, dance, plant to [ɛ] or [e].

In North American English, the non-front realization of continental ⟨a⟩ in loanwords such as pasta /ˈpɑstə/ (vs. British /ˈpæstə/) is not an example of the trap-bath split because the vast majority of North American English accents do not feature the split in native words. Furthermore, the /ɑ/ realization occurs regardless of the phonetic environment, even in those environments where the lengthening did not take place in the south of England, such as before a bare final /n/ in the German surname Mann /ˈmɑn/ (cf. British /ˈmæn/, homophonous with the native word man).
