= Edith Skinner =

Canadian vocal coach (1902–1981)

- Born: Edith Warman; September 22, 1902; Moncton, New Brunswick, Canada
- Died: July 25, 1981 (aged 78); Milwaukee, Wisconsin, U.S.
- Education: Leland Powers School for the Spoken Word
- Alma mater: Columbia University (BA, MA)
- Occupations: Vocal coach, consultant
- Employer: Carnegie Mellon University (1937–1974)
- Known for: Speak with Distinction
- Notable work: Speak with Distinction (1942)

Edith Skinner (née Warman; 22 September 1902 – 25 July 1981) was a Canadian-born vocal coach and a consultant to actors. Her book, Speak With Distinction, has been reprinted several times, promoting actors' use of what she called Good American Speech, an accent for the stage, largely inspired by Northeastern elite accents. She has become known for her vigorous advocacy of the briefly fashionable accent.

== Life ==
Skinner was born Edith Agnes Warman in Moncton, New Brunswick, in eastern Canada, on 22 September 1902, to Herbert Havelock Warman and his wife Agnes Lynn, née Orr. She attended the Leland Powers School for the Spoken Word in Boston, Massachusetts, and graduated in 1923. There she met Margaret Prendergast McLean, and through her, McLean's mentor William Tilly, a speech instructor who taught a phonetically consistent accent for educated people intended to transcend national and socioeconomic boundaries. Edith Warman became Tilly's assistant in 1926, sometime after which she changed her surname to Skinner. She studied at Columbia University, where she obtained a bachelor's degree in 1930 and a master's in 1931.

From 1937 to 1974, Skinner was on the faculty of the Carnegie Institute of Technology (later Carnegie-Mellon University) in Pittsburgh. She also taught at the Juilliard School in New York, the American Conservatory Theater in San Francisco, and at the University of Wisconsin.

She died in Milwaukee on 25 July 1981.

== Writings ==
Skinner wrote Speak with Distinction: Exercises, which was published in 1942 and has been reprinted several times. Collections of her papers are held by the New York Public Library in New York City, and by the University of Pittsburgh.
