= New York accent =

Sound system of New York City English

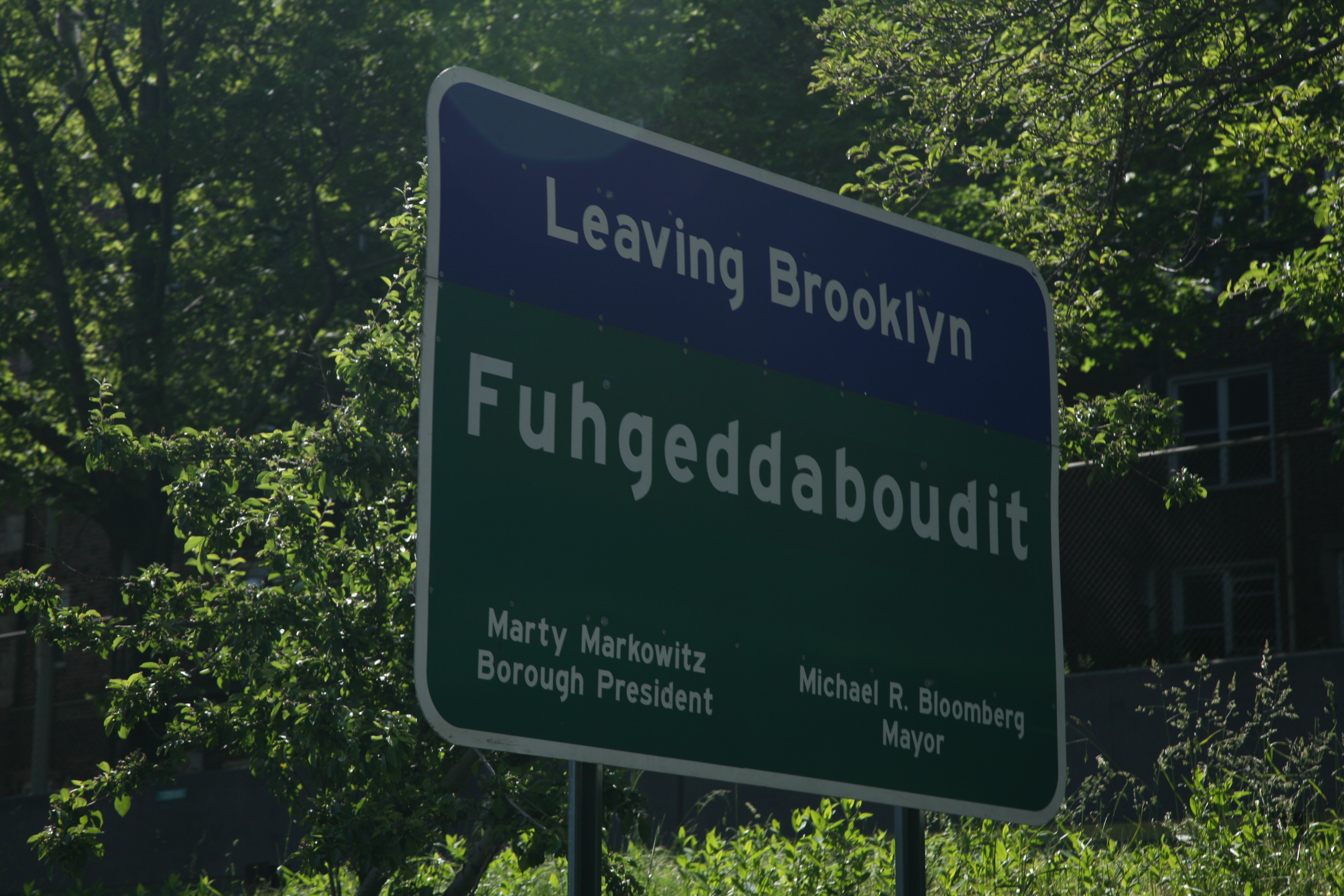
A sign on the periphery of Brooklyn in 2008, that reads "Fuhgeddaboudit" (a pronunciation spelling of "forget about it"), illustrating the "Brooklyn accent"'s non-rhoticity and t-voicing

Speech example
An example of a mostly non-rhotic male speaker with a background in the Bronx and the city of New Rochelle (Chuck Zito)

Speech example
An example of a mostly rhotic male speaker from Brooklyn (James S. Shapiro)

Speech example
An example of a mostly rhotic male speaker from Queens (Art Spiegelman)

The sound system of New York City English is popularly known as a New York accent. The accent of the New York metropolitan area is one of the most recognizable in the United States, largely due to its popular stereotypes and portrayal in radio, film, and television. Several other common names exist based on more specific locations, such as Bronx accent, Brooklyn accent, Queens accent, Long Island accent, and North Jersey accent. Research supports the continued classification of all of these under a single label, despite some common assumptions among locals that they meaningfully differ. Accents elsewhere in New York State largely fall under the separate classification of Inland Northern U.S. accents.

The following is an overview of the phonological structures and variations within the accent.

== Vowels ==
Pure vowels (Monophthongs)
English diaphoneme	New York City realization	Example words
/æ/	[æ]	act, pal, trap
/æ/	[ɛə~eə~ɪə]	bath, mad, pass
/ɑː/	[ɑ~ɑ̈~ɒ(ə)]	blah, father
/ɒ/	[ɑ~ɑ̈]	bother, lot, wasp
/ɔː/	[ɔə~oə~ʊə]	dog, loss, cloth
/ɔː/	[ɔə~oə~ʊə]	all, bought, saw
/ɛ/	[ɛ]	dress, met, bread
/ə/	[ə]	about, syrup, arena
/ɪ/	[ɪ~ɪ̈]	hit, skim, tip
/iː/	[i~ɪi]	beam, chic, fleet
/ʌ/	[ʌ̈]	bus, flood, month
/ʊ/	[ʊ]	book, put, should
/uː/	[u] or [ʊu~ɤʊ~ɤu]	food, glue, new
Diphthongs
/aɪ/	[ɑɪ~ɒɪ~äɪ]	ride, shine, try
/aɪ/	[äɪ]	bright, dice, pike
/aʊ/	[a̝ʊ~æʊ]	now, ouch, scout
/eɪ/	[eɪ~ɛɪ]	lake, paid, rein
/ɔɪ/	[ɔɪ~oɪ]	boy, choice, moist
/oʊ/	[ɔʊ~ʌʊ]	goat, oh, show
Vowels followed by /r/
/ɑːr/	[ɒə] (rhotic: [ɒɹ~ɑɹ]; older: [ɑ̈ə])	barn, car, park
/ɪər/	[ɪə~iə] (rhotic: [ɪɹ~iɹ])	fear, peer, tier
/ɛər/	[ɛə~eə] (rhotic: [ɛɹ~eɹ])	bare, bear, there
/ɜːr/	[ɜɹ] (older: [əɪ])	burn, first, herd
/ɜːr/	[ɜɹ] or [ʌ(ː)~ʌə]	her, were, stir
/ər/	[ə] (rhotic: [ɚ])	doctor, martyr, pervade
/ɔː/	[ɔə~oɐ] (rhotic: [ɔɹ~oɹ])	hoarse, horse, door score, tour, war
/ʊər/	[ɔə~oɐ] (rhotic: [ɔɹ~oɹ])	hoarse, horse, door score, tour, war
/jʊər/	[juə~juɐ] (rhotic: [juɹ])	cure, Europe, pure

- Cot–caught distinction: The /ɔ/ vowel sound (in words like talk, law, cross, and coffee) and the often homophonous /ɔr/ in core and more are tensed and usually raised more than in General American, varying on a scale from [ɔ] to [ʊ] while typically accompanied by an inglide that produces variants like [oə] or [ʊə]. These sounds are kept strongly distinct from the /ɑ/ in words like lot, dot, bot, and hot; therefore, caught is something like [kʰoət], and cot is something like [kʰɑ̈t].
- Father–bother variability: Linguistically conservative speakers retain three separate low back vowels: LOT [ɑ], PALM [ɒ(ə)], and THOUGHT [oə], thus with words like father and bother not rhyming as they do for most other Americans. Among such conservative speakers, descendants of Middle English short o with certain or, perhaps, any and all final voiced consonants (e.g., cob, cod, cog, lodge, bomb) normally take on the rounded PALM sound; Labov et al. report that which words fall into the LOT class and which words fall into the PALM class may vary from speaker to speaker. Aside from such speakers with this relic feature, however, a majority of Metro New Yorkers today exhibit a father–bother merger.
- Short-a split system: New York City English uses a complicated short-a split system in which all words with the "short a" can be split into two separate classes on the basis of the sound of the vowel; thus, in New York City, words like badge, class, lag, mad, and pan, for example, are pronounced with an entirely different vowel sound than are words like bat, clang, lack, map, and patch. In the former set of words, historical /æ/ is raised and tensed to an ingliding diphthong of the type [ɛə~eə] or even [ɪə]. Meanwhile, the latter set of words retains a more typical lax and low-front [æ] sound. A strongly related (but slightly different) split occurs likewise in Philadelphia and Baltimore accents.
  /æ/ raising in North American English
  Following consonant	Example words	New York City, New Orleans	Baltimore, Philadelphia	Midland US, New England, Pittsburgh, Western US	Canada, Northern Mountain US	Minnesota, Wisconsin	Southern US	Great Lakes US
  Non-prevocalic /m, n/	fan, lamb, stand	[ɛə] (Note: In New York City and Philadelphia, most function words (am, can, had, etc.) and some learned or less common words (alas, carafe, lad, etc.) have [æ].) (Note: In Philadelphia, the irregular verbs began, ran, and swam have [æ].)		[ɛə]	[ɛə]		[ɛə~ɛjə]	[ɛə]
  Prevocalic /m, n/	animal, planet, Spanish	[æ]		[ɛə]	[ɛə]		[ɛə~ɛjə]	[ɛə]
  /ŋ/	frank, language	[æ]		[ɛː~eɪ~æ]	[ɛː~ɛj]	[eː~ej]	[æ~æɛə]	[ɛə]
  Prevocalic /ɡ/	dragon, magazine	[æ]		[æ] (Note: The untensed /æ/ may be lowered and retracted as much as [ä] in varieties affected by the Low-Back-Merger Shift, mainly predominant in Canada and the American West.)	[ɛː~ɛj]	[eː~ej]	[æ~æɛə]	[ɛə]
  Non-prevocalic /ɡ/	bag, drag	[ɛə]	[æ] (Note: In Philadelphia, bad, mad, and glad alone in this context have [ɛə].)	[æ]	[ɛː~ɛj]	[eː~ej]	[æ~æɛə]	[ɛə]
  Non-prevocalic /b, d, ʃ/	grab, flash, sad	[ɛə]	[æ]	[æ]	[æ]	[ɛə]	[æ~æɛə]	[ɛə]
  Non-prevocalic /f, θ, s/	ask, bath, half, glass	[ɛə]		[æ]	[æ]	[ɛə]	[æ~æɛə]	[ɛə]
  Otherwise	as, back, happy, locality	[æ] (Note: In New York City, certain lexical exceptions exist (like avenue being tense) and variability is common before /dʒ/ and /z/ as in imagine, magic, and jazz. In New Orleans, [ɛə] additionally occurs before /v/ and /z/.)		[æ]	[æ]	[ɛə]	[æ~æɛə]	[ɛə]
- Conservative /oʊ/ and /u/: /oʊ/ as in goat usually does not undergo fronting; instead, it remains [oʊ] and may even have a lowered starting point. Relatedly, /u/ as in GOOSE is not fronted and remains a back vowel [u] or [ʊu], although it may be more fronted following a coronal consonant, such as in loose, too, and zoom. This general lack of fronting of /oʊ/ and /u/ also distinguishes New York City from nearby Philadelphia. Some speakers have a separate phoneme /ɪu/ in words such as tune, news, and duke (historically a separate class). The phonemic status of this vowel is marginal. For example, Labov (1966) reported that certain Metro New Yorkers regularly contrasted [du] do with [dɪu] dew but that certain others used the pronunciation [dɪu] for both do and dew. Also, Labov et al. in 2006 reported that yod-dropping had diffused as a characteristic among the rest of New York City English's speakers (in which the vowel in dew and do is pronounced very far back in the mouth).
- Backed /aɪ/ and fronted /aʊ/: The nucleus of the /aɪ/ diphthong is traditionally a back and sometimes rounded vowel [ɑ̈~ɑ] or [ɒ] (mean value [ɑ̟]) (ride as [ɹɑɪd]), while the nucleus of the /aʊ/ diphthong is a front vowel [æ~a] (the mean value is open front [a]) (out as [æʊt~aʊt]). The sociolinguistic evidence suggests that both of these developments are active changes. The fronted nucleus in /aʊ/ and the backed nucleus in /aɪ/ are most common among younger speakers, women, and the working and lower middle classes.
- Pre-/r/ distinctions: New York accents lack most of the mergers that occur with vowels before an /r/, which are otherwise common in other varieties of North American English. There is typically a three-way Mary–marry–merry distinction, in which the vowels in words like marry [ˈmæɹi], merry [ˈmɛɹi], and Mary [ˈmeɹi] ~ [ˈmɛəɹi] do not merge. The vowels in furry [ˈfɝi] and hurry [ˈhʌɹi] are commonly distinct. Also, words like orange, horrible, Florida and forest are pronounced with /ɒ/ or /ɑ/, the same stressed vowel as part, not with the same vowel as port as in much of the rest of the United States.
  Distribution of /ɒr/ and prevocalic /ɔːr/ by dialect
  	British RP	General American	Traditional American (Note: This here refers to accents of greater New York City, greater Philadelphia, the older Southern U.S., and the older Northeastern elite. It also includes some speakers, though particularly older ones, in Eastern New England (predominantly Rhode Island) and coastal states of the modern Southern U.S.)	Canada
  Only borrow, sorrow, sorry, (to)morrow	/ɒr/	/ɑːr/	/ɒr/ or /ɑːr/	/ɔːr/
  Forest, Florida, historic, moral, porridge, etc.	/ɒr/	/ɔːr/	/ɒr/ or /ɑːr/	/ɔːr/
  Forum, memorial, oral, storage, story, etc.	/ɔːr/	/ɔːr/	/ɔːr/	/ɔːr/
- Back vowel chain shift before /r/: /ɔr/, as in Tory, bore, or shore merges with a tongue movement upward in the mouth to /ʊər/, as in tour, boor, or sure. This is followed by the possibility of /ɑr/, as in tarry or bar, also moving upward (with rounding) towards /ɒr/~/ɔr/. In non-rhotic New York City speech, this means that born can be [bʊən] and barn can be [bɒən]. This shift also applies to instances of /ɔ/ not before /r/, so caught can be [kʊət]. However, unlike the firmness of this shift in Philadelphia English, the entire process is still transitioning and variable in New York City English and may be stigmatized and reversing among some younger speakers.
- Up-gliding NURSE: Among the various stereotypes of New York City speech is the use of a front-rising diphthong in words with /ɜːr/, or the NURSE vowel. This stereotype is popularly represented in stock phrases like "toity-toid" for thirty-third. The phonetic reality of this variant is actually unrounded [əɪ], thus making [ˌt̪əɪɾi ˈt̪əɪd] the true pronunciation of the popular phrase. The unrounded [əɪ] sound has also been used for the vowel /ɔɪ/ sometimes. As a variant of /ɜːr/, however, it may only occur when followed by a consonant within the same morpheme, so, for example, stir may be [stʌ(ː)~stʌə] but never [stəɪ]. William Labov's data published in 1966 indicate that this highly stigmatized diphthongal form of /ɜːr/ was recessive even then. Only two of Labov's 51 speakers under age 20 used the form, in contrast to his speakers age 50 and over, of whom 23 out of 30 used the non-rhotic form. Younger Metro New Yorkers (born since about 1950) are consequently likely to use the rhotic [ɝ] sound (as in General American) for the diaphoneme /ɜːr/ when preconsonantal (as in bird), even if they use non-rhotic pronunciations of beard, bared, bard, board, boor, buttered, or even burred ([bʌ(ː)d~bʌəd]). Still, Labov considers that the stigmatized variant "lingers on in a modified form." In other words, Labov believes that the rhotic [ɝ] of many Metro New Yorkers today remains slightly raised compared to that of other Americans. In addition, despite the near-extinction of the diphthongal, up-gliding NURSE variant, Michael Newman in 2014 found [əɪ] variably in two of his research participants, one born as late as the early 1990s. Related to the non-rhotic variant as used for /ɔɪ/, a form of intrusive R has as well been reported in CHOICE words whereby /ɔɪ/ might occur with r-coloring in the same fashion as /ɜːr/ (e.g., [ˈt̪ʰɝɫɨt] toilet, [ɝɫ] oil), apparently as a result of hypercorrection.

== Consonants ==
While the following consonantal features are central to the common stereotype of a "New York City accent", they are not entirely ubiquitous in New York City. By contrast, the vocalic (vowel) variations in pronunciation as described above are far more typical of New York City–area speakers than the consonantal features listed below, which carry a much greater stigma than do the dialect's vocalic variations:

- Pronunciation of /r/: The consonant /r/, when pronounced, is usually postalveolar [ɹ̠] and is often strongly labialized [ɹ̠ʷ] in New York City English, particularly when it appears as the first consonant in a syllable.

Intrusive R in NYC examples
Examples of intrusive R in the speech of a male speaker from Brooklyn (Dr. Anthony Fauci).

  - Non-rhoticity (or r-lessness): The traditional metropolitan New York accent is non-rhotic; in other words, the sound [ɹ] does not appear at the end of a syllable or immediately before a consonant. Thus, there is no [ɹ] in words like here [hɪə], butter [ˈbʌɾə], layer [ˈɫeɪ.ə], or park [pʰɒək] (with the vowel rounded due to the low-back chain shift, though [pʰɑ̈ək] for earlier twentieth-century speakers). However, modern New York City English is variably rhotic for the most part; in fact, the New York accent can vary between pronounced and silenced [ɹ] in similar phonetic environments, even in the same word when repeated. Also, while a significant number drop r-coloring from the schwa /ə/ and most other vowels at least some of the time, as in butter, most current speakers retain r-coloring in the sequence /ɜːr/ (e.g., worker [ˈwɝkə]), as detailed in the previous section. Non-rhotic speakers usually exhibit a linking R and frequently an intrusive R as well, like speakers of most other non-rhotic dialects.
  - Rhoticity (or r-fulness): In more modern times, the post-vocalic /r/ has become more prominent, with many current New York City speakers using rhoticity to at least some degree. When Metro New Yorkers are more conscious of what they are saying, the /r/ typically becomes more evident in their speech. In terms of social stratification, the lower class of New York City tends to use rhoticity less than the middle and upper classes. Also, rhoticity is noticeably based on age since younger generations are more likely to pronounce /r/ in coda position.
- Laminal alveolar consonants: The alveolar consonants /t/, /d/, /n/, and /l/ may be articulated with the tongue blade rather than the tip. Wells (1982) indicates that this articulation may, in some cases, also involve affrication, producing [tˢ] and [dᶻ]. Also, /t/ and /d/ are often pronounced with the tongue touching the teeth instead of the alveolar ridge (just above the teeth) as is typical in most varieties of English. Such an articulation may be used in the cluster /tr/, producing possible homophones such as three and tree [t̪ɹ̊i], and may even appear intervocalically, including when /t/ or /d/ is pronounced as a tap [ɾ], according to a report from the mid–twentieth century. As in other American dialects, /t/ may be elided or glottalized following /n/ in words like painting [ˈpʰeɪnɪŋ] and fountain [ˈfaʊnʔn̩]; glottalization, in particular, is reported to sometimes appear in a wider range of contexts in New York City speech than in other American dialects, appearing, for example, before syllabic /l/ (e.g., bottle [ˈbɑ̈ʔɫ̩]). At the same time, before a pause, a released final stop is often more common than a glottal stop in New York City accents than in General American ones; for example, bat as [bæt̪] rather than [bæʔ].
  - The universal usage of "dark L", [ɫ], common throughout the U.S., is also typical of the New York City accent. Newman (2014) reports /l/ even in initial position to be relatively dark for all accents of the city except the accents of Latinos. However, in the mid–twentieth century, both dark and "not quite so 'dark'" variants of /l/ were reported. The latter occurred initially or in initial consonant clusters and was pronounced with the point or blade of the tongue against the alveolar ridge, though this variant was not as "clear" as in British Received Pronunciation.
  - Also, /l/ is reported as commonly becoming postalveolar before /j/, making a word like William for some speakers [ˈwɪʎjɨm] or even [ˈwɪjɨm].
  - Vocalization of /l/: L-vocalization is common in New York City though it is perhaps not as pervasive as in some other dialects. Like its fellow liquid /r/, it may be vocalized when it appears finally or before a consonant (e.g., [sɛo] sell, [mɪok] milk).
- Th-stopping: As in many other dialects, the interdental fricatives /θ/ and /ð/ are often realized as dental or alveolar stop consonants, famously like [t] and [d], or affricates [tθ] and [dð]. Labov (1966) found this alternation to vary by class, with the non-fricative forms appearing more regularly in lower- and working-class speech. Unlike the reported changes with /r/, the variation with /θ/ and /ð/ appears to be stable. Historical dialect documents suggest th-stopping probably originated from the massive influence of German, Italian, Irish, and Yiddish speakers who immigrated to the city starting in the mid–nineteenth century.
- Pronunciation of ⟨ng⟩: Some speakers might replace /ŋ/ with the sequence /ŋg/ categorically or at least use [ŋg] as an optional variant of /ŋ/, as stereotyped in the pronunciation spelling "Lawn Guyland" for "Long Island" ([ɫɔəŋˈɡɑɪɫənd] rather than the more General American [ɫɔŋˈäɪɫənd]). This pronunciation occurs most strongly among Lubavitcher Jews but has also, at least in the past, been used in the speech of Italians, and it has become a stereotype of the New York City accent in general. Speakers with and without this feature may realize /ŋ/ as [n] in unstressed -ing endings.
- Reduction of /hj/ to /j/: Metro New Yorkers typically do not allow /h/ to precede /j/; this gives pronunciations like yuman /ˈjumən/ and yooge /judʒ/ for human and huge.

== Variability ==
=== Social and geographic variation ===
Despite common references to a "Bronx accent", "Brooklyn accent", "Long Island accent", etc., which reflect a popular belief that different boroughs or neighborhoods of the New York metropolitan area have different accents, linguistic research fails to reveal any features that vary internally within the dialect due to specific geographic differences. Impressions that the dialect varies geographically are likely a byproduct of class or ethnic variation, and even some of these assumptions are losing credibility in light of accent convergences among the current younger generations of various ethnic backgrounds. Speakers from Queens born in the 1990s and later are showing a cot–caught merger more than in other boroughs, though this too is likely class- or ethnic-based (or perhaps even part of a larger trend spanning the whole city) rather than location-based. The increasing extent of the cot–caught merger among these Queens natives has also appeared to be correlated with their majority foreign parentage. A lowering of New York City's traditionally raised caught vowel is similarly taking place among younger residents of Manhattan's Lower East Side. This is seen most intensely among Western European (and Jewish) New Yorkers, fairly intensely among Latino and Asian New Yorkers, but not among African-American New Yorkers. Therefore, this reverses the trend that was documented among Western European Lower East Siders in the twentieth century.

==== In New Jersey ====
Though geographic differences are not a primary factor in the internal variation of features within the dialect, the prevalence of the dialect's features as a whole does vary within the metropolitan area based on distance from the city proper, notably in northeastern New Jersey. East of the Passaic and Hackensack Rivers (closest to the city proper) and in Newark, the short-a split system is identical to that used in the city itself. West of the Hackensack but east of the Passaic, the New York City system's function word constraint is lost before nasal codas, and the open syllable constraint begins to vary in usage. West of both rivers (farthest from the city proper), a completely different short-a system is found. Furthermore, New York City's closest New Jersey neighbors, like Newark and Jersey City, may be non-rhotic like the city itself. Outside of these cities, however, the New York metropolitan speech of New Jersey is nowadays fully rhotic, so the phrase "over there" might be pronounced "ovah deah" [ɔʊvə ˈd̪ɛə] by a native of Newark but "over dare" [ɔʊvɚ ˈd̪ɛɚ] by a native of Elizabeth.

=== Ethnic variation ===
The classic New York City dialect is centered on middle- and working-class European Americans, and this ethnic cluster now accounts for less than half of the city's population, within which there are degrees of ethnic variation. The variations of New York City English are a result of the waves of immigrants that have settled in the city, from the earliest settlement by the Dutch and English followed in the nineteenth century by the Irish and Western Europeans (typically of French, German, and Scandinavian descent) settling. Over time, these collective influences combined to give New York City its distinctive traditional accent; William Labov argued that Irish New Yorkers, in particular, contributed the accent's most stigmatized features.

The many Eastern European Jewish and Italian immigrants who came, for the most part, until the immigration acts of 1921 and 1924 restricted Southern and Eastern European immigration further influenced the city's speech. Ongoing sociolinguistic research suggests that some differentiation between these last groups' speech may exist. For example, Labov found that Jewish-American New Yorkers were more likely than other groups to use the closest variants of /ɔ/ (meaning towards [ʊə]) and perhaps fully released final stops (for example, pronunciation of sent as [sɛnt] rather than the more General American [sɛnt̚] or [sɛnʔ]), while Italian-American New Yorkers were more likely than other groups to use the closest variants of /æ/ (meaning towards [ɪə]). Still, Labov argues that these differences are relatively minor, more of degree than kind. All noted Euro-American groups share the relevant features.

One area revealing robustly unique patterns is New York City English among Orthodox Jews, overlapping with Yeshiva English, which can also exist outside of the New York City metropolitan area. Such patterns include certain Yiddish grammatical contact features, such as topicalizations of direct objects (e.g., constructions such as Esther, she saw! or A dozen knishes, you bought!), and the general replacement of /ŋ/ with /ŋɡ/. There is also substantial use of Yiddish and particularly Hebrew words.

African-American New Yorkers typically speak a New York variant of African-American Vernacular English (AAVE) that shares the New York accent's raised /ɔ/ vowel. Many Latino New Yorkers speak a distinctly local ethnolect, New York Latino English, characterized by a varying mix of New York City English and AAVE features, along with some Spanish contact features. Euro-American New Yorkers alone, particularly Anglo-Americans, have been traditionally documented as using a phonetic split of /aɪ/ as follows: [äɪ] before voiceless consonants but [ɑːɪ] elsewhere. Asian-American New Yorkers are not shown by studies to have any phonetic features that are overwhelmingly distinct.

== Bibliography ==
- Baker, Adam; Mielke, Jeff; Archangeli, Diana (2008). "More velar than /g/: Consonant Coarticulation as a Cause of Diphthongization" (PDF). In Chang, Charles B.; Haynie, Hannah J. (eds.). Proceedings of the 26th West Coast Conference on Formal Linguistics. Somerville, Massachusetts: Cascadilla Proceedings Project. pp. 60–68. ISBN 978-1-57473-423-2.
- Boberg, Charles (2008). "Regional phonetic differentiation in Standard Canadian English". Journal of English Linguistics. 36 (2): 129–154. doi:10.1177/0075424208316648. S2CID 146478485.
- Duncan, Daniel (2016). "'Tense' /æ/ is still lax: A phonotactics study" (PDF). In Hansson, Gunnar Ólafur; Farris-Trimble, Ashley; McMullin, Kevin; Pulleyblank, Douglas (eds.). Supplemental Proceedings of the 2015 Annual Meeting on Phonology. Vol. 3. Washington, D.C.: Linguistic Society of America. doi:10.3765/amp.v3i0.3653.
- Gordon, Matthew (2004). "New York, Philadelphia and other Northern Cities: phonology". In Schneider, Edgar W. (ed.). A Handbook of Varieties of English. Mouton de Gruyter. doi:10.1515/9783110197181. ISBN 9783110208405.
- Labov, William (2006) [1966], The Social Stratification of English in New York City (PDF) (2nd ed.), Cambridge: Cambridge University Press, archived from the original (PDF) on August 24, 2014
- Labov, William (2007). "Transmission and Diffusion" (PDF). Language. 83 (2): 344–387. doi:10.1353/lan.2007.0082. JSTOR 40070845. S2CID 6255506.
- Labov, William; Ash, Sharon; Boberg, Charles (2006). The Atlas of North American English. Berlin: Mouton de Gruyter. ISBN 3-11-016746-8.
- Wells, John C. (1982), Accents of English, Vol. 3: Beyond the British Isles (pp. i–xx, 467–674), Cambridge University Press, doi:10.1017/CBO9780511611766, ISBN 0-52128541-0
