= Linking and intrusive R =

Situational pronunciation of /r/ in non-rhotic varieties of English

Linking R and intrusive R are sandhi phenomena wherein a rhotic consonant is pronounced between two consecutive vowels with the purpose of avoiding a hiatus, that would otherwise occur in the expressions, such as tuner amp, although in isolation tuner is pronounced the same as tuna /ˈt(j)uːnə/ in non-rhotic varieties of English. These phenomena occur in many of said non-rhotic dialects, such as those in most of England and Wales, parts of the United States, and all of the Anglophone societies of the southern hemisphere, with the exception of South Africa. In these varieties, /r/ is pronounced only when it is immediately followed by a vowel.

Linking R and intrusive R may also occur between a root morpheme and certain suffixes, such as -ing or -al. For instance, in words such as draw(r)ing, withdraw(r)al, or Kafka(r)esque.

These phenomena first appeared in English sometime after the year 1700.

== Non-rhotic varieties ==
By definition, non-rhotic varieties of English pronounce /r/ only when it immediately precedes a vowel. This is called r-vocalisation, r-loss, r-deletion, r-dropping, r-lessness, or non-rhoticity.

For example, even though the word tuner is spelled with an ⟨r⟩ (which reflects that an /r/ was pronounced in the past), non-rhotic accents do not pronounce an /r/ when there is no vowel sound to follow it. In contrast, speakers of rhotic dialects, such as those of Scotland, Ireland, and most of North America (except in some of the Northeastern United States and Southern United States), always pronounce an /r/ in tuner and never in tuna so that the two always sound distinct, even when pronounced in isolation. Hints of non-rhoticity go back as early as the 15th century, and the feature was common (at least in London) by the early 18th century.

== Linking R ==
In many non-rhotic accents, words historically ending in /r/ (as evidenced by an ⟨r⟩ in the spelling) may be pronounced with /r/ when they are closely followed by another morpheme beginning with a vowel sound. So tuner amp may be pronounced [ˈtjuːnəɹ æmp]. (Note: It is arguable whether or not the /r/ is phonetically part of the onset of the following word (a form of liaison) Gick (1999:31). Vennemann (1972:216), for example, argues that linking R is an instance of resyllabifying the rhotic phoneme. On the other hand, Wells would argue that it is not necessarily in the onset of the following syllable.) This is the case in such accents even though tuner would not otherwise be pronounced with an /r/. Here, "closely" means the following word must be in the same prosodic unit (that is, not separated by a pausa). This phenomenon is known as linking R. Not all non-rhotic accents feature linking R. South African English, African-American Vernacular English and non-rhotic varieties of Southern American English are notable for not using a linking R.

== Intrusive R ==
Intrusive R (in NYC)
Examples of intrusive R in the speech of a New York City English speaker (Dr. Anthony Fauci)

The phenomenon of intrusive R is a reinterpretation of linking R into an r-insertion rule that affects any word that ends in the non-high vowels /ə/, /ɪə/, /ɑː/, or /ɔː/; when such a word is closely followed by another word beginning in a vowel sound, an /r/ is inserted between them, even when no final /r/ was historically present. For example, the phrase bacteria in it would be pronounced /bækˈtɪəriərˌɪnɪt/. The epenthetic /r/ can be inserted to prevent hiatus (two consecutive vowel sounds).

In extreme cases, an intrusive R can follow a reduced schwa, such as in the example if you hafta[r], I’ll help and in the following examples taken from the native speech of English speakers from Eastern Massachusetts: I’m gonna[r]ask Adrian, t[ər]add to his troubles, a lotta[r]apples and the[r]apples. A related phenomenon involves the dropping of a consonant at the juncture of two words and the insertion of an r in its place. Sometimes this occurs in conjunction with the reduction of the final vowel in the first word to a schwa: examples of this are He shoulda[r]eaten.

Other recognizable examples are the Beatles singing: "I saw-r-a film today, oh boy" in the song "A Day in the Life", from their 1967 album Sgt. Pepper's Lonely Hearts Club Band; in the song "Champagne Supernova" by Oasis: "supernova-r-in the sky"; in the song "Scenes from an Italian Restaurant" by Billy Joel: "Brenda-r-and Eddie"; in the phrases, "law-r-and order" and "Victoria-r-and Albert Museum", and even in the name "Maya-r-Angelou". This is now common enough in parts of England that, by 1997, the linguist John C. Wells considered it objectively part of Received Pronunciation, though he noted that "the speech conscious often dislike it and disapprove of it". It is or was stigmatised as an incorrect pronunciation in some other standardized non-rhotic accents, too. Wells writes that at least in RP, "linking /r/ and intrusive /r/ are distinct only historically and orthographically".

Just as with linking R, intrusive R may also occur between a root morpheme and certain suffixes, such as draw(r)ing, withdraw(r)al, or Kafka(r)esque.

Some varieties may feature linking R without intrusive R, maintaining a phonemic distinction between words with and without syllable-final /r/.

Margaret Thatcher was nicknamed "Laura Norder" because of her references during her period of office to "law and order" with an intrusive /r/.

== Prevalence ==
A 2006 study at the University of Bergen examined the pronunciation of 30 British newsreaders on nationally broadcast newscasts around the turn of the 21st century speaking what was judged to be "mainstream RP". The data used in the study consisted mostly of the newsreaders reading from prepared scripts, but also included some more informal interview segments. It was found that all the newsreaders used some linking R and 90% (27 of 30) used some intrusive R.

Overall, linking R was used in 59.8% of possible sites and intrusive R was used in 32.6% of possible sites. The factors influencing the use of both linking and intrusive R were found to be the same. Factors favouring the use of R-sandhi included adjacency to short words, adjacency to grammatical or otherwise non-lexical words, and informal style (interview rather than prepared script). Factors disfavouring the use of R-sandhi included adjacency to proper names; occurrence immediately before a stressed syllable; the presence of another /r/ in the vicinity; and more formal style (prepared script rather than interview). The following factors were proposed as accounting for the difference between the frequency of linking and intrusive R:

- overt stigmatization of intrusive R
- the speakers being professional newsreaders and thus, presumably, speech-conscious professionals
- the speakers (in most cases) reading from a written script, making the orthographic distinction between linking and intrusive R extremely salient
- the disparity between the large number of short grammatical words that end in possible linking R (e.g. "for", "or", "are", etc.) and the absence of such words that end in possible intrusive R.

== See also ==
- Diaeresis (diacritic)
- Hiatus (linguistics)
- Pausa
- Liaison (French)
- Sandhi
- R-colored vowel
- Movable nu

== Bibliography ==
- Gick, Bryan (1999). "A gesture-based account of intrusive consonants in English" (PDF). Phonology. 16 (1): 29–54. doi:10.1017/s0952675799003693. S2CID 61173209. Archived from the original (PDF) on 2013-04-12.
- Gimson, A.C. (1962). An Introduction to the Pronunciation of English. London: Edward Arnold.
- Hartmann, D.; Zerbian, S. (2009). "Rhoticity in Black South African English – A sociolinguistic study". Southern African Linguistics and Applied Language Studies. 27 (2): 135–148. doi:10.2989/salals.2009.27.2.2.865. S2CID 143375531.
- Hock, Hans Henrich (2009). Language History, Language Change, and Language Relationship: An Introduction to Historical and Comparative Linguistics. Mouton de Gruyter. ISBN 978-3-11-021842-8.
- Jones, Daniel (1966). The Pronunciation of English (4th ed.). Cambridge: Cambridge University Press.
- Kurath, H. (1964). A Phonology and Prosody of Modern English. Heidelberg: Carl Winter.
- Peters, Robert (1996). "Early Modern English consonants". Journal of English Linguistics. 24: 45–51. doi:10.1177/007542429602400104. S2CID 144814014.
- Trudgill, Peter; Gordon, Elizabeth (2006). "Predicting the past: Dialect archaeology and Australian English rhoticity". English World-Wide. 27 (3): 235–246. doi:10.1075/eww.27.3.02tru.
- Vennemann, T. (1972). "Rule inversion". Lingua. 29: 209–242. doi:10.1016/0024-3841(72)90025-3.
- Wells, J.C. (1970), "Local accents in England and Wales", Journal of Linguistics, 6 (2): 231–252, doi:10.1017/S0022226700002632, S2CID 143523909
- Wells, J.C. (1982). Accents of English 1: An Introduction. Cambridge University Press. ISBN 0-521-29719-2.
