= English language in England =

English English
- Anglo-English
- English
- Native to: United Kingdom
- Region: England
- Ethnicity: English people
- Language family: Indo-European: Germanic; West Germanic; North Sea Germanic; Anglo-Frisian; Anglic; English; English English
- Early form: Proto-English
- Dialects: Northern English; West Midlands English; East Midlands English; Southern English
- Writing system: Latin (English alphabet); Unified English Braille

Language codes
- ISO 639-3: –

The English language spoken and written in England encompasses a diverse range of accents and dialects. The language forms part of the broader British English, along with other varieties in the United Kingdom. Terms used to refer to the English language spoken and written in England include English English, Anglo-English, and Homeland English.

The related term British English is ambiguous, so it can be used and interpreted in multiple ways, but it is usually reserved to describe the features common to Anglo-English, Welsh English, and Scottish English.

England, Wales, and Scotland are the three traditional countries on the island of Great Britain. The main dialect of the fourth country of the United Kingdom, Northern Ireland, is Ulster English, which is generally considered a dialect of Hiberno-English.

== General features ==
Many different accents and dialects are found throughout England, and people are often very proud of their local accent or dialect. However, accents and dialects also highlight social class differences, rivalries, or other associated prejudices, as illustrated by George Bernard Shaw's comment:

It is impossible for an Englishman to open his mouth without making some other Englishman hate or despise him.

As well as pride in one's accent, there is also stigma placed on many traditional working-class dialects. In his work on the dialect of Bolton, Graham Shorrocks wrote:

I have personally known those who would avoid, or could never enjoy, a conversation with a stranger, because they were literally too ashamed to open their mouths. It has been drummed into people—often in school, and certainly in society at large—that dialect speech is incorrect, impure, vulgar, clumsy, ugly, careless, shoddy, ignorant, and altogether inferior. Furthermore, the particularly close link in recent English society between speech, especially accents, and social class and values has made local dialect a hindrance to upward social mobility.

The three largest recognisable dialect groups in England are Southern English dialects, Midlands English dialects and Northern England English dialects. The most prominent isogloss is the foot–strut split, which runs roughly from mid-Shropshire (on the Welsh border) to south of Birmingham and then to the Wash. South of the isogloss (the Midlands and Southern dialects), the Middle English phoneme /ʊ/ split into /ʌ/ (as in cut, strut) and /ʊ/ (put, foot); this change did not occur north of the isogloss.

Most native Anglo-English speakers can tell the general region in England that a speaker comes from, and experts or locals may be able to narrow this down to within a few miles. Historically, such differences could be a major impediment to understanding between people from different areas. There are also many cases where a large city has a very different accent from the rural area around it (e.g. Bristol and Avon, Hull and the East Riding, Liverpool and Lancashire), although these differences have reduced in some parts of the country. Speakers may also change their pronunciation and vocabulary, particularly towards Received Pronunciation (RP) and Standard English when in public.

British and Irish varieties of English, including Anglo-English, are discussed in John C. Wells (1982). Some of the features of Anglo-English are that:

- Most versions of this dialect have non-rhotic pronunciation, meaning that /r/ is not pronounced in syllable coda position. Non-rhoticity is also found elsewhere in the English-speaking world, including in Australian English, New Zealand English, South African English, New York City English, African American English and a few dialects of Southern American English, as well as in most non-native varieties spoken throughout the Commonwealth of Nations. Rhoticity currently exists in the West Country, parts of Lancashire, the far north of England and the town of Corby; its presence in the last two can be attributed to Scottish influence on local speech. Additionally, people who are children of at least one American, Canadian, Irish or Scottish (and thus rhotic-accented) parent but grew up, or were educated, in England generally speak with non-rhotic accents.
- As noted above, Northern versions of the dialect lack the foot–strut split, so that there is no distinction between /ʊ/ and /ʌ/, making put and putt homophones as /pʊt/.
- In the Southern varieties, words like bath, cast, dance, fast, after, castle, grass, etc. are pronounced with the long vowel found in calm (that is, [ɑː] or a similar vowel), while in the Midlands and Northern varieties, they are pronounced with the same vowel as trap or cat, usually [a]. For more details see Trap–bath split. Some areas of the West Country use [aː] in both the TRAP and BATH sets. The Bristol area, although in the south of England, uses the short [a] in BATH.
- Many varieties undergo h-dropping, making harm and arm homophones. This is a feature of working-class accents across most of England but was traditionally stigmatised (a fact the comedy musical My Fair Lady was quick to exploit) but less so now. This was geographically widespread, but the linguist A. C. Gimson stated that it did not extend to the far north, nor to East Anglia, Essex, Wiltshire or Somerset. In the past, working-class people were often unsure where an h ought to be pronounced, and, when attempting to speak "properly", would often preface any word that began with a vowel with an h (e.g. "henormous" instead of enormous, "hicicles" instead of icicles); this was referred to as the "hypercorrect h" in the Survey of English Dialects, and is also referenced in literature (e.g. the policeman in Danny, the Champion of the World).
- A glottal stop for intervocalic /t/ is now common amongst younger speakers across the country; it was originally confined to some areas of the south-east and East Anglia.
- The distinction between /w/ and /hw/ in wine and whine is lost, "wh" being pronounced consistently as /w/.
- Most varieties have the horse–hoarse merger. However, some northern accents retain the distinction, pronouncing pairs of words like for/four, horse/hoarse and morning/mourning differently.
- The consonant clusters /sj/, /zj/, and /lj/ in suit, Zeus, and lute are preserved by some.
- Many Southern varieties have the bad–lad split, so that bad /bæːd/ and lad /læd/ do not rhyme.
- In most of the eastern half of England, plurals and past participle endings which are pronounced /ɪz/ and /ɪd/ (with the vowel of kit) in RP may be pronounced with a schwa /ə/. This can be found as far north as Wakefield and as far south as Essex. This is unusual in being an east–west division in pronunciation when English dialects generally divide between north and south. Another east–west division involves the rhotic [r]; it can be heard in the speech of country folk (particularly the elder), more or less west of the course of the Roman era road known as Watling Street (the modern A5), which at one time divided King Alfred's Wessex and English Mercia from the Danish kingdoms in the east. The rhotic [r] is rarely found in the east.
- Sporadically, miscellaneous items of generally obsolete vocabulary survive: come in the past tense rather than came; the use of thou and/or ye for you.

== Change over time ==
There has been academic interest in dialects since the late 19th century. The main works are On Early English Pronunciation by A.J. Ellis, English Dialect Grammar by Joseph Wright, and the English Dialect Dictionary also by Joseph Wright. The Dialect Test was developed by Joseph Wright so he could hear the differences in the vowel sounds of a dialect by listening to different people reading the same short text passage.

In the 1950s and 1960s, the Survey of English Dialects was undertaken to preserve a record of the traditional spectrum of rural dialects that merged into each other. The traditional picture was that there would be a few changes in lexicon and pronunciation every couple of miles, but that there would be no sharp borders between completely different ways of speaking. Within a county, the accents of the different towns and villages would drift gradually so that residents of bordering areas sounded more similar to those in neighbouring counties.

Because of greater social mobility and the teaching of "Standard English" in secondary schools, this model is no longer very accurate. There are some English counties in which there is little change in accent/dialect, and people are more likely to categorise their accent by a region or county than by their town or village. As agriculture became less prominent, many rural dialects were lost. Some urban dialects have also declined; for example, the traditional dialect of Bradford is now quite rarely spoken in the city, and call centres have seen Bradford as a useful location due to the fact that potential employees there nowadays generally lack dialectal speech. Some local call centres have stated that they were attracted to Bradford because it has a regional accent that is relatively easy to understand.

Concentrations of migration may cause a town or area to develop its own accent. The two most famous examples of this are Liverpool and Corby. Liverpool's dialect is influenced heavily by Irish and Welsh, and it sounds completely different from the surrounding areas of Lancashire. Corby's dialect is influenced heavily by Scots, and it sounds completely different from the rest of Northamptonshire. The Voices 2006 survey found that the various ethnic minorities that have settled in large populations in parts of Britain develop their own specific dialects. For example, Asian may have an Oriental influence on their accent so sometimes urban dialects are now just as easily identifiable as rural dialects, even if they are not from South Asia. In the traditional view, urban speech has just been seen as a watered-down version of that of the surrounding rural area. Historically, rural areas had much more stable demographics than urban areas, but there is now only a small difference between the two. It has probably never been true since the Industrial Revolution caused an enormous influx to cities from rural areas.

== Overview of regional accents ==
According to dialectologist Peter Trudgill, the major regional English accents of modern England can be divided on the basis on the following basic features; the word columns each represent the pronunciation of one italicised word in the sentence "Very few cars made it up the long hill". Two additional distinguishing features—the absence or presence of a trap–bath split and the realisation of the GOAT vowel—are also represented under the "path" and "stone" columns (so that the sentence could be rendered "Very few cars made it up the path of the long stone hill").

Accent name	Trudgill's accent region	Strongest centre	very	few	cars	made	up	path	long	stone	hill
Geordie	Northeast	Newcastle/Sunderland	/i/	/juː/	[ɒː]	[eː]	/ʊ/	/æ/ [a]	/ŋ/	[oː]	[hɪɫ]
Yorkshire	Central and Lower North	Leeds/Bradford	/ɪ/	/juː/	[äː]	[eː]	/ʊ/	/æ/ [a]	/ŋ/	[oː]	[ɪɫ]
Lancashire (traditional)	Central Lancashire	Rossendale	/ɪ/	/juː/	[aː^{ɹ}] (Note: The traditional feature of rhoticity in Lancashire is increasingly giving way to non-rhoticity: Beal, Joan (2004). "English dialects in the North of England: phonology". A Handbook of Varieties of English (pp. 113–133). Berlin, Boston: Mouton de Gruyter. p. 127.)	[eː]	/ʊ/	/æ/ [a]	/ŋg/	[oː]	[ɪɫ]
Scouse	Merseyside	Liverpool	/i/	/juː/	[äː]	[eɪ]	/ʊ/	/æ/ [a]	/ŋg/	[ou]	[ɪl]
Manchester	Northwest	Manchester/Salford	/ɪ/	/juː/	[äː]	[eɪ]	/ʊ/	/æ/ [a]	/ŋg/	[ɔʊ]	[ɪɫ]
Brummie	West Midlands	Birmingham	/i/	/juː/	[ɑː]	[ʌɪ]	/ʊ/	/æ/ [a]	/ŋg/	[ʌʊ]	[ɪɫ]
East Midlands	East, North, and South Midlands	Lincoln	/i/ (Note: [ɪ] defines the Central Midlands (centred on Nottingham and Derby).)	/juː/ (Note: [uː] defines the East Midlands (centred on Leicester and Rutland) and partly defines the South Midlands (centred on Northampton and Bedford).)	[ɑː]	[eɪ] (Note: [eː] defines South Humberside or North Lincolnshire (centred on Scunthorpe).)	/ʊ/	/æ/ [a]	/ŋ/	[ʌʊ]	[ɪl] (Note: [ɪo] defines the South Midlands (centred on Northampton and Bedford).)
West Country	Southwest	Bristol/Plymouth	/i/	/juː/	[ɑːɹ]	[eɪ] (Note: [eː] defines the Lower Southwest (Cornwall and Devon).)	/ʌ/	/æ/ [aː]	/ŋ/	[əʊ~ɔʊ]	[ɪɫ~ɪo] (Note: [ɪo] defines the Central Southwest.)
East Anglian (traditional)	East Anglia	Rural Norfolk/Suffolk	/i/	/uː/	[aː]	[æɪ] or [eː]	/ʌ/	/æ/ [æ]	/ŋ/	[ʊu]	[(h)ɪl]
London/Estuary (also Multicultural London English)	Home Counties	Greater London	/i/	/juː/	[ɑː]	[eɪ~æɪ]	/ʌ/	/ɑː/	/ŋ/	[ʌʊ], [oː] in MLE	[ɪo̯]
RP (modern)			/i/	/juː/	[ɑː]	[ɛi]	/ʌ/	/ɑː/	/ŋ/	[əʊ]	[hɪɫ]

=== Southern England ===
In general, Southern English accents are distinguished from Northern English accents primarily by not using the short a in words such as "bath". In the south-east, the broad A is normally used before a /f/, /s/ or /θ/: words such as "cast" and "bath" are pronounced /kɑːst/, /bɑːθ/ rather than /kæst/, /bæθ/. This sometimes occurs before /nd/: it is used in "command" and "demand" but not in "brand" or "grand".

In the south-west, an /aː/ sound is used in these words but also in words that take /æ/ in RP; there is no trap–bath split but both are pronounced with an extended fronted vowel.

Accents originally from the upper class speech of the London–Oxford–Cambridge triangle are particularly notable as the basis for RP.

Southern English accents have three main historical influences:

1. London accent, Cockney in particular
2. Received Pronunciation
3. Southern rural accents (such as West Country, Kent and East Anglian)

Relatively recently, the first two have increasingly influenced southern accents outside London via social class mobility and the expansion of London. From some time during the 19th century, middle and upper middle classes began to adopt affectations, including the RP accent, associated with the upper class. In the late 20th and 21st century other social changes, such as middle class RP-speakers forming an increasing component of rural communities, have accentuated the spread of RP. The South East coast accents traditionally have several features in common with the West Country; for example, rhoticity and the a: sound in words such as bath, cast, etc. However, the younger generation in the area is more likely to be non-rhotic and use the London/East Anglian A: sound in bath.

After the Second World War, about one million Londoners were relocated to new and expanded towns throughout the south east, bringing with them their distinctive London accent.

During the 19th century distinct dialects of English were recorded in Sussex, Surrey and Kent. These dialects are now extinct or nearly extinct due to improved communications and population movements.

=== South West England ===
The West Country dialects and accents are the English dialects and accents used by much of the indigenous population of South West England, the area popularly known as the West Country.

This region encompasses Bristol, Cornwall, Devon, Dorset and Somerset, while Gloucestershire, Herefordshire and Wiltshire are usually also included, although the northern and eastern boundaries of the area are hard to define and sometimes even wider areas are encompassed. The West Country accent is said to reflect the pronunciation of the Anglo-Saxons far better than other modern English Dialects.

In the nearby counties of Berkshire, Oxfordshire, Hampshire and the Isle of Wight, it was possible to encounter comparable accents and, indeed, distinct local dialects until perhaps the 1960s. There is now limited use of such dialects amongst older people in local areas. Although natives of such locations, especially in western parts, can still have West Country influences in their speech, the increased mobility and urbanisation of the population have meant that local Berkshire, Oxfordshire, Hampshire and Isle of Wight dialects (as opposed to accents) are today essentially extinct.

Academically the regional variations are considered to be dialectal forms. The Survey of English Dialects captured manners of speech across the West Country that were just as different from Standard English as anything from the far North. Close proximity has completely different languages such as Cornish, which is a Celtic language related to Welsh, and more closely to Breton. The Cornish dialect of English spoken in Cornwall by Cornish people is to some extent influenced by Cornish grammar, and often includes words derived from the language.

=== Norfolk ===
The Norfolk dialect is spoken in the traditional county of Norfolk and areas of north Suffolk. The group FOND (Friends of Norfolk Dialect) was formed to record the county's dialect and to provide advice for TV companies using the dialect in productions.

East Anglian dialect is also spoken in areas of Cambridgeshire. It is characterised by the use of [ei] for /iː/ in FLEECE words.

=== Midlands ===
- As in the North, Midlands accents generally do not use a broad A, so that cast is pronounced [kast] rather than the [kɑːst] pronunciation of most southern accents. The northern limit of the [ɑː] in many words crosses England from mid-Shropshire to The Wash, passing just south of Birmingham.
- Additionally, just like the North, most accents in the Midlands lack the foot–strut split, with words containing [ʌ] like strut or but being pronounced with [ʊ], without any distinction between putt and put.
- The West Midlands accent is often described as having a pronounced nasal quality, the East Midlands accent much less so.
- Old and cold may be pronounced as "owd" and "cowd" (rhyming with "loud" in the West Midlands and "ode" in the East Midlands), and in the northern Midlands home can become "wom".
- Whether Derbyshire should be classed as the West or East Midlands in terms of dialect is debatable. Stanley Ellis, a dialect expert, said in 1985 that it was more like the West Midlands, but it is often grouped with the East and is part of the region East Midlands.
- Cheshire, although part of the North-West region, is usually grouped the Midlands for the purpose of accent and dialect.

==== West Midlands ====
- The best-known accents in the West Midlands area are the Birmingham accents (see "Brummie") and the Black Country accent (Yam Yam).
- There is no Ng-coalescence. Cases of the spelling -ing are pronounced as [ɪŋɡ] rather than [ɪŋ]. Wells noted that there were no exceptions to this rule in Stoke-on-Trent, whereas there were for other areas with the [ɪŋɡ] pronunciation, such as Liverpool.
- Dialect verbs are used, for example am for are, ay for is not (related to ain't), bay for are not, bin for am or, emphatically, for are. Hence the following joke dialogue about bay windows: "What sort of windas am them?" "They'm bay windas." "Well if they bay windas wot bin them?".
- The Birmingham and Coventry accents are distinct, even though the cities are only 19 miles/30 km apart. Coventry is closer to an East Midlands accent.
- Around Stoke-on-Trent, the short i can sometimes sound rather like ee, as very obvious when hearing a local say it, however this is not always the case as most other words such as "miss" or "tip" are still pronounced as normal. The Potteries accent is perhaps the most distinctly 'northern' of the West Midlands accents, given that the urban area around Stoke-on-Trent is close to the Cheshire border.
- Herefordshire and parts of Worcestershire and Shropshire have a rhotic accent, somewhat like the West Country, and in some parts of these counties, the local accent mixes features with the Welsh accent, particularly in places closer to the English–Welsh border.

==== East Midlands ====
- East Midlands accents are generally non-rhotic, instead drawing out their vowels.
- The PRICE vowel has a very far back starting-point, and can be realised as [ɑɪ].
- Yod-dropping, as in East Anglia, can be found in some areas, for example new as /nuː/, sounding like "noo".
- In Lincolnshire, sounds like the u vowel of words like strut being realised as [ʊ] may be even shorter than in the North.
- In Leicester, words with short vowels such as up and last have a northern pronunciation, whereas words with vowels such as down and road sound rather more like a south-eastern accent. The vowel sound at the end of words like border (and the name of the city) is also a distinctive feature.
- Lincolnshire also has a marked north–south split in terms of accent. The north (around Grimsby and Scunthorpe) shares many features with Yorkshire, such as the open a sound in "car" and "park" or the replacement of take and make with tek and mek. The south of Lincolnshire is close to Received Pronunciation, although it still has a short Northern a in words such as bath. Accents in the north of the county are often classified as a form of Yorkshire, influenced by Hull, Doncaster and Sheffield.
- Mixing of the words was and were when the other is used in Standard English.
- In Northamptonshire, crossed by the north–south isogloss, residents of the north of the county have an accent similar to that of Leicestershire and those in the south an accent similar to rural Oxfordshire.
- The town of Corby in northern Northamptonshire has an accent with some originally Scottish features, apparently due to immigration of Scottish steelworkers. It is common in Corby for the GOAT set of words to be pronounced with /oː/. This pronunciation is used across Scotland and most of Northern England, but Corby is alone in the Midlands in using it.

=== Northern England ===
There are several features that are common to most of the accents of northern England:

- Northern English tends not to have /ʌ/ (strut, but, etc.) as a separate vowel. Most words that have this vowel in RP are pronounced with /ʊ/ in Northern accents, so that put and putt are homophonous as [pʊt]. But some words with /ʊ/ in RP can have [uː] in the more conservative Northern accents, so that a pair like luck and look may be distinguished as /lʊk/ and /luːk/.
- The accents of Northern England generally do not use a /ɑː/. so cast is pronounced [kast] rather than the [kɑːst] pronunciation of most southern accents. This pronunciation is found in the words that were affected by the trap–bath split.
- For many speakers, the remaining instances of RP /ɑː/ instead becomes [aː]: for example, in the words palm, cart, start, tomato.
- The vowel in dress, test, pet, etc. is slightly more open, transcribed by Wells as [ɛ] rather than [e].
- The "short a" vowel of cat, trap is normally pronounced [a] rather than the [æ] found in traditional Received Pronunciation and in many forms of American English.
- In most areas, the letter y on the end of words as in happy or city is pronounced [ɪ], like the i in bit, and not [i]. This was considered RP until the 1990s. The longer [i] is found in the far north and in the Merseyside area.
- The phonemes /eɪ/ (as in face) and /oʊ/ (as in goat) are often pronounced as monophthongs (such as [eː] and [oː]). However, the quality of these vowels varies considerably across the region, and this is considered a greater indicator of a speaker's social class than the less stigmatised aspects listed above.

Some dialect words used across the North are listed in extended editions of the Oxford Dictionary with a marker "North England": for example, the words ginnell and snicket for specific types of alleyway, the word fettle for to organise, or the use of while to mean until. The best-known Northern words are nowt, owt and summat, which are included in most dictionaries. For more localised features, see the following sections.

The "present historical" is named after the speech of the region, but it is often used in many working class dialects in the south of England too. Instead of saying "I said to him", users of the rule would say, "I says to him". Instead of saying, "I went up there", they would say, "I goes up there."

In the far north of England, the local speech is virtually indistinguishable from Scots. Wells claimed that northernmost Northumberland, "though politically English is linguistically Scottish".

==== Liverpool (Scouse) ====
The Liverpool accent, known as Scouse colloquially, is quite different from the accent of surrounding Lancashire. This is because Liverpool has had many immigrants in recent centuries, particularly Irish people. Irish influences on Scouse speech include the pronunciation of unstressed 'my' as 'me' and the pronunciation of 'th' sounds like 't' or 'd' (although they remain distinct as dental /t̪/ /d̪/). Other features of Scouse include the pronunciation of non-initial /k/ as [x] and the pronunciation of 'r' as a tap /ɾ/. Also, buck and book are usually distinguished as /bʊk/ and /buːk/.

==== Yorkshire ====
Wuthering Heights is one of the few classic works of English literature to contain a substantial amount of dialect, specifically Yorkshire dialect. Set in Haworth, the servant Joseph speaks in the traditional dialect of the area, which many modern readers struggle to understand. This dialect was still spoken around Haworth until the late 1970s, but now only a minority of the dialect's features are still in everyday use. The old dialect is now mainly encountered in Skipton, Otley, Settle and other similar places where older farmers from deep in the dales live. Examples of differences from RP in Yorkshire pronunciation include, but are not limited to:

- H-dropping
- /t/, /d/ and /k/ are often replaced with a glottal stop, [ʔ]
- The [ŋ] in hearing and eating is often changed to [n], though [ŋɡ] can be heard in Sheffield

==== Teesside ====
The accents of Teesside, usually known as Smoggy, are sometimes grouped with Yorkshire and sometimes grouped with the North-East of England, for they share characteristics with both accent regions. As this urban area grew in the early 20th century, there are fewer dialect words that date back to older forms of English; Teesside speak is the sort of modern dialect that Peter Trudgill identified in his "The Dialects of England". There is a Lower Tees Dialect group.

A recent study found that most people from Middlesbrough do not consider their accent to be "Yorkshire", but that they are less hostile to being grouped with Yorkshire than to being grouped with the Geordie accent. Intriguingly, speakers from Middlesbrough are occasionally mistaken for speakers from Liverpool as they share many of the same characteristics. It is thought the occasional similarities between the Middlesbrough and Liverpool accent may be due to the high number of Irish migrants to both areas during the late 1900s. Some examples of traits that are shared with [most parts of] Yorkshire include:

- H-dropping.
- An /aː/ sound in words such as start, car, park, etc.
- In common with the east coast of Yorkshire, words such as bird, first, nurse, etc. have an [ɛː] sound. It can be written as, baird, fairst, nairse. [This vowel sound also occurs in Liverpool and Birkenhead].

Examples of traits shared with the North-East include:

- Absence of definite article reduction.
- Glottal reinforcement for /k/, /p/ and /t/ can all occur.

The vowel in "goat" is an /oː/ sound, as is found in both Durham and rural North Yorkshire. In common with this area of the country, Middlesbrough is a non-rhotic accent.

The vowel in "face" is pronounced as /eː/, as is commonplace in the North-East of England.

==== Cumbria ====
- People from the Furness peninsula in south Cumbria tend to have a more Lancashire-orientated accent, whilst the dialect of Barrow-in-Furness itself is a result of migration from the likes of Strathclyde and Tyneside. Barrow grew on the shipbuilding industry during the 19th and 20th centuries, and many families moved from these already well-established shipbuilding towns to seek employment in Barrow.

==== North East England ====
- Dialects in this region are often known as Geordie (for speakers from the Newcastle upon Tyne area) or Mackem (for speakers from the Sunderland area). The dialects across the region are broadly similar however some differences do exist. For example, with words ending -re/-er, such as culture and father, the end syllable is pronounced by a Newcastle native as a short 'a', such as in 'fat' and 'back', therefore producing "cultcha" and "fatha" for "culture" and "father" respectively. The Sunderland area would pronounce the syllable much more closely to that of other accents. Similarly, Geordies pronounce "make" and "take" in line with the standard English pronunciation. However, a Mackem would pronounce these words as "mack" or "tack" (hence the origin of the term "Mackem"). For other differences, see the respective articles. For an explanation of the traditional dialects of the mining areas of County Durham and Northumberland see Pitmatic.
- Glottal reinforcement for /k/, /p/ and /t/. This feature is usually transcribed as [p͡ʔ], [t͡ʔ] and [k͡ʔ] or [ʔ͡p], [ʔ͡t] and [ʔ͡k].
- A feature of the North East accent, shared with Scots and Irish English, is the pronunciation of the consonant cluster -lm in coda position. As an example, "film" is pronounced as "fillum". Another of these features which are shared with Scots is the use of the word 'Aye', pronounced like 'I', its meaning is yes.
- Also similar to Scots, the modals 'can', and less commonly 'will', have contracted forms "cannet" and "winnet". Additionally, distinct negative forms of 'do' exist. In Tyneside and Northumberland, the local form is "divvent", whereas "dinnet" is prevalent in Sunderland and Durham.

== Examples of accents used by public figures ==
- Received Pronunciation: Queen Elizabeth II's accent changed slightly over the years but she still spoke a conservative form of RP until the end of her life. Margaret Thatcher, Colin Firth, Judi Dench, Ian McKellen, Charles III, Julie Andrews, Tony Benn, Noël Coward, David Cameron, Boris Johnson, Stephen Fry, Theresa May, Emma Thompson and David Dimbleby are examples of RP speakers.
- Berkshire (a southern rural accent): poet Pam Ayres is from Stanford in the Vale, which belonged to Berkshire until the boundary changes of 1974.
- Derby: actor Jack O'Connell.
- Hampshire (a southern rural accent): the late John Arlott, sports presenter and gardener Charlie Dimmock.
- Hertfordshire: comedian and writer Robert Newman.
- Lancashire: TV personality Fred Dibnah, comedian Peter Kay, McFly singer and guitarist Danny Jones, BBC Radio 1 DJ Vernon Kay and singer and actor Bernard Wrigley have degrees of broad Bolton accents. The actress Michelle Holmes has a Rochdale accent, which is similar to the accent of the western fringe of Yorkshire; hence, she has often featured in Yorkshire dramas. Julie Hesmondhalgh, Vicky Entwistle and Julia Haworth, actresses in the soap opera Coronation Street, have East Lancashire accents, which have slightly different intonation and rhythm and also feature variable rhoticity. Actress Jane Horrocks also has an East Lancashire accent, alongside being a mostly rhotic speaker.
- Leicester: The band Kasabian have Leicester accents.
- London: old recordings by Petula Clark, the Rolling Stones, and The Who (although many of these contain affected patterns). For clear examples, see actor Stanley Holloway (Eliza Doolittle's father in My Fair Lady), or footballer David Beckham.
  - Cockney: the actors Bob Hoskins and Michael Caine. Ray Winstone has quite an old-fashioned Cockney accent, and his replacement of an initial /r/ with a /w/ has been stigmatised. More examples can be heard in the movies Snatch and Lock, Stock and Two Smoking Barrels. The Sex Pistols had Cockney accents, with Steve Jones having the strongest.
  - Mockney: used by Guy Ritchie and many musicians, it is a variant of the London regional accent characterised by a non-standard mixture of linguistic and social class characteristics.
  - Estuary: athlete Sally Gunnell, the model Katie Price, celebrity chef Jamie Oliver
- Manchester: Oasis members Liam and Noel Gallagher, Herman's Hermits, actor Dominic Monaghan, broadcaster/podcaster Karl Pilkington, physicist Brian Cox, musician Davy Jones (The Monkees).
- Merseyside (Scouse):
  - Liverpool: Liverpool footballers Steven Gerrard and Jamie Carragher are often cited as having particularly strong Scouse accents. Recordings by The Beatles (George Harrison's accent was the strongest of the four), Gerry & The Pacemakers, Echo and the Bunnymen. Also the singer Cilla Black and the actors Craig Charles and Ricky Tomlinson. The British soap Brookside was set in Liverpool so the majority of the cast, including Philip Olivier and Jennifer Ellison, had Scouse accents.
  - St Helens: Comedian Johnny Vegas. The comedy band the Lancashire Hotpots sing in a traditional rhotic St Helens accent.
  - The Wirral: Comedian and TV presenter Paul O'Grady alias Lily Savage is from Birkenhead, pop singer Pete Burns of Dead or Alive is from the model village Port Sunlight.
- Nottingham: boxer Carl Froch.
- Salford: actor Christopher Eccleston, bands Happy Mondays and New Order.
- Stoke-on-Trent or The Potteries: pop star Robbie Williams, TV presenter Anthea Turner, ex pop star and TV presenter Jonathan Wilkes.
- Sunderland (Mackem): the accent of the rock group The Futureheads is easily detected on recordings and live performances and ex-footballer Chris Waddle.
- Tyneside (Geordie): former Cabinet members Alan Milburn MP and Nick Brown MP, the actors Robson Green and Tim Healy, the footballer Alan Shearer, actor and singer Jimmy Nail, rock singer Brian Johnson, singer Cheryl, television personalities Ant and Dec, Donna Air and Jayne Middlemiss.
- West Country: The Vicar of Dibley was set in Oxfordshire, and many of the characters had West Country accents.
  - Bristol: Professor Colin Pillinger of the Beagle 2 project, comedy writer, actor, radio DJ and director Stephen Merchant. Presenter and Comedian Justin Lee Collins.
  - Gloucestershire: Laurie Lee, ruralist.
- West Midlands: Phil Drabble, presenter of One Man and His Dog.
  - Birmingham (Brummie): the rock musician Ozzy Osbourne (although he sometimes Americanises his speech), Jasper Carrott. See Brummie for more examples.
  - Black Country (Yam Yam): Rob Halford.
  - Coventry: the actor Clive Owen, in the films Sin City and King Arthur. Singer-songwriter Terry Hall, lead vocalist with The Specials.
- Yorkshire:
  - Barnsley: in the 1969 film Kes, the lead characters, David Bradley and Freddie Fletcher, both have very broad Barnsley accents, which are less likely to be heard nowadays. Coronation Street actress Katherine Kelly, also has a Barnsley accent. Also, ex-union leader Arthur Scargill has a slightly reduced Barnsley accent.
  - Bradford: singers Gareth Gates, Zayn Malik of One Direction and Kimberley Walsh of Girls Aloud.
  - Hemsworth: cricketer Geoffrey Boycott has an accent similar to those found in many old coal-mining towns.
  - Holme Valley: Actors Peter Sallis and Bill Owen of Last of the Summer Wine and Sallis in Wallace and Gromit (although Sallis and Owen themselves were both Londoners).
  - Hull: Actors Tom Courtenay and Reece Shearsmith, and singer-songwriter Paul Heaton.
  - Leeds: Melanie Brown of the Spice Girls and Beverley Callard who plays Liz McDonald in Coronation Street, singer Corinne Bailey Rae, the band Kaiser Chiefs, model Nell McAndrew, actress Angela Griffin, Radio DJ Chris Moyles, Comedian Leigh Francis alias Keith Lemon.
  - Scarborough: characters from the 1998 film Little Voice.
  - Sheffield: Ken Loach's 1977 film The Price of Coal was filmed almost entirely in the traditional dialect of the Sheffield-Rotherham area, but this variety of speech is receding. For examples of less marked Sheffield speech, see Sean Bean, the band Pulp, the film The Full Monty and the band Arctic Monkeys.
  - South Humber: former England manager Graham Taylor and motorcycle racer Guy Martin.
  - Wakefield: singer and actress Jane McDonald, Hollyoaks actress Claire Cooper, actor Reece Dinsdale, Coronation Street's Helen Worth, the band the Cribs.

== Regional English accents in the media ==
The Archers has had characters with a variety of different West Country accents (see Mummerset).

The shows of Ian La Frenais and Dick Clement have often included a variety of regional accents, the most notable being Auf Wiedersehen Pet about Geordie men in Germany. Porridge featured London and Cumberland accents, and The Likely Lads featured north east England.

The programmes of Carla Lane such as The Liver Birds and Bread featured Scouse accents.

In the 2005 version of the science fiction programme Doctor Who, various Londoners wonder why the Doctor (played by Christopher Eccleston), an alien, sounds as if he comes from the North. Eccleston used his own Salford accent in the role; the Doctor's usual response is "Lots of planets have a North!" Other accents in the same series include Cockney (used by actress Billie Piper) and Estuary (used by actress Catherine Tate and David Tennant's Tenth Doctor)

A television reality programme Rock School was set in Suffolk in its second series, providing lots of examples of the Suffolk dialect.

== See also ==
- American and British English differences
- Languages of England
- Linguistic purism in English
- Regional accents of English speakers
