= Midlands English =

Midlands English refers to a number of distinct dialects spoken in the English Midlands. It may refer to:

- East Midlands English
- West Midlands English

It may also be confused with:

- Midland American English
