= Midland English =

Midland English or the Midland dialect(s) of English may refer to:

- East Midlands English, a dialect spoken in the United Kingdom, spoken in the eastern area of the English Midlands.
- West Midlands English, a dialect spoken in the United Kingdom, spoken in the western area of the English Midlands.
- Midland American English, a dialect spoken in the United States, spoken in parts of the Midwest, Pennsylvania, and southern New Jersey, and sometimes included, are the Appalachian dialects of West Virginia to Georgia.
