= Midlands =

Central part of England

The Midlands
- The Midlands shown in England
- Sovereign state: United Kingdom
- Constituent country: England
- Major cities: Birmingham; Coventry; Derby; Leicester; Lincoln; Nottingham; Stoke-on-Trent; Wolverhampton; Worcester
- Principal settlements: A 'Metro' cities B Other 'cities': A1. W Midlands urban area (Birmingham, Wolv'n); A2. Nottingham urban area; A3. Leicester urban area; A4. Stoke/Trent urban area; A5. Coventry urban area; B1. Derby; B2. Northampton; B3. Telford; B4. Chesterfield; B5. Worcester; B6. Lincoln; B7. Shrewsbury; B8. Hereford; B9. Stafford; B10. Warwick; B11. Oakham

Area
  - Total: 11,053 sq mi (28,627 km^{2})
- Highest elevation: 2,308 ft (703 m)

Population (2021 census)
  - Total: 10,831,000
  - Density: 979.92/sq mi (378.35/km^{2})
- Demonym(s): Midlander, Mercian
- Time zone: UTC+0 (Greenwich Mean Time)
  - Summer (DST): UTC+1 (British Summer Time)

The Midlands is the central part of England; it lies to the south of Northern England, to the north of Southern England, to the east of Wales and to the west of the North Sea. The Midlands comprises the ceremonial counties of Derbyshire, Herefordshire, Leicestershire, Lincolnshire, Northamptonshire, Nottinghamshire, Rutland, Shropshire, Staffordshire, Warwickshire, West Midlands and Worcestershire. For statistical purposes, the Midlands is divided into two statistical regions: the East Midlands and West Midlands. These had a combined population of 10.9 million at the 2021 census, and an area of 28,622 km^{2} (11,051 square miles). The northern part of Lincolnshire is part of the Yorkshire and the Humber statistical region, and not part of the Midlands. (Note: North and North East Lincolnshire are, however, both served by the East Midlands Ambulance Service.)

It also corresponds broadly to the early-medieval kingdom of Mercia. The Midlands became important in the Industrial Revolution of the 18th and 19th centuries, which led to one of its parts being named the Black Country. Culturally, the Midlands is distinct, but contains elements from both Northern and Southern England in the North-South divide. The Midlands' largest city, Birmingham, is the second-largest city in the United Kingdom. Other cities include Coventry, Derby, Leicester, Lincoln, Nottingham, Stoke-on-Trent, Wolverhampton, and Worcester.

== Definition and extent ==
There is no single definition for the Midlands. If defined as being made up of the statistical regions of East Midlands and West Midlands, it includes the counties of Derbyshire, Herefordshire, Leicestershire, most of Lincolnshire (with the exception of North and North East Lincolnshire), Northamptonshire, Nottinghamshire, Rutland, Shropshire, Staffordshire, Warwickshire, Worcestershire and the West Midlands metropolitan boroughs.

Other definitions include a slightly larger area and the 1911 Encyclopædia Britannica describes Gloucestershire as "West Midland", Bedfordshire as "South Midland", and Huntingdonshire as "East Midland" counties respectively. Cheshire is also occasionally recognised as being in the Midlands, while a lot of what was historically part of southern Mercia (Gloucestershire, Oxfordshire, Buckinghamshire, Bedfordshire, Hertfordshire, Huntingdonshire and Cambridgeshire) is often labelled as "Central England", typically used interchangeably with "the Midlands".

Additionally, there are two informal regions known as the South Midlands and North Midlands, which are not NUTS statistical regions of the United Kingdom and their definition varies by using organisation. The former includes the southern parts of the East Midlands and northern parts of Southern England. The latter covers the northern parts of the West and East Midlands, along with some southern parts of Northern England.

== Culture and identity ==
Due to being neither Northern England nor Southern England, the Midlands have had cultural elements from both sides in the North–South divide. In a binary choice, the Watford Gap in Northamptonshire is often considered the dividing point between the north and south of England, with most of the Midlands population sitting above this point. It has been suggested that due to being neither North or South, the Midlands have had an "image problem" and lack of "identity".

Different areas of the Midlands have their own distinctive character, giving rise to many local history and industrial heritage groups. Nottingham played a notable part in the English Civil War, which is commemorated in a number of place names (Parliament Terrace, Parliament Street, Standard Hill). Areas such as Derbyshire's Amber Valley and Erewash combine attractive countryside with industrial heritage and are home to historic canals and sites associated with the mining industry. The Black Country, broadly the boroughs of Dudley, Sandwell, Wolverhampton and Walsall, played an important part in the Industrial Revolution.

Various parts of the Midlands, particularly Warwickshire and Leicestershire, are on occasion referred to as the Heart of England, especially in tourist literature given that the geographic centre of England is generally considered to lie within this arc.

=== Symbolism ===
The officially recognised version of the St Alban's Cross attributed to Mercia

A saltire (diagonal cross) may have been used as a symbol of Mercia as early as the reign of Offa. By the 13th century, the saltire had become the attributed arms of the Kingdom of Mercia. The arms are blazoned Azure, a saltire Or, meaning a gold (or yellow) saltire on a blue field. The saltire is used as both a flag and a coat of arms. As a flag, it is flown from Tamworth Castle, the ancient seat of the Mercian kings.

The flag also appears on street signs welcoming people to Tamworth, the "ancient capital of Mercia". It was also flown outside Birmingham Council House during 2009 while the Staffordshire Hoard was on display in the city before being taken to the British Museum in London. The cross has been incorporated into a number of coats of arms of Midlands towns, including Tamworth, Leek and Blaby. It was recognised as the Mercian flag by the Flag Institute in 2014.

=== Language and dialect ===
The vowel "foot-strut split" cuts through Northamptonshire as well as Herefordshire and Shropshire according to this map.

Dialect is one of the fields where the Midlands may have mixed influences. A study has shown that some Midlands areas have traditionally had a dialect closer to "northern" but now more influenced by "southern". West Midlands English and East Midlands English are generalised groups of dialects spoken in the Midlands. The former notably includes the Brummie and Black Country dialects.

William Shakespeare, one of the most famous English poets in history, was from Warwickshire in the Midlands.

=== Food ===
The bakewell tart, Staffordshire oatcake, Melton Mowbray pork pie, and Coventry godcake, as well as Stilton cheese and haslet, are among some of the foods that have originated in the Midlands. The city of Birmingham has also been influential in dishes, notably the local version of Asian balti curry. Worcestershire sauce, as well as Walkers crisps and Cadbury chocolate are some of the most famous names to have come out of the Midlands.

=== Music ===
Numerous famous bands and artists have originated in the Midlands. Birmingham's Black Sabbath is considered to be pioneers of heavy metal music, while another band Godflesh have been named pioneers of industrial metal. Other notable Birmingham bands include The Moody Blues, Duran Duran, The Move, Electric Light Orchestra, Spencer Davis Group, Traffic, Fine Young Cannibals, Judas Priest, and UB40. The city has also been influential in bhangra music. Glam rock band Slade hail from Wolverhampton. The city of Coventry gave rise to the ska scene in the 1970s and bands such as The Specials. Discharge of Stoke-on-Trent have been highly influential in the punk music scene. Bauhaus, of Northampton, are one of the main pioneers of gothic rock. Grebo is a Midlands-centric genre of industrial indie dance punk music which emerged in the late 1980s in Stourbridge and Leicester, with bands such as Pop Will Eat Itself, Ned's Atomic Dustbin, Gaye Bykers on Acid, and The Wonder Stuff. More recently, the minimal punk duo Sleaford Mods have been known for making use of a strong local East Midland accent.

== Geography and cities ==
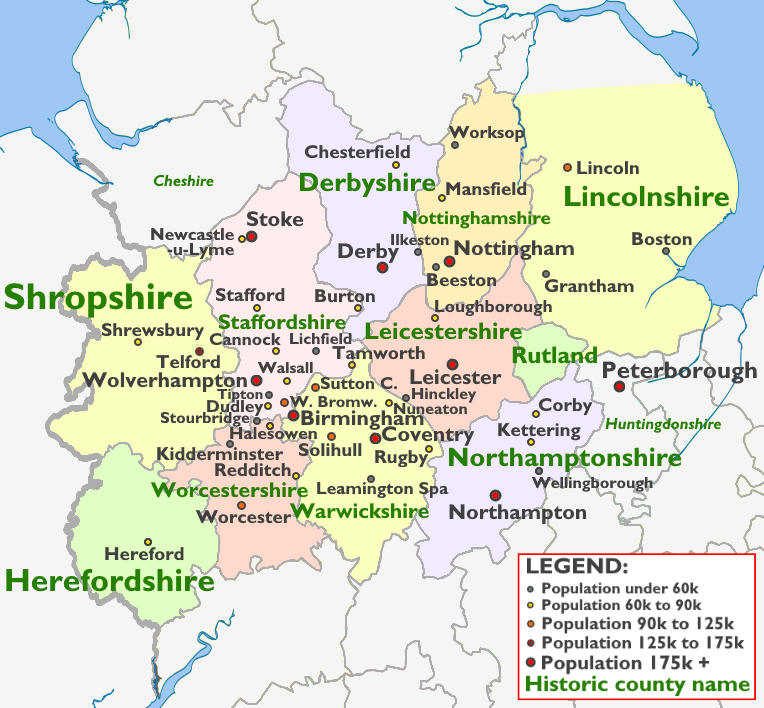
Map of the Midlands showing cities and other population centres alongside the historic counties

=== Geology ===
The area is predominantly low-lying and flat apart from isolated hills such as Turners Hill within the West Midlands conurbation at 271 m (889 ft) and the Wrekin just south of Wellington near Telford at 407 m (1,335 ft). Upland areas lie in its west and north, with the Shropshire Hills to the west, close to the England–Wales border and the Peak District area of the southern Pennines in its north. The Shropshire Hills reach a height of 540 m (1,771 ft) at Brown Clee Hill and includes the Long Mynd, Clee Hills and Stiperstones ridge. Wenlock Edge, running through the middle of the Shropshire Hills Area of Outstanding Natural Beauty (AONB), is a long, low ridge, which extends for over 15 miles (24 km). The Peak District reaches heights of between 300 m (1,000 ft) and 600 m (2,000 ft); Kinder Scout is the highest point at 636 m (2,086 ft). Further south, the Welsh border reaches over 700 m (2,000 ft) high, at Twyn Llech (Black Mountain), which at 703 m (2,306 ft) is thus the highest point in Herefordshire.

The Precambrian Malverns are formed of some of the oldest rock in England (dating from the Cryogenian period, at around 680 million years old) and extend for 8 miles (13 km) through two West Midlands counties (Worcestershire and Herefordshire) as well as northern Gloucestershire in the southwest. The highest point of the hills is the Worcestershire Beacon at 425 m (1,394 ft) above sea level (OS Grid reference SO768452).

The Cotswolds – designated an AONB in 1966. – extend for over 90 miles (140 km) through Oxfordshire, Gloucestershire, Wiltshire, Somerset, Warwickshire, and Worcestershire. They reach a highest point of 330 m (1,082 ft) at Cleeve Hill.

Areas of lower hills, in the range 200 m (600 ft) – 300 m (1000 ft), include Charnwood Forest in Leicestershire, Cannock Chase in Staffordshire, and the Lincolnshire Wolds (100 m (300 ft) – 200 m (600 ft)); the latter having some prominence despite their modest altitude given their location in typically low-lying Lincolnshire near to the east coast.

Lincolnshire is the only coastal county in the Midlands as its west is bordered by Wales. It is also where the Midlands' lowest points can be found as some places fall below sea level, with the lowest points being near Thorpe Tilney in North Kesteven and Stickford in East Lindsey.

=== Climate ===
The Midlands has a temperate maritime climate, with cold, cloudy, wet winters and comfortable, mostly dry, mostly sunny summers. The temperature usually ranges from −0.4 °C (31.3 °F) during winter nights to 24.1 °C (75.4 °F) during summer days. Due to its geographical location, which is furthest away from the coast than anywhere else in England, it typically receives mostly light winds, with warm days and cold nights. Sometimes the Midlands can have very cold nights such as a minimum of −18.7 °C (−1.7 °F) in Pershore on 20 December 2010. The previous day had a maximum of only −8.2 °C (17.2 °F), also in Pershore. Hot days are also possible, such as a maximum of 34 °C (93 °F) in Pershore on 19 July 2006. There can also be very mild winters nights, such as in Bidford-on-Avon when the temperature at 6 pm was as high as 15.2 °C (59.4 °F) on 9 January 2015. At 8 am the following morning the temperature was still at 13 °C (55 °F). Both the highest and lowest temperature ever recorded in England were in the Midlands, the former on 19 July 2022 around Coningsby in Lincolnshire where it reached a maximum temperature of 40.3 °C (104.5 °F), and the latter on 10 January 1982 around Newport in Shropshire where it dropped to a minimum of −26.1 °C (−15.0 °F).

Climate data for Midlands
| Month | Jan | Feb | Mar | Apr | May | Jun | Jul | Aug | Sep | Oct | Nov | Dec | Year |
|---|---|---|---|---|---|---|---|---|---|---|---|---|---|
| Mean daily maximum °C (°F) | 6.7 (44.1) | 7 (45) | 9.7 (49.5) | 12.5 (54.5) | 15.9 (60.6) | 18.8 (65.8) | 21.1 (70.0) | 20.8 (69.4) | 17.8 (64.0) | 13.7 (56.7) | 9.6 (49.3) | 6.9 (44.4) | 13.4 (56.1) |
| Mean daily minimum °C (°F) | 1 (34) | 0.8 (33.4) | 2.4 (36.3) | 3.7 (38.7) | 6.5 (43.7) | 9.4 (48.9) | 11.5 (52.7) | 11.3 (52.3) | 9.3 (48.7) | 6.5 (43.7) | 3.5 (38.3) | 1.3 (34.3) | 5.6 (42.1) |
| Average rainfall mm (inches) | 74 (2.9) | 54 (2.1) | 58.8 (2.31) | 59.1 (2.33) | 58.5 (2.30) | 62.3 (2.45) | 60.8 (2.39) | 66.9 (2.63) | 66.2 (2.61) | 82 (3.2) | 77.1 (3.04) | 78.7 (3.10) | 798.4 (31.36) |
| Average rainy days (≥ 1 mm) | 12.9 | 10.2 | 11.5 | 10.6 | 10.2 | 9.7 | 9.4 | 10 | 9.7 | 12.2 | 12.5 | 12.4 | 131.3 |
| Mean monthly sunshine hours | 52.1 | 71.4 | 104.8 | 147 | 183.2 | 174.7 | 189.6 | 177.6 | 132.2 | 99.4 | 61.2 | 45 | 1,438.2 |
Source: Met Office

=== Largest settlements and urban areas ===
Largest cities and towns in the Midlands 2021 Census
| Rank | | Counties | Pop. | Rank | | Counties | Pop. |
|---|---|---|---|---|---|---|---|
| 1 | Birmingham | West Midlands | 1,121,375 | 11 | Worcester | Worcestershire | 105,465 |
| 2 | Leicester | Leicestershire | 406,580 | 12 | Lincoln | Lincolnshire | 104,555 |
| 3 | Coventry | West Midlands | 344,285 | 13 | West Bromwich | West Midlands | 103,110 |
| 4 | Nottingham | Nottinghamshire | 299,790 | 14 | Royal Sutton Coldfield | West Midlands | 93,375 |
| 5 | Derby | Derbyshire | 275,575 | 15 | Nuneaton | Warwickshire | 88,815 |
| 6 | Stoke-on-Trent | Staffordshire | 260,560 | 16 | Redditch | Worcestershire | 81,635 |
| 7 | Northampton | Northamptonshire | 243,520 | 17 | Rugby | Warwickshire | 78,120 |
| 8 | Wolverhampton | West Midlands | 234,025 | 18 | Newcastle-under-Lyme | Staffordshire | 76,505 |
| 9 | Telford | Shropshire | 156,910 | 19 | Chesterfield | Derbyshire | 76,420 |
| 10 | Solihull | West Midlands | 107,735 | 20 | Burton upon Trent | Staffordshire | 76,255 |

The table below shows the urban areas in the Midlands with a population of at least 250,000.

Largest urban areas in the Midlands (2011 census)
| Rank | Area | Population | Area (km^{2}) | Density (People/km^{2}) | Primary settlements (Note: ONS definition.) |
|---|---|---|---|---|---|
| 1 | West Midlands | 2,440,986 | 598.9 | 4,076 | Birmingham, Wolverhampton, Solihull, Sutton Coldfield, Dudley, West Bromwich, Walsall, Stourbridge, Halesowen, Willenhall, Kingswinford, Smethwick, Bloxwich, Tipton |
| 2 | Nottingham | 729,977 | 176.4 | 4,139 | Nottingham, Beeston, Carlton, West Bridgford, Ilkeston, Arnold, Long Eaton, Hucknall |
| 3 | Leicester | 508,916 | 109.4 | 4,953 | Leicester, Wigston, Oadby, Blaby/Whetstone, Birstall |
| 4 | Stoke-on-Trent | 372,775 | 103.9 | 3,588 | Stoke-on-Trent, Newcastle-under-Lyme, Kidsgrove |
| 5 | Coventry | 359,262 | 81.3 | 4,420 | Coventry, Bedworth |
| 6 | Derby | 270,468 | 64.1 | 4,219 | Derby, Borrowash, Duffield |

== Divisions ==
The West Midlands and East Midlands regions are ITL 1 statistical regions (previously NUTS 1) and were formerly constituencies of the European Parliament. Local government in the Midlands is as follows:

The Midlands

- Boroughs (Metropolitan or Unitary):
  - (1) Birmingham (Metropolitan borough).
  - (2) Coventry (Metropolitan borough).
  - (3) Derby (Unitary authority).
  - (4) Dudley (Metropolitan borough).
  - (5) Leicester (Unitary authority).
  - (6) Nottingham (Unitary authority).
  - (7) Sandwell (Metropolitan borough).
  - (8) Stoke-on-Trent (Unitary authority).
  - (9) Solihull (Metropolitan borough).
  - (10) Telford and Wrekin (Unitary authority).
  - (11) Walsall (Metropolitan borough).
  - (12) Wolverhampton (Metropolitan borough).
- Counties (Non-metropolitan or Unitary):
  - (13) Derbyshire (Districts: (a) Amber Valley, (b) Bolsover, (c) Chesterfield, (d) Derbyshire Dales, (e) Erewash, (f) High Peak, (g) North East Derbyshire and (h) South Derbyshire).
  - (14) Herefordshire (Unitary authority).
  - (15) Leicestershire (Districts: (a) Blaby, (b) Charnwood, (c) Harborough, (d) Hinckley and Bosworth, (e) Melton, (f) North West Leicestershire and (g) Oadby and Wigston).
  - (16) Lincolnshire (Districts: (a) Boston, (b) East Lindsey, (c) Lincoln, (d) North Kesteven, (e) South Holland, (f) South Kesteven and (g) West Lindsey).
  - (17) North Northamptonshire (Unitary authority).
  - (18) Nottinghamshire (Districts: (a) Ashfield, (b) Bassetlaw, (c) Broxtowe, (d) Gedling, (e) Mansfield, (f) Newark and Sherwood and (g) Rushcliffe).
  - (19) Rutland (Unitary authority).
  - (20) Shropshire (Unitary authority).
  - (21) Staffordshire (Districts: (a) Cannock Chase, (b) East Staffordshire, (c) Lichfield, (d) Newcastle-under-Lyme, (e) South Staffordshire, (f) Stafford, (g) Staffordshire Moorlands and (h) Tamworth).
  - (22) Warwickshire (Districts: (a) North Warwickshire, (b) Nuneaton and Bedworth, (c) Rugby, (d) Stratford-on-Avon and (e) Warwick).Royal Leamington spa
  - (23) West Northamptonshire (Unitary authority).
  - (24) Worcestershire (Districts: (a) Bromsgrove, (b) Malvern Hills, (c) Redditch, (d) Worcester, (e) Wychavon and (f) Wyre Forest).

The unitary authorities of North Lincolnshire and North East Lincolnshire (not shown), while classed as part of the ceremonial county of Lincolnshire, actually come under the Yorkshire and the Humber region and are therefore not in the officially recognised East Midlands region.

The two regions of the Midlands have a combined population of 10,350,697 (2014 mid-year estimate), and an area of 11,053 sq mi (28,630 km^{2}).

The largest Midlands conurbation, which includes the cities of Birmingham and Wolverhampton, is roughly covered by the metropolitan county of the West Midlands (which also includes the city of Coventry); with the related City Region extending into neighbouring areas of Shropshire, Staffordshire, Warwickshire and Worcestershire.

=== Historic counties ===
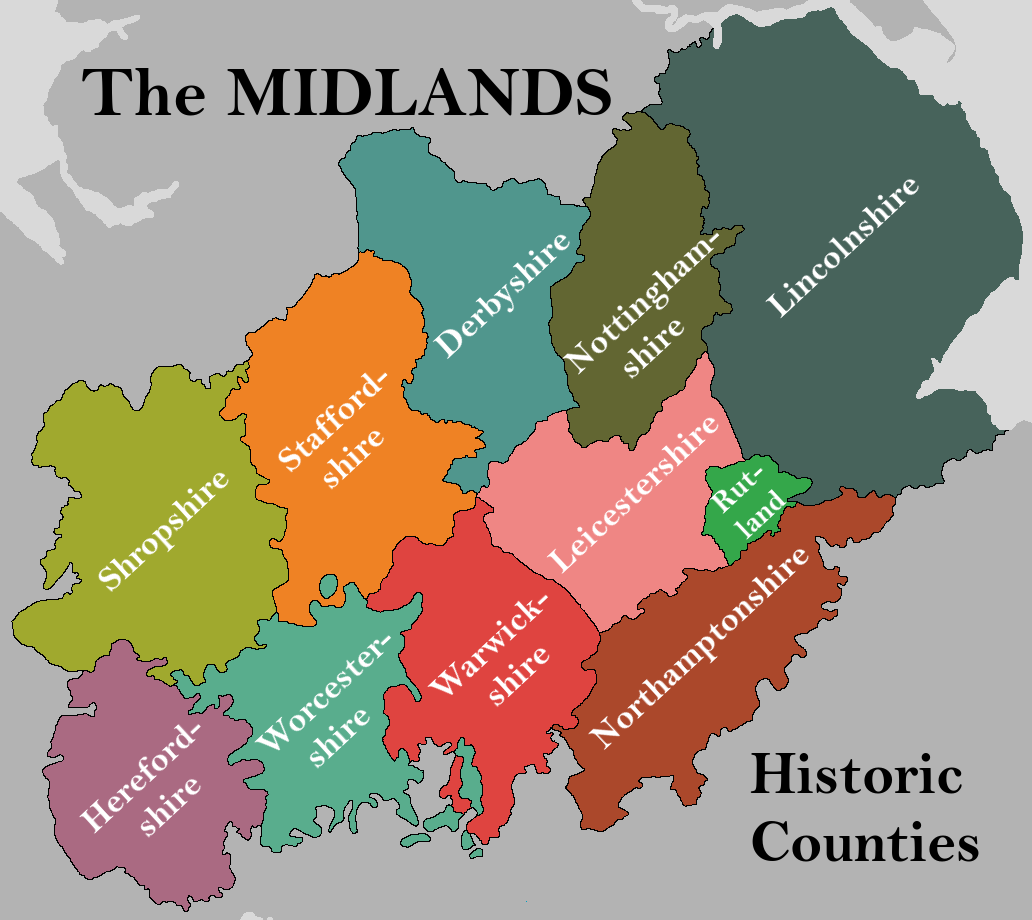
Midlands historic counties

The historic counties ceased to be used for any administrative purpose in 1899, though most survived, albeit often with altered borders, until the Local Government Act 1972. They still remain important to some people, notably for county cricket.

- Derbyshire
- Herefordshire
- Leicestershire
- Lincolnshire
- Northamptonshire
- Nottinghamshire
- Rutland
- Shropshire
- Staffordshire
- Warwickshire
- Worcestershire

== Organisations with Midlands in their name ==
The "midland" name has been used for:

- Midland Bank, founded in Birmingham and now part of HSBC
- Midland Metro, now called West Midlands Metro
- Midlands Engine, a regeneration programme of the UK government
- Midland Main Line, a railway from London through the East Midlands to Sheffield

== See also ==
- Subdivisions of England
- East Midlands category
- West Midlands category
