= Brummie dialect =

Dialect of English spoken in Birmingham, England

Birmingham dialect
- Brummie dialect
- Native to: United Kingdom
- Region: Birmingham, England
- Language family: Indo-European: Germanic; West Germanic; North Sea Germanic; Anglo-Frisian; Anglic; English; British English; West Midlands English; Birmingham dialect
- Early forms: Old English: Middle English; Early Modern English

Language codes
- ISO 639-3: –
- Glottolog: None

Speech example
An example of a male speaker from Moseley, Birmingham (Carl Chinn).

Speech example
An example of a male speaker from Handsworth, Birmingham (Benjamin Zephaniah).

The Brummie dialect, or more formally the Birmingham dialect, is spoken by many people in Birmingham, England, and some of its surrounding area. "Brummie" is also a demonym for people from Birmingham. It is often erroneously used in referring to all accents of the West Midlands, as it is markedly distinct from the traditional accent of the adjacent Black Country, but modern-day population mobility has tended to blur the distinction. To a degree, the Brummie accent now extends into some parts of the Metropolitan Borough of Solihull, but much of the accent within the borough might be considered to be closer to Standard Southern British (SSB).

== Name ==
The term Brummie derives from Brummagem or Bromwichham, which are historical variants of the name Birmingham.

== Accent ==
The strength of a person's accent can vary greatly all across Birmingham. As with most cities, the local accent changes relative to the area of the city in question. A common misconception is that everyone in Birmingham speaks the same accent. It could be argued that Brummie is an accent rather than a dialect as opposed to Black Country speech, which is a dialect with unique words and phrases, such as "owamya?" for how are you, which, many comment, is not used in Brummie speech. Similarly, Brummies generally use the word I while pronouncing it as 'oy', whereas Black Country natives instead use the dialectal term 'Ah', as in 'Ah bin', meaning I have been.

Thorne (2003) has said that the accent is "a dialectal hybrid of northern, southern, Midlands, Warwickshire, Staffordshire and Worcestershire speech", also with elements from the languages and dialects of its Asian and Afro-Caribbean communities.

There are also differences between Brummie and Black Country accents, which are not readily apparent to people from outside the West Midlands. A Black Country accent and a Birmingham accent can be hard to distinguish if neither accent is that broad. Phonetician John Wells has admitted that he cannot tell any difference between the accents.

Many historians and scholars argue that rhymes and vocabulary in the works of the Warwickshire native William Shakespeare suggest that he used a local dialect in his work, either that of Stratford-upon-Avon or, more broadly, a Brummie, Cotswold, Warwickshire, or other Midlands dialect. However, not all historians accept this argument, and Shakespeare's own accent will certainly have been distinct from any modern English one, including any of the Midlands today.

=== Stereotypes ===
According to Thorne (2003), among UK listeners "Birmingham English in previous academic studies and opinion polls consistently fares as the most disfavoured variety of British English, yet with no satisfying account of the dislike". He alleges that overseas visitors, in contrast, find it "lilting and melodious", and from this claims that such dislike is driven by various linguistic myths and social factors peculiar to the UK ("social snobbery, negative media stereotyping, the poor public image of the City of Birmingham, and the north/south geographical and linguistic divide").

For instance, despite the city's cultural and innovative history, its industrial background (as depicted by the arm-and-hammer in Birmingham's coat of arms) has led to a muscular and unintelligent stereotype: a "Brummagem screwdriver" is UK slang for a hammer.

Thorne also cites the mass media and entertainment industry where actors, usually non-Birmingham, have used inaccurate accents and/or portrayed negative roles.

Advertisements are another medium where many perceive stereotypes. Journalist Lydia Stockdale, writing in the Birmingham Post, commented on advertisers' association of Birmingham accents with pigs: the pig in the ad for Colman's Potato Bakes, Nick Park's Hells Angel Pigs for British Gas, the puppet simply known as Pig from Pipkins and ITV's "Dave the window-cleaner pig" all had Brummie accents. In 2003, a Halifax bank advertisement featuring Howard Brown, a Birmingham-born and based employee, was replaced by an animated version with an exaggerated comical accent overdubbed by a Cockney actor.

== Grammar ==
Older speakers tend to use more of these grammatical features, where younger speakers mostly use phonological and intonational features in the sections described below.

- Double negatives are typical in Brummie as with many other dialects around the world. Syntactical examples include don't want none, hadn't got no, can't find none nowhere, hadn't got hardly any and without no.
- Similarly, Brummie also utilizes double comparatives, such as more happier or more cuter (compare standard happier/cuter). Note also bestest for best, badder/worser for worse and baddest/wors(t)est for worst.
- The plural demonstrative those is typically replaced by them (e.g., "Them was good days").
- Relative pronouns who or that are frequently substituted with what or as (e.g., "the chap what fixed my car"). This specific substitution is heavily prevalent in urban centers across the Midlands and the North of England.
- Prepositions are often substituted; up is frequently used instead of to (e.g., "He went up the pub"), off is used instead of from (e.g., "I got a letter off our brother") and on replaces of.

=== Pronouns ===
The following table outlines the Birmingham pronominal system. Note the frequent dropping of initial h and th sounds, as well as the unique possessive and object forms.

The Birmingham pronominal system
Person	Nominative	Accusative	Dative	Genitive	
Person	Nominative	Accusative	Dative	Adjective	Pronoun
1st singular	I	us / me	us / me	me / ma	mine
2nd singular	yo / you	yer / you	yer / you	your	yourn
3rd singular	(h)e / er / it	(h)im / er / it	(h)im / er / it	(h)is / er / its	(h)isn / ern / its
1st plural	we	us	us	our / us	ourn
2nd plural	yous / you	yous / you	yous / you	your	yourn
3rd plural	they	(th)em	(th)em	their	theirn

- The second-person plural pronoun is often yous (or youse), which acts as the subject, direct object and indirect object. This is a feature shared with many Northern English dialects resulting from Irish immigration.
- Possessive pronouns frequently take an -n suffix, creating forms like yourn (yours), (h)isn (his), ern (hers), ourn (ours) and theirn (theirs).
- The first-person singular object pronoun me is commonly replaced by us (e.g., "give it us").
- The third-person feminine subject pronoun she is commonly replaced by er.
- Reflexive pronouns are regularized across the paradigm to be based on possessive pronouns, resulting in forms like (h)isself and theirselves.

=== Contractions ===
Contractions in Brummie contain unique expressions for the area. Most involve negation particles.

Brummie	Standard	Pronunciation	Example	Notes
ain't	haven't	/ɪnt ~ ɛnt ~ æɪnt/	I ain't seen 'er in donkey's years.	Used as a common vernacular in many other areas. Unique to Brummie though, when meaning "haven't", pronunciations range from in't ~ en't ~ ain't.
ain't	isn't/aren't	/æɪnt/	She ain't joinin' us.	Used as a common vernacular in many other areas. Unique to Brummie though, when meaning "haven't", pronunciations range from in't ~ en't ~ ain't.
bain't	am not (cf. Hiberno-English amn't)	/bæɪnt/	I bain't doin' owt with me babby today.	Used only with the first person pronoun I.
cor / caw	can't	/kɔː/	I cor see the point myself.	Common in both Brummie and Black Country dialects.
dain't / day	didn't	/dæɪn(t) ~ dɪn ~ deɪ/	They dain't got no time for playin' with 'em.	The form day or deint is historically common across the region.
gonna / gunna	going to, gonna	/gʊnə ~ gɒnə/	We're gonna 'ave a bostin' jolly up at the park this weekend.	Varies from gunna to gonna.
ne'er / nare	never	/nɜː/	I ne'er thought I'd see the day.	Regularly used as a negative preterite meaning "not on one specific occasion".
worn't	wasn't / weren't	/wɔːnt/	I worn't thinking a-gooin' up the pub today.	Acts as the negated past tense form for both the first and third person.
wun't	won't	/wʊnt/	She wun't be 'appy at all when she 'ears what 'appened 'ere.	Pronounced with a short vowel sound.

=== Morphophonology ===
- The past tense forms of strong verbs are often simplified. Examples include kept to kep', swept to swep' and wept to wep'.
- Older Brummies often pronounce nouns ending in -ce with a /-z-/ in the plural form, where it would not be in the standard language. Eye dialect spellings that demonstrate this phenomenon include writing fazes instead of faces, plazes for places, and prizes for prices.
- The third-person present of go, goes, is usually pronounced [gʊz]. The "going to" future form has variants ranging from [gʊnə] to [gɒnə].
- Several verb forms, including make, made and take, realise the vowel as monophthongal /mɛk, mɛd, tɛk/, similar to the monophthongisation of RP says or said.
- Standard English irregular verbs are widely regularized, utilizing the -ed suffix for both past tense and past participle forms (e.g., knowed for knew/known, catched for caught, and drawed for drew).
- Past participles are frequently used in place of the past simple tense (e.g., "I done that" or "I seen him"), and the present simple is sometimes used in place of the past participle (e.g., "I'd 'ave give up").
- Noun pluralization among older speakers occasionally retains the Old English -en suffix, most notably in the word housen for houses.
- The pronouns he, him, his, her, along with the related forms have, has and had are often orthographically represented with an apostrophe ('e, 'im, 'is, 'er, 'ave, 'as and 'ad respectively), reflecting the phenomenon of H-dropping (see #Phonology below).

== Phonology ==
Much of the information below is taken from Thorne (2003) with supplementary information from Clark (2004) and Clark (2013).

=== Consonants ===
- Like the West Midlands accents of the north, and many other Northern English accents, NG-coalescence is absent, with /ŋ/ being pronounced as [ŋɡ].
  - This velar nasal plus feature is subject to stylistic and age-based variation. Word-final G-dropping is varied upon social class; with [ɪŋ] being favoured by middle-class speakers and [ɪŋɡ, ɪn] by the working class. Older working-class speakers often drop the [ɡ] and use the bare nasal [n], especially in present participle endings like singing. Younger speakers, conversely, tend to use the [ŋg] pronunciation more frequently, especially in nouns ending in [ŋ] in RP.
- H-dropping is present, which mirrors many other working-class British accents. It is, however, most consistent with function words, as mentioned above.
  - Hypercorrection with /h/ commonly occurs with younger middle-class people as well as some older working class, with words such as April and orange being pronounced and represented as Hapril and horange. This is especially seen if the other person addressed appears to be of a higher social status or upper class.
  - Speakers also use the indefinite article an before words beginning with ⟨h⟩ such as an 'ouse. This is a further extension to standardized accents such as RP, where it is only used in learned terms such as hour or honest.
- Th-fronting of /θ, ð/ to /f, v/ respectively is an innovation spreading among an increasing number of teenagers, particularly working-class males, and is nearly categorical with some boys. /θ/ especially occurs before /r/ at the beginning of a word (as in through) however, /ð/ is not fronted word-initially (e.g. this). These phenomena are also common with other regional British dialects.
- Under influence of Estuary English, T-glottalization occurs intervocalically and word-finally, albeit primarily in younger speakers, while middle-aged and elderly Brummies generally retain the voiceless alveolar plosive.
  - Additionally, the T-to-R rule is widespread, where intervocalic /t/ is tapped to an [ɾ] or [ɹ] (e.g., get a becomes [ˈɡɛ̝ɾæ̞~ˈɡɛ̝ɹæ̞] gerra, put on becomes [pəˈɾɒn~pəˈɹɒn] purron).
- The accent is non-rhotic, which means that the consonant /r/ is not pronounced at the syllable rime. However, when as an onset, it is rendered as a single tapped /ɾ/ like of Scottish English varieties: the most prominent examples include intervocalically in disyllabic words, such as marry, perhaps (note the 'h' here is silent) and worry, as well as following a velar or bilabial stop in monosyllabic words, like bright or cream. Other onset environments are otherwise realized as /ɹ/.
  - Linking and intrusive R are essentially universal in Birmingham and the rest of the urban West Midlands region, similar to all other British dialects.
- Yod-dropping (the elision of /j/) is common across age groups in words such as new or few, leading to pronunciations like [nuː].
- The realization of /l/ differs significantly from Received Pronunciation. For male speakers, /l/ is frequently dark ([ɫ]) in all positions. Furthermore, L-vocalization (vocalizing the /l/ into a vowel sound) is increasingly common among younger speakers. However, Thorne (2003) specifies that /l/ is typically dark word-finally and pre-consonantally, but remains clear word-initially, post-initially, word-medially, and word-finally before a following vowel.

=== Vowels ===
==== Monophthongs ====
Monophthongs of Brummie
	Front		Central	Back	
	short	long	Central	short	long
Close	ɪ	iː		ʊ	uː
Mid	ɛ	ɛː	ɜː	(ʌ)	ɔː
Open	a			ɒ	ɑː

- The FLEECE is diphthongized, though the exact quality varies based on description: Wells (1982) lists [ɪi~əi], Thorne (2003) mentions [ɜi].
  - HAPPY is also diphthongal, however it can also be [iː]. Thorne (2003) mentions that this is mostly the case for younger speakers.
- KIT is commonly a very close and front [ɪ̝], although other sources claim an even closer and fronter [i] in stressed syllables, which is considered the most distinct phoneme in this dialect. Thorne (2003) states that the audible level of closeness and frontedness of this vowel remains constant and is seldom affected by word stress or intonational variation, with Clark (2004) similarly noting [ɪ̝]-like realizations as typical of Birmingham in both stressed and unstressed syllables.
  - The weak vowel merger is generally absent in Birmingham, maintaining full vowels in places where RP has shifted towards a more reduced vowel quality; in RP, affixes such as -ace, -ate, -ily, -ity, -ible, -less and -let as well as the prefixes be-, de-, e- and re- have tended towards a reduced /ə/ during the 20th century whereas Brummie consistently uses a full vowel [ɪ̝] in these morphemes. However, Thorne (2003) cites Gimson & Cruttenden (1994, pp. 98–101) on the word visibility as an exception to the rule, pronounced as [ˌvɪ̝zɪ̝ˈbɪ̝lətiː ~ -tɜi], where only the vowel on the penultimate syllable is reduced to [ə]. In RP, it is pronounced as /ˌvɪzəˈbɪləti/.
- In working class and older speech, LOT is typically /ʊ/, leading to a merger with FOOT/STRUT. However an RP-influenced /ɒ/ can be seen from younger or more upper-class speakers.
  - The LOT–CLOTH split is present in older Brummies, with words such as cough, cross and off using /ɔː/. This feature mirrors conservative RP speech.
- The FOOT–STRUT split is absent or partially realized, resulting in a "fudged lect". Like all of Northern England, the explicit split is generally absent; however, unlike Northern dialects, the STRUT set features a range of intermediate realizations from [ʊ] through [ɤ] to [ʌ], allowing speakers to exist on a continuum between Northern and Southern English.
- GOOSE, like FLEECE also varies in realization: [ʊu~əu] or [ɜu]. Older speakers may have an offglide of [uːə]. Some speakers also use this sound to merge with MOUTH (see #Diphthongs below).
- Realization of NURSE is [ə̝ː~ɨ̝ː] according to Wells (1982) or [ɜ̝ː] according to Thorne (2003). Older, more traditional realisations are fronter, ranging from [eə~œː~eː]. These are pronounced with the tongue closer to the mouth than other English accents such as RP ([ɜ̞ː]), however similar pronunciations can also be found in Australia and South Africa.
  - There is a near-merger of the NURSE and SQUARE vowel sets occurring around [ɛː] or [œː] for many speakers. There is also a tendency among younger women in particular to merge NEAR and SQUARE at the value of [ɜː].
- In older Brummie accents, the CURE vowel has pronunciations varying between [ʊə~ʊæ̞~ɜʊæ̞], ranging from the least to the most broad.
  - The FORCE and CURE sets had [ɔː, uə] respectively, where the words paw, pour, poor would be said as [pɔː, pʌʊə, puːə] respectively. In more modern accents, there has been a shift towards a monophthongal realisation for both sets, leading to all three being pronounced as [pɔː]. The final element of the vowel is a lengthened [əː] before the morphemic suffixes -ed or -es and absent before the suffix -ing.
- DRESS is centralized and raised [ɛ̝~e̞].
- Word-final LETTER is typically more fronted compared to RP ([æ̞~ɛ]), although more middle-class speakers have an RP-influenced [ə].
  - When preceding the morphemic suffixes -ed or -es, it is a lengthened schwa [əː] similar to the CURE vowel. Compare batter [ˈbæ̞tæ̞] with battered [ˈbæ̞təːd].
- The PALM/START vowel is similar to RP, a long open back [ɑː]. Historically, in rural Warwickshire surrounding counties, [ɔː] also existed, approximating the THOUGHT/NORTH vowel of modern Brummie.
- TRAP, typical of northern English varieties, is a slightly lowered [æ̞], although it not as low as Scouse or Geordie [a̝], but is still distinct from to southern pronunciations such as RP [æ]. This highlights Birmingham's transitional nature between North and South England.
  - Due to Birmingham being in a transitional area, the trap-bath split is a complex issue. It is typically absent in most speakers although some variation is noted. Many Brummies generally pronounce aunt, half and laugh(-ter) with the lengthened BATH vowel, contrasting with words such as last, although older speakers may also use TRAP in these circumstances. Thorne (2003) notes one speaker who produced both the northern and southern variants of the word ask within the same sentence. This in turn creates social stigma, where the TRAP vowel is often looked down upon such as the placename Edgbaston (see #Phonemic incidence below).

==== Diphthongs ====
Diphthongs of Brummie
Closing	Centring
ʌɪ	(ɪə)
(oɪ)	(ʊə)
ɒɪ	
æʊ	
ʌʊ	

- FACE has a more open onset, yielding [ʌɪ] or [æɪ], similar to Cockney. This contrasts with the neighbouring Black Country, where it is often realized as [eɪ] or [aɪ].
- PRICE and CHOICE are merged in the broadest accents. Confusingly, the merger reported by Thorne (2003) for the city of Birmingham works the other way round compared to typical patterns, with both diphthongs merging at [ɔɪ]; thus line and loin are both realized the same ([lɔɪn]). Additionally, older speakers at the local end of the speech continuum frequently use a long monophthong [aː] or [ɑː] for the PRICE vowel.
- Wells (1982) states that the offset of the MOUTH vowel can sometimes be reduced as in [æə]. Thorne (2003) suggests the onset is slightly less open compared to other dialects, rendering [ɛʊ]. For those who merge this vowel with GOOSE, the vowel's onset is also realized further back, as [ɜʊ].
- The GOAT vowel is typically [ʌʊ].
- Realisation of SQUARE is monophthongized and centralised [ɜː], which contrasts with southern British accents.

=== Phonemic incidence ===
Birmingham has lexical peculiarities when it comes to pronunciation, usually retained by older speakers. Note that there are a handful of words that are pronounced in a non-standard way (e.g. baby /ˈbæbəi/) but are considered distinct dialectal words ('babby') in their own right; see #Lexicon below.

- Ad-, con-, ex- when unstressed are pronounced with their reduced forms (/əd-/, /kən-/, /əks-/), contrasting with the full forms (/ad-/, /kɒn-/, /ɛks-/) found in most areas north of Birmingham.
- Been and seen is generally shortened to /bɪn, sɪn/, being homophonous to bin and sin respectively.
- Bus is pronounced with a final voiced consonant (/bʊz/) without exception, making it homophonous to buzz.
- Get can be pronounced as /ɡɪt/.
- Girl varies in pronunciation between /ɡal ~ ɡɛl/.
- Guernsey, meaning a woollen sweater, can have the first vowel be pronounced with /a/.
- Home is /ʊm/ by older speakers.
- Hoof, roof, spoon are pronounced with the long vowel /huːf, ɾuːf, spuːn/, unlike the typical northern /hʊf, ɾʊf, spʊn/.
- One is pronounced as /wɒn/, which contrasts with won (verb) /wʊn/. This can be found in other varieties of British English as well.
- Tooth is pronounced /tuːθ~tʊθ/, ranging from the 'educated' south to the 'vulgar' north respectively; this exhibits Birmingham's transitional area between the southern and northern dialects.
- Was has pronunciations varying from /wɒz~wʌz~wʊz/.
- Week is shortened as /wɪk/, homophonous to wick and creating a minimal pair with weak (adjective) /wiːk/.
- Worse/worst is typically pronounced as /wʊs(t)/.
  - Likewise, older Brummies will also pronounce first as /fʊst/.

Shibboleths also exist which distinguish people from different districts or social classes:

- Edgbaston: A middle-class district, the vowel in second syllable is pronounced by locals and other middle-class speakers as /ɑː/ or /ə/. The working class pronounce it as /æ/, signifying that those speakers cannot live there.
- Solihull: Middle-class speakers pronounce the first vowel as GOAT, whereas working-class speech use LOT.

=== Phonological processes ===
- Nasalization is heavily exaggerated and stigmatized. Nasality in Brummie is often stronger than in the RP variety; whereas in RP a vowel can only be nasalized before a nasal consonant (i.e. /m, n, ŋ/), Brummie can also nasalize vowels after the aforementioned consonants and even independently in the strongest accents. This realization is often compared to other regional dialects, for example, singer is rendered as [ˈsɪ̝̃ŋɡæ], but compare also Nick [nɪ̝̃k] and kick [kɪ̝̃k].
  - This is caused by the dialect's preferred "articulatory setting", where the pharynx is kept quite tight and the tongue is pushed higher and further back than in other British English dialects.
- Assimilation is highly prevalent in connected speech, with anticipatory, progressive and coalescent assimilation all occurring frequently.
- Elision of consonants commonly occurs in consonant clusters (e.g., backwards realized as [ˈbækədz] or forwards as [ˈfɒɹədz]). This process also frequently extends to the loss of weak vowels in unstressed syllables (such as police becoming [ˈpliːs] or Saturday becoming [ˈsæʔdɜi]).
- As with other English varieties, prepositions regularly take weak forms, especially before word-initial consonants (e.g., of becoming [ə] or [ɒ], and to becoming [tə]).

=== Prosody ===
The intonation and prosody of Birmingham English are highly distinctive and serve as primary markers of the dialect.

- There is a strong relationship between vowel quality and intonation, meaning that intonational dips and rises frequently affect vowel sounds and vice versa. This vowel quality is most noticeably affected at the ends of speech acts.
- Unstressed syllables possess greater tonic variation than in standardized varieties of English. Furthermore, unstressed syllables tend to fall more than stressed syllables, whereas stressed syllables generally tend to rise more than unstressed syllables.
- Variation in tonic movement is much more prominent at the beginning and end of speech acts than in the middle.
- West Midlands speech characteristically features "terminal raising" in statements, meaning the pitch rises at the end of an utterance rather than falling.
- Negative verbs (such as wasn't or weren't) often take a markedly high intonational tone.
- Birmingham intonation shows a strong preference for "rise-plateau" and "rise-plateau-slump" pitch movements. This typically involves a jump-up in pitch on the unaccented syllable immediately following the nuclear syllable, which is then maintained on succeeding unaccented syllables, though the last one or two syllables may decline slightly.

== Vocabulary ==
Brummie features a wide range of traditional words and expressions, reflecting "a dialectal hybrid northern, southern, Midlands, Warwickshire, Staffordshire and Worcestershire speech". It also incorporates influences from its multicultural population, drawing on elements from the languages and dialects of Asian and Afro-Caribbean communities.

Traditional expressions used in Brummie speech include:

babby
An older pronunciation of baby, more common in the west of Birmingham.
bab
A diminutive form of babby, similar to babe, as seen in a Birmingham Mail headline "Don't call me bab!".
bawl, bawlin'
To weep, as in "she started to bawl"; also common in other parts of England, Canada, Australia and South Africa.
blart
To weep or cry; related to the verb bleat.
bostin
Used by all generations to refer to anything positive ('great' or 'awesome'); derived from the verb boast.
bottler
A popular and enjoyable song.
boughten
Something purchased rather than homemade, as in "Gi'us some boughten bread"; used mainly by older speakers.
cob
A crusty bread roll; from the idea that bread rolls resemble street cobbles and may be as hard as one.
cob on
A bad mood, usually in the phrase "got a cob on".
fock
A milder and more nuanced version of the swear word fuck.
gal, gel
Eye dialect spellings of girl.
gambol
A forward roll; used throughout the West Midlands.
go and play up one's own end
Said to children from a different street who are making a nuisance of themselves. This phrase is the title of the autobiographical book and musical play about the Birmingham childhood of radio presenter and entertainer Malcolm Stent.
have the brassen skimmer rubbed over one's face
Referring to someone impertinent or audacious, as in "'Er's 'ad the brassen skimmer rubbed over 'er face, 'er 'as".
island
A West Midlands term for a roundabout.
kid
Used to refer to siblings; also common in the north of England. Can be prefixed with 'our' or 'me', as in "Our kid fell off his bike".
mek, med
To 'make' and 'made' (past tense of 'make').
miskin
A dustbin or rubbish bin.
mom
A common variation of mum; also common in the United States, Canada, South Africa and elsewhere.
mooch
To look around, often referring to shops.
outdoor
An off-licence; used exclusively in the West Midlands.
pop
A carbonated drink, as in "Do you want a glass of pop?"; common in other parts of Great Britain, Canada and parts of the United States.
rocks
Boiled sweets or other hard sweets.
scrage
A scratched cut where skin is sliced off; as a verb: "I fell over and badly scraged my knee".
snap
Food or a meal; also "bite of snap". Allegedly derived from the act of eating itself, as in "I'm off to get my snap" (meaning "I'm leaving to get my dinner"). May also refer to a lunch tin or 'snap tin', as taken down the pit by miners.
suff
A drain, as in "put it down the suff".
roll, bap
A soft bread roll, in contrast to a hard cob.
throw a wobbly
To become sulky or have a tantrum; also common in England, Australia and South Africa.
trap
To leave suddenly or flee.
up the cut
Up the canal; not unique to Birmingham.
wench
An affectionate term for one's sister, also used by husbands referring to their wives; from a 16th- and 17th-century word meaning 'young woman'. Similar to kid, it can be prefixed with 'our' or 'me'.
yampy
Mad, daft or barmy. Many from the Black Country believe yampy originates from the Dudley-Tipton area, with the word also being appropriated by speakers of Birmingham and Coventry dialects. However, the word is found in areas of the Black Country outside Birmingham and Tipton/Dudley, including south Staffordshire and north Worcestershire; therefore, the term might have originated throughout a more general area than is popularly thought.

== Notable speakers ==
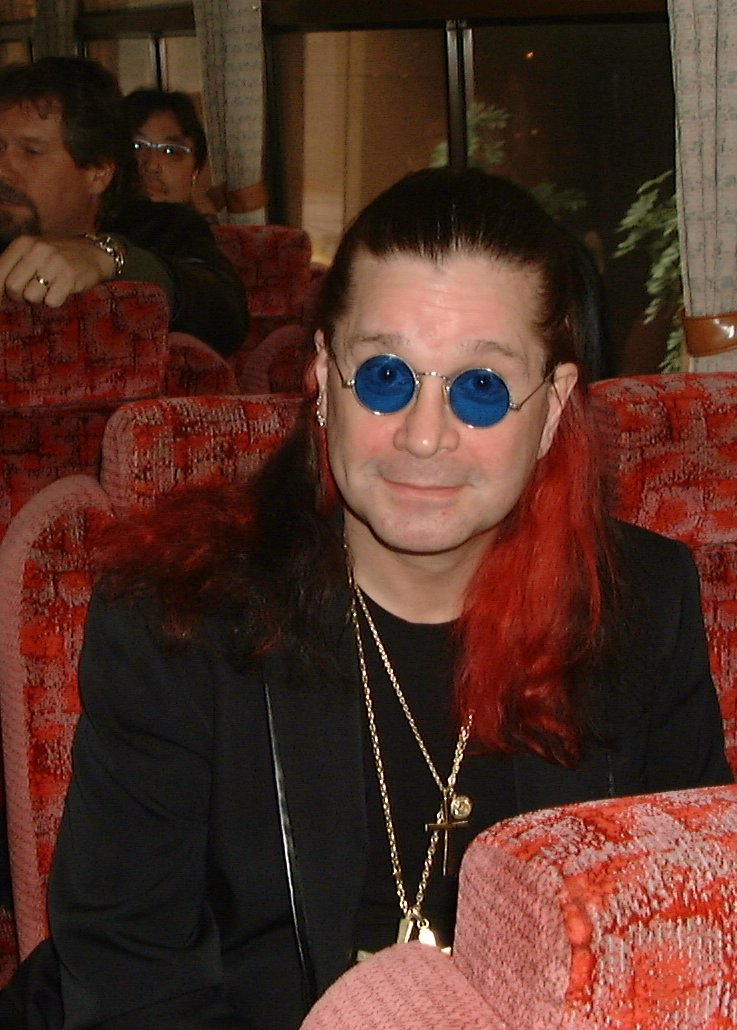
Ozzy Osbourne was known for his Brummie accent.

Examples of speakers of the Brummie dialect include TV presenter Adrian Chiles, singer/musician Christine McVie, comedian Jasper Carrott, Goodies actor and TV presenter Bill Oddie, hip-hop and garage musician Mike Skinner, rock musicians Ozzy Osbourne, Tony Iommi, Geezer Butler, Bill Ward (all members of the original Black Sabbath), Roy Wood, Jeff Lynne (ELO founders), and Dave Pegg (of Fairport Convention and Jethro Tull), broadcaster Les Ross, politicians Clare Short and Jess Phillips, SAS soldier and author John "Brummie" Stokes, TV presenter Alison Hammond, internet meme Danny G, and many actresses and actors, including Martha Howe-Douglas, Donnaleigh Bailey, Nicolas Woodman, Julie Walters, Cat Deeley, Sarah Smart, Felicity Jones, footballer Jack Grealish, TV presenter and Top Gear/Grand Tour-host Richard Hammond and Ryan Cartwright.

== See also ==
- Black Country dialect
- Potteries dialect (North Staffordshire)

== Bibliography ==
- Beal, Joan (2004), "English dialects in the North of England: morphology and syntax", in Schneider, Edgar W.; Burridge, Kate; Kortmann, Bernd; Mesthrie, Rajend; Upton, Clive (eds.), A handbook of varieties of English, vol. 2: Morphology and Syntax, Mouton de Gruyter, pp. 114–141, ISBN 3-11-017532-0
- Clark, Urszula (2004), "The English West Midlands: phonology", in Schneider, Edgar W.; Burridge, Kate; Kortmann, Bernd; Mesthrie, Rajend; Upton, Clive (eds.), A handbook of varieties of English, vol. 1: Phonology, Mouton de Gruyter, pp. 134–162, ISBN 3-11-017532-0
- Clark, Urszula (2013), West Midlands English: Birmingham and the Black Country, Edinburgh University Press, ISBN 978-0748685806
- Elmes, Simon (2006), Talking for Britain: a journey through the voices of a nation, Penguin, ISBN 9780141022772
- Gimson, Alfred Charles (2014), Cruttenden, Alan (ed.), Gimson's Pronunciation of English (8th ed.), Routledge, ISBN 9781444183092
- Thorne, Stephen (2003), Birmingham English: A Sociolinguistic Study (Ph.D), University of Birmingham, OCLC 500294648
- Wells, John C. (1982), Accents of English, Vol. 2: The British Isles (pp. i–xx, 279–466), Cambridge University Press, doi:10.1017/CBO9780511611759, ISBN 0-52128540-2
