= Black Country dialect =

English dialect

- Native to: United Kingdom
- Region: Black Country
- Language family: Indo-European: Germanic; West Germanic; Ingvaeonic; Anglo Frisian; Anglic; English; British English; West Midlands English; Black Country dialect
- Early forms: Old English (Mercian): Middle English; Early Modern English

Language codes
- ISO 639-3: –
- Glottolog: None

Speech example
An example of a male speaker from West Bromwich (Frank Skinner).

The Black Country dialect is spoken by many people in the Black Country, a region covering most of the four Metropolitan Boroughs of Dudley, Sandwell, Walsall and Wolverhampton. The traditional dialect preserves many archaic traits of Early Modern English and even Middle English and may be unintelligible for outsiders. This dialect is distinct from and maintains more traditional characteristics than the dialect of Birmingham, which has been more influenced by standard English due to having been urban for a longer time. It has also influenced the accents of the towns and villages in the counties to the north, south and west of the region.

== Phonology ==
In general, the Black Country dialect has resisted many of the changes from Middle English that are seen in other dialects of British English, resembling particularly Northern English and West Country English.

- There is no trap-bath split, so there is no /ɑː/ in words like bath, grass, etc., so to rhyme with math(s), gas, etc.
- Like most British accents (except Received Pronunciation), there are glottal stops.
- /æ/ is uniformly pronounced as [a].
- There is no foot-strut split, so that cut rhymes with put, and both use either /ʊ/ or /ɤ/.
- There is no NG-coalescence, so singer rhymes with finger, with both commonly pronounced with [ŋg~ŋk]. Indeed, the accent can be analysed as lacking the phoneme /ŋ/ with that sound instead being regarded as an allophone of /n/.
- The Black Country accent is non-rhotic, and draw and drawer are nearly homophones.
- Final unstressed vowels are further reduced, such as /wɪndə/ for window and /fə/ for far.
- Final fricative consonants can be voiced and so /s/ is pronounced as [z] and /f/ as [v], for example, bus is pronounced buzz.
- The LOT vowel is typically realised as being [ɒ], but is also commonly realised as an unrounded [ä].
- Many <-ook> words, such as 'book', may keep the historic pronunciation of [uː].
- The FACE vowel is realised as [æɪ].

The general intonation exhibits notable similarities to that of the West Country dialects, characterised by a distinctive undulating contour. However, this contrasts with the Brummie dialect, where intonation is generally monotonous, often descending in tone towards the end of sentences.

Vowel Table
Lexical set	Realization	Notes
FLEECE	iː~ɪi~əi	
NAER	iə	
DRESS	ɛ	
SQUARE	ɛː	
FACE	æi~ɛi	
TRAP	æ~æː	
BATH	æ~a	
PALM	ɑː	
START	ɑː	
LOT	ɒ~ɔ	
CLOTH	ɒ~ɔ	
THOUGHT	ɔː	
NORTH	ɔː	
FORCE	ɔː	
GOAT	aʊ~ɔʊ	
FOOT	ʊ	
GOOSE	uː	
CURE	juːə~jɔː	
PRICE	ai~ɑi~ɔi	
CHOICE	ɔi	
MOUTH	æu~ɛu	
lettER	ɛ~ə	
NURSE	ə̝~ə̟	
STRUT	ɒ~ʊ~ə	
KIT	i	
happY	i	
horsES	i	
commA	ə	

== Grammar ==
Pronouns thee, thy and thou are still in use, as is the case in parts of Derbyshire, Yorkshire and Lancashire. "'Ow B'ist," meaning "How are you?" is a greeting contracted from "How be-est thou?" with the typical answer being "'Bay too bah," ("I be not too bad"), meaning "I am not too bad." "I haven't seen her" becomes "I ay sid 'er." and "I have seen her" becomes "o sid 'er". Black Country dialect often uses "ar" where other parts of England use "yes" such as " o ar" for "oh yes" (this is common as far away as Yorkshire). Similarly, the local version of "you" "yo" is pronounced /joʊ/, rhyming with "so."

Among older speakers, ye is used for you, as it is in most northern parts of England and Scotland. It is also common for older speakers to say "Her" instead of "She" ("'Er day, did 'ah?", meaning "She didn't, did she?"). The local pronunciation "goo" (elsewhere "go") or "gewin'" (going) is similar to that elsewhere in the Midlands. It is quite common for broad Black Country speakers to say "agooin'" where others say "going". This is found in the greeting "Ow b'ist gooin?" (“How are you?", "How’s it going?”), to which a typical response would be "Bostin, ah kid" ("Very well, our kid"). Although the term yam yam may come from ya'm (you am), ya/ye is an archaic form of you and in many areas ye (pronounced like yea or ya) is used: "Owamya, aer kid? — Ar ah'm owkay, ta."

== Vocabulary ==
- "Orroight" = "Alright"
  - Used as a questioning greeting, short for "Am yow orroight?"
- "Yow" = "You"
- "Yam" = "You are"
  - From "Yow am" or "Yowm".
  - This is the origin of "Yam Yams", a term designated by "Brummies" for the people from Wolverhampton who use this expression.
- "Am" = "Are"
- "Ar" = "Yes"
- "Arm" = "I'm"
- "Bin" = "Been", "Are" or "Am"
- "Bay" = "Not"
- "Dow" = "Doesn't"
- "Day" = "Didn't"
- "Her/'Er" = "She"
- "Cowin" = "Extremely"
- "Frenchy"= "Any coloured butterfly other than white"
- "Gewin/Gooin" = "Going"
- "Thay" = "They"
- "Oss" = "Horse"
- "Tekkin" = "Taking"
- "Cut" = "Canal"
- "Ay/Ayn" = "Ain't"
- "Ova" = "Over"
- "Cud" = "Could"
- "Cor/Car" = "Cannot"
- "Wammal" or "Scrammel" = "Dog" – specifically a mongrel
- "Warra" = "What a"
- "Worrow" = "Hello"
- "Wossant" or "War/Wor" = "Wasn't"
  - E.g. "It wor me"
- "Blartin" = "Crying"
- "Babbie/Babby" = "Baby"
- "Me/Mar" = "My"
- "Kaylied" = "Drunk"
- "Arl" = "I'll"
- "Doe" = "Don't"
- "Tat" = "Junk"
- "Tattin" = "Collecting scrap metal"
- "Tatter" = "Scrap collector"
- "Werk" = "Work"
- "Loff/Laff" = "Laugh"
- "Yed" = "Head"
- "Jed" = "Dead"
- "Tar" = "Thanks
- "Ah'm" = "I'm"
- "Aer Kid" or "Kidda" = A young relative, sibling, or friend
- "Arr" = "Yes"
- "Nah" = "No"
- "Saft" = "Stupid"
- "Summat" = "Something"
- "Mekkin" = "Making"
- "Med" = "Made"
- "Sayin" = "Saying"
- "Wench" = "Girlfriend" or "Girl"
- "Missis" = "Wife"
- "Bostin" = "Brilliant, wonderful"

+ "Fizzog" = "face" + "Lamp" = "to hit or beat" + "Opple" = "apple" + "donnies" = "hands"

The neighbouring city of Birmingham may be called "Brum-a-jum" (Birmingham's colloquial name is Brummagem, a corruption of its older name of Bromwicham and hence West Bromwich) or Birminam (missing the "g" and "h" out and saying it the way it is spelt). Natives of Birmingham (Brummies) meanwhile often refer to their Black Country neighbours as "Yam Yams", a reference to the use of "yow am" instead of "you are". However, it is unlikely "yam yam" comes from "yow'm", as the sound is totally different; it is more likely from ye (archaic form of you), as in yer'm, which when said quickly sounds like yam, as in "yam gooin daft" meaning "you're going silly", or "doe be daft" meaning "don't be silly". Combination words as in "shutyarow up" ("shut your row up", meaning "be quiet") can seem hard to understand and can even sound like "shutchowrow up". The blendings are to be thought of as products of Black Country pronunciation, not separate dialectal words.

== In popular culture ==
A road sign containing local dialect was placed at the A461/A459/A4037 junction in 1997 before the construction of a traffic island on the site. The sign read, If yowm saft enuff ter cum dahn 'ere agooin wum, yowr tay ull be spile't!!, which means, "If you're soft [stupid] enough to come down here on your way home, your tea will be spoilt".

In 2008, an internet video, The Black Country Alphabet, described the whole alphabet in Black Country dialect, boosting the dialect's perception.

== Authentic recordings ==
The Survey of English Dialects recorded several traditional dialects from in and around the Black Country, which can be heard on the British Library Sound Archive website.

- G. Brooke (born 1888), market gardener from Himley, Staffordshire in the Black Country.
- Snead, Ted (born 1881), retired farm labourer from Hilton, Shropshire, a few miles west of the Black Country.
- William Wagstaffe (born 1876), retired labourer and smallholder from Romsley, Worcestershire, a few miles south of the Black Country.
