= England's Gazetteer =

England's Gazetteer, or, an accurate description of all the cities, towns, and villages of the kingdom was a large road atlas printed in the mid 18th century. The Gazetteer was written by Stephen Whatley (1712–1741) and was published in three separate editions, each of which offered maps of the roads of England and Wales. Editions 1 and 2 included a dictionary of the cities, corporations, market towns, and the most-noted villages. Edition 3 went further, including an alphabetical register of the less noted villages with their distance, or bearing, from the next market town or well known place. In London, it was published by J. and P. Knapton, D. Browne, A. Millar, J. Whiston and B. White.
