= Joseph Masters =

New Zealand cooper, community leader, farmer, politician, writer

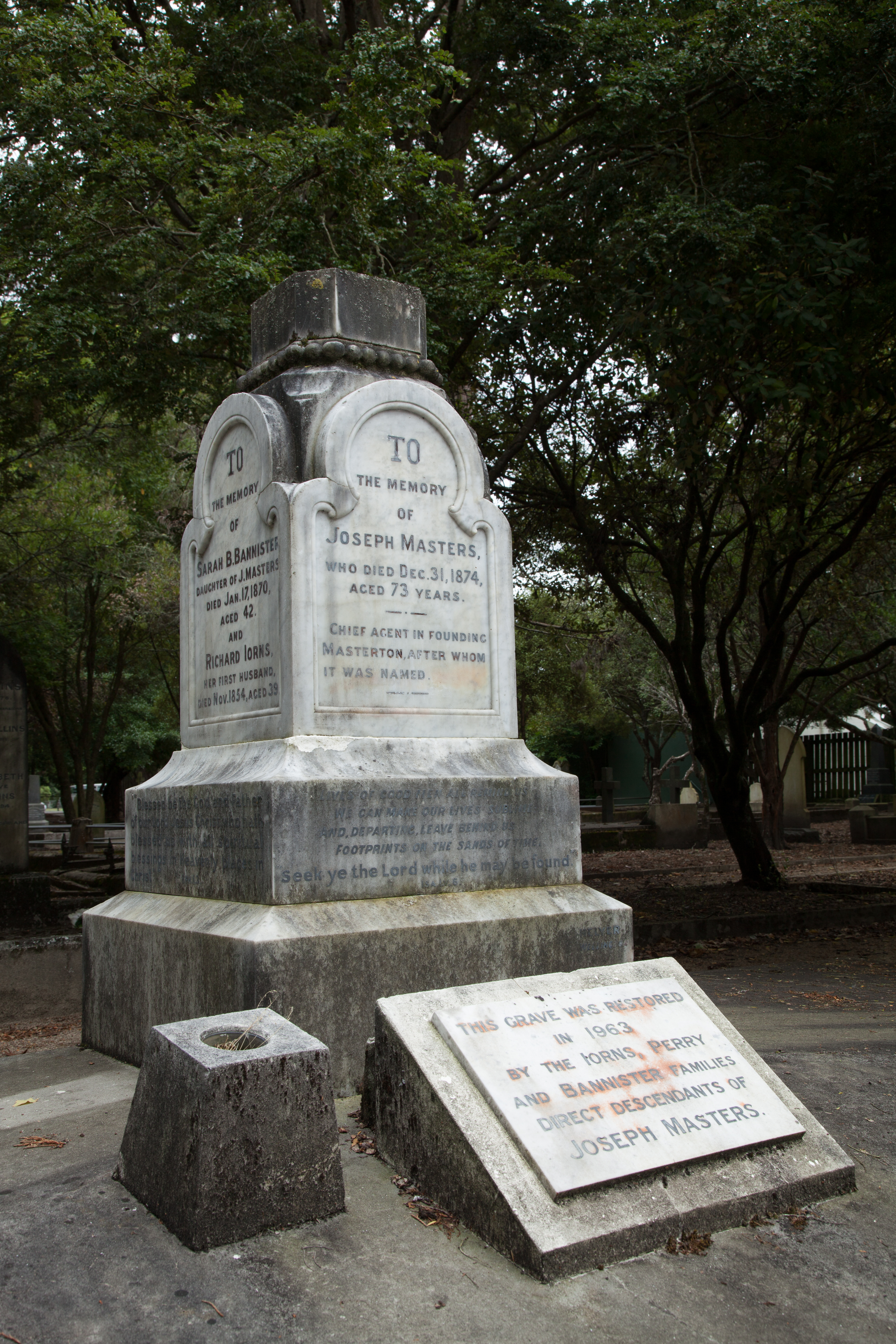
Joseph Masters grave site

Joseph Masters (1802 – 21 December 1873) was a New Zealand cooper, community leader, farmer, politician, and writer. Born in Derby, Derbyshire, England, he is the namesake of Masterton, New Zealand. He had three daughters, including one named Mary-Ann.

== Early life and career ==
Masters' father died when he was young, prompting him to work in a silk mill, threading bobbins. He later lived with his uncle in Rugby, where he served an apprenticeship as a cooper. Eager to improve himself, Masters served as a Grenadier Guard, a policeman, and a jailer. In 1826, he married Sarah Bourton.

== Migration to Australia and New Zealand ==
In 1832, Masters, his wife, and two daughters migrated to Tasmania. There, he initially worked as a cooper in the whaling industry and subsequently as a jailer at Oatlands. Masters continued seeking self-improvement and left for New Zealand via Sydney in 1841. He arrived in the Bay of Islands before relocating to Wellington, where he initially started a ginger beer manufacturing business. However, by the mid-1840s, he returned to working as a cooper in Lambton Quay.

== Small Farms Association and settlement in Wairarapa ==
Masters advocated for small farm settlements, proposing that groups of working men should pool their resources to purchase blocks of land from the government and subdivide them. Each member would own a small town section and a 40-acre farm. In March 1853, the Small Farms Association was established. Masters and C.R. Carter convinced Governor Grey to support their settlement in Wairarapa, contingent on securing land sales from local Māori. Masters and H.H. Jackson met with Retimana Te Korou at Ngaumutawa pā. Te Korou agreed to the settlers' presence near his village after consulting with his family. His son-in-law, Ihaiah Whakamairu, accompanied the small farm proponents to Wellington to arrange the sale.

== Masterton settlement ==
Masters did not join the first group of small farmers that arrived on 2 May 1854; he arrived shortly after. He vigorously pursued opportunities for himself and his family, successfully farming his lands and representing the area in the Wellington Provincial Council. Masters was a staunch advocate of the Trust Lands Trust and had a significant influence on the Masterton community, which he guarded until his death on 21 December 1873 at his residence near Masterton.
