= A Grammar of the Dialect of the Bolton Area =

Book on English dialectology

A Grammar of the Dialect of the Bolton Area is a two-part dialectological book written by Graham Shorrocks, a professor at the Memorial University of Newfoundland, based on a series of research projects in the 1970s and 1980s. From 1972 to 1974 Shorrocks did fieldwork in his hometown of Farnworth supported by a grant from the University of Sheffield. He later undertook further fieldwork in other parts of the Bolton metropolitan borough in the 1980s. Part 1 was published in 1998, and Part 2 in 1999. The book argues that grammatical variation amongst dialects of English has been underestimated. In the preface, the author says that the account of the morphology and syntax is "probably more detailed than the grammatical component in any other monograph devoted to a British English dialect".

Shorrocks's technique was to get to know his informants well so that they would speak to him naturally, as they would with their friends and families. As he recorded his conversations, he felt that this was necessary to avoid their modifying their speech under the pressure of being recorded. The tapes were deposited at the National Centre for English Cultural Tradition in Sheffield. Shorrocks was very critical of sociolinguistic techniques, which he felt relied excessively on questionnaires and were particularly unsuitable for revealing the grammatical features that can only be recorded in flowing speech.

Shorrocks concluded that the extent of decline in traditional dialect presented by many sociolinguists was exaggerated, and that all the grammatical features of the Bolton dialect found by the early dialectologist Joseph Wright were still present at the time of his research in addition to a few features that Wright had not recorded.

Shorrocks stated that the dialect of Bolton, and Greater Manchester in general, has been highly stigmatised.

A great many people in the area feel ashamed of their speech - to a degree that goes beyond what is generally appreciated. I have personally known those who would avoid, or could never enjoy, a conversation with a stranger, because they were literally too ashamed to open their mouths. It has been drummed into people - often in school, and certainly in society at large - that dialect speech is incorrect, impure, vulgar, clumsy, ugly, careless, shoddy, ignorant, and altogether inferior. Furthermore, the particularly close link in recent English society between speech, especially accents, and social class and values has made local dialect a hindrance to upward social mobility.

The concept of a "Northern Regional Standard", which Shorrocks attributes to the Sheffield University dialectologist John Widdowson, is used to describe modifications made by dialect speakers when not speaking with acquaintances. Shorrocks notes that the number of speakers of Received Pronunciation in the Bolton area is very small, which restricts its influence on the base dialect.

The phonemes described for the Bolton dialect are shown in the table below. /h/ is shown as a marginal phoneme in the dialect, used only when stressing words or attempting to modify speech towards a standard form, and /x/ is shown as a phoneme that existed in the dialect until the mid-20th century as a pronunciation of the sequence gh. There is no phoneme /ŋ/ in the Bolton dialect, although [ŋ] occurs as an allophone of /n/ before /k, g/.

Group	Phonemes in Bolton
Long vowels	i: ʏ: e: ɛ: æ: ɔ: o: ɵ:
Short vowels	ɪ ɛ a ɔ ʊ ɵ
Diphthongs	ɛɪ aɪ ɔɪ ɜʏ ɪɵ ɔɵ oɵ ʏɵ
Consonants	p b t d k g t͡ʃ d͡ʒ f v θ ð s z ʃ ʒ m n l w r j [h] [x]

The books were given positive reviews in the Transactions of the Yorkshire Dialect Society by Stanley Ellis: the first book reviewed in the 1998 edition and the second book reviewed in the 1999 edition.

Graham Shorrocks died in 2023.

== Publication details ==
- Shorrocks, Graham (1998). A Grammar of the Dialect of the Bolton Area. Pt. 1: Phonology. Bamberger Beiträge zur englischen Sprachwissenschaft; Bd. 41. Frankfurt am Main: Peter Lang. ISBN 3-631-33066-9.
- Shorrocks, Graham (1999). A Grammar of the Dialect of the Bolton Area. Pt. 2: Morphology and Syntax. Bamberger Beiträge zur englischen Sprachwissenschaft; Bd. 41. Frankfurt am Main: Peter Lang. ISBN 3-631-33066-9.
