= West Midlands English =

Dialect spoken in the West Midlands, England

- Native to: England
- Region: West Midlands
- Ethnicity: English
- Language family: Indo-European: Germanic; West Germanic; Ingvaeonic; Anglo-Frisian; Anglic; English; British English; West Midlands English
- Early forms: Old English: Middle English; Early Modern English
- Dialects: Black Country; Brummie; Coventry; Potteries

Language codes
- ISO 639-3: –
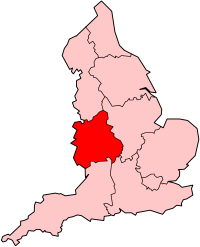
- Location of The West Midlands within England

West Midlands English is a group of dialects of the English language spoken in the West Midlands of England and surrounding areas. The dialects vary across the region and include Brummie, spoken in Birmingham, the Black Country dialect, and varieties associated with Coventry, Stoke-on-Trent, Shropshire, Herefordshire, Worcestershire and Warwickshire.

West Midlands dialects share several phonological features with Northern English, including the general absence of the TRAP–BATH split and, in many areas, the FOOT–STRUT split. Other features include H-dropping and the retention of the ⟨g⟩ sound in words ending in -ing. Pronunciation varies geographically, with some varieties in the western and southern parts of the region sharing features with West Country English or accents of southern England.

== County accents ==
Certain areas of the West Midlands are stereotyped as having stronger accents than others, Dudley in the Black Country being an example. There are some phrases used locally in the Black Country that are rather well-known. People there tend to say 'arr' for 'yes'. Many words are shortened, with the most common shortening being "I haven't" to "I ay" (which can be argued to be a shorter form of the contraction 'I ain't'). In the south of the West Midlands (southern Warwickshire and Worcestershire), the accent is more similar to the general southern accent.

Dave Bradley, a presenter on BBC Hereford and Worcester said in 2005 that:

[in Herefordshire and Worcestershire] we have many different ways of speaking the English language, at least I think that's what we are speaking!

Go from Kington in North Herefordshire with the Welsh-border lilt, to Evesham in the south of Worcestershire where there's a very different sound.

From Kidderminster and the North Worcestershire area where many, but not all, have a Brummagem twang, and then off down to Ross where there's a hint of the rounded Gloucestershire tones.

— Dave Bradley

== Phonology ==
- West Midlands accents do not have the TRAP–BATH split much like Northern England English, so cast is pronounced [kast] rather than the [kɑːst] pronunciation of most southern accents. The northern limit of the [ɑː] in many words crosses England from mid-Shropshire to The Wash, passing just south of Birmingham.
- Much like Northern England English as well, there is no foot–strut split in the West Midlands, except for Herefordshire and most of Shropshire, with words containing [ʌ] like strut or but being pronounced with [ʊ], without any distinction between putt and put. This is often realised as [ɤ] in the Birmingham and Coventry areas, though the more sterotypically northern [ʊ] is found from Nuneaton northwards.
- Some lexical sets in Standard English do not correlate exactly with the West Midlands dialect. A few commonly used words in Standard English's GOAT set have retained an older, pre toe-tow merger quality of [ʊw], which forms a separate lexical set along with some vowels in the Standard English GOOSE set which are immediately followed by an /l/. For examples, going and rowing do not rhyme in the West Midlands dialect, being pronounced as [gʊwɪŋg] and [rɐwɪŋg] respectively, and crew and cruel are not minimal pairs as their vowels differ - [kɹɵɥ] and [kɹʊwɫ] respectively.
- H-dropping is common, in which the [h] sound is usually omitted from most words.
- There is no NG-coalescence. Cases of the spelling -ing are pronounced as [ɪŋɡ] rather than [ɪŋ]. Wells noted that there were no exceptions to this rule in Stoke-on-Trent, whereas there were for other areas with the [ɪŋɡ] pronunciation, such as Liverpool.
- Dialect verbs are used, for example am for are, ay for is not (related to ain't), bay for are not, bin for am or, emphatically, for are. Hence the following joke dialogue about bay windows: "What sort of windas am them?" "They'm bay windas." "Well if they bay windas wot bin them?". There is also humour to be derived from the shop-owner's sign of Mr. "E. A. Wright" (that is, "He ay [isn't] right," a phrase implying someone is saft [soft] in the jed [head]). Saft also may mean silly as in, "Stop bein' so saft".
- The Birmingham and Coventry accents are distinct, even though the cities are only 19 miles/30 km apart, Coventry being closer to an East Midlands accent.
- Around Stoke-on-Trent, the short i can sometimes sound rather like ee, as very obvious when hearing a local say it; however, this is not always the case as most other words such as "miss" or "tip" are still pronounced as normal. The Potteries accent is perhaps the most distinctly 'northern' of the West Midlands accents, given that the urban area around Stoke-on-Trent is close to the Cheshire border.
- Herefordshire and parts of Worcestershire and Shropshire have a rhotic accent, somewhat like the West Country, and in some parts of these counties, the local accent mixes features with the Welsh accent, particularly in places closer to the English–Welsh border.
- In Warwickshire, the northern towns like Nuneaton and Bedworth have a similar accent to Coventry – with the area in the far north of the county, around Atherstone, exhibiting many features of East Midlands English – while accents in the south of Warwickshire share certain traits with Southern England English, such as the TRAP–BATH split. In some parts of south-western Warwickshire (e.g. around Alcester), the accent bears similarities to those of neighbouring parts of rural Worcestershire and Gloucestershire, sometimes exhibiting rhoticity.
- Historically, and among some more traditional speech, there is a horse-hoarse distinction, with the vowel qualities being approximately [ɒː ~ ɔː] and [oə ~ ɤə ~ ʊə].

== Varieties of West Midlands English ==
- Black Country
- Brummie (spoken in Birmingham)
- Coventry
- Herefordshire (West Country accent)
- Cannock / Norton Canes / Brownhills (South Staffordshire)
- Potteries (North Staffordshire)
- Salopian (Shropshire)
- Warwickshire
- Worcestershire
