= Regional accents of English =

Spoken English shows great variation across regions where it is the predominant language. Both the United Kingdom and the United States have a wide variety of accents, and no single "British accent" or "American accent" exists. This article provides an overview of the numerous identifiable variations in pronunciation of English, which shows various regional accents of the English language. Such distinctions usually derive from the phonetic inventory of local dialects, as well as from broader differences in the Standard English of different primary-speaking populations.

Accent is the part of dialect concerning local pronunciation. Vocabulary and grammar are described elsewhere; see the list of dialects of the English language. Secondary English speakers tend to carry over the intonation and phonetics of their mother tongue in English speech. For more details on this, see non-native pronunciations of English.

Primary English speakers show great variability in terms of regional accents. Examples such as Pennsylvania Dutch English are easily identified by key characteristics, but others are more obscure or easily confused. Broad regions can possess subforms. For instance, towns located less than 10 miles (16 km) from the city of Manchester, such as Bolton, Oldham, Rochdale, and Salford each have distinct accents, all of which are grouped together under the broader Lancashire accent. These sub-dialects are very similar to each other, but non-local listeners can identify firm differences. On the other side of the spectrum, Australia has a General Australian accent which remains almost unchanged over thousands of miles.

English accents can differ enough to create room for misunderstandings. For example, the pronunciation of "pearl" in some variants of Scottish English can sound like the entirely unrelated word "petal" to an American. For a summary of the differences between accents, see Sound correspondences between English accents.

== Overview ==
Varieties of Standard English and their features
Phonological features	United States (United States)	Canada	Ireland (Republic of Ireland)	United Kingdom				South Africa (South Africa)	Australia	New Zealand (New Zealand)
Phonological features	United States (United States)	Canada	Ireland (Republic of Ireland)	Northern Ireland	Scotland	England	Wales	South Africa (South Africa)	Australia	New Zealand (New Zealand)
/æ/ rather than /ɑː/ in can't	Yes	Yes	Yes	Yes						
father–bother merger	Yes	Yes								
consistent intervocalic alveolar-flapping	Yes	Yes								
unrounded [ɑ] in pot	Yes	Yes	Yes							
syllabic [ɝ] in bird	Yes	Yes	Yes	Yes						
cot-caught merger	Variable	Yes		Yes	Yes					
FOOT–GOOSE merger				Yes	Yes					
trap-bath split			Variable			Variable (Note: Yes in Southern England, No in Northern England and most of the Midlands.)	Variable	Yes	Partial (Note: Yes before fricatives: /-f/, /-s/, /-θ/; Variable before nasals: /-mpəl/, /-nd/, /-nt/, /-ntʃ/, /-ns/.)	Yes
rhotic or non-rhotic	Mostly rhotic	Rhotic	Rhotic	Rhotic	Rhotic	Mostly non-rhotic	Non-rhotic	Non-rhotic	Non-rhotic	Non-rhotic
monophthongal /aɪ, aʊ/, close vowels for /æ, ɛ/								Yes	Mostly (Note: Many younger Australian English speakers have more open pronunciations.)	Yes
front [aː] for /ɑːr/			Yes			Variable	Variable		Yes	Yes

Dialects and open vowels
word	RP	GA	Can	sound change
THOUGHT	/ɔ/	/ɔ/	/ɑ/	cot–caught merger
CLOTH	/ɒ/	/ɔ/	/ɑ/	lot–cloth split
LOT	/ɒ/	/ɑ/	/ɑ/	father–bother merger
PALM	/ɑː/	/ɑ/	/ɑ/	father–bother merger
PLANT	/ɑː/	/æ/	/æ/	trap–bath split
BATH	/ɑː/	/æ/	/æ/	trap–bath split
TRAP	/a/	/æ/	/æ/	trap–bath split

English dialects differ greatly in their pronunciation of open vowels. In Received Pronunciation, there are four open back vowels, /a ɑː ɒ ɔː/, but in General American there are only three, /æ ɑ ɔ/, and in most dialects of Canadian English only two, /æ ɑ/. Which words have which vowel varies between dialects. Words like bath and cloth have the vowels /ɑː ɒ/ in Received Pronunciation, but /æ ɔ/ in General American. The table above shows some of these dialectal differences.

== Great Britain and Ireland ==
Accents and dialects vary widely across Great Britain, Ireland and nearby smaller islands. The UK has the most local accents of any English-speaking country. As such, a single "British accent" does not exist. Someone could be said to have an English, Scottish, Welsh, or Irish accent, although these all have many different subtypes.

=== England ===
==== Southern England ====
There are considerable variations within the accents of English across England, one of the most obvious being the trap–bath split of the southern half of the country.

Two main sets of accents are spoken in the West Country, namely Cornish and West Country, spoken primarily in the counties of Devon, Somerset, Gloucestershire, Bristol, Dorset (not as common in Dorset), and Wiltshire (again, less common in eastern Wiltshire). A range of variations can be heard within different parts of the West Country: The Bristolian dialect is distinctive from the accent heard in Gloucestershire (especially south of Cheltenham), for example.

The Cornish accent has an east–west variation, with the east of the county having influences from West Country English and the west of the county having direct influences from the Cornish language.

There is great variation within Greater London, with various accents such as Cockney, Estuary English, Multicultural London English, and Received Pronunciation being found all throughout the region and the Home Counties.

Other accents are those of

- the East Midlands (Derby, Leicester and Rutland, Lincoln, Northampton, and Nottingham)
- East Anglia (Norfolk, Suffolk, and Cambridgeshire)
- the Home Counties (typically Buckinghamshire, Essex, Hertfordshire, Berkshire, Surrey, Sussex, Kent, and Hampshire). The Essex accent has an east–west variation, with the county's west having Estuary English speech features and the county's east having the traditional Essaxon/East Anglian features.
- A range of accents are spoken in the West Midlands (in the major towns and conurbations (The Black Country, Birmingham, Coventry, Stoke-on-Trent (considered by many to have tones of Scouse), and Wolverhampton) and in rural areas (such as in Herefordshire and south Worcestershire).

In February 2019, the New York Times published a quiz that maps the geographical differences between British and Irish dialects.

==== Northern England ====
The accents of Northern England have a range of regional variations.

Cumbria has regional variants in Western Cumbria (Workington), Southern Cumbria (Barrow-in-Furness), and Carlisle.

Modern Northumbrian has local variants in Northern Northumberland (Berwick-upon-Tweed), Eastern Northumberland (Ashington) and Newcastle, Sunderland, and mid- and southern County Durham. A specialist dialect called Pitmatic is within this group, found across the region. It includes terms specific to coal mining.

Yorkshire is distinctive, having regional variants around Leeds, Bradford, Hull, Middlesbrough, Sheffield, and York. Although many Yorkshire accents sound similar, accents in areas around Hull and Middlesbrough are markedly different. Due to this, the Middlesbrough accent is sometimes grouped, with modern Northumbrian accents being a midway between the two regions.

The Hull accent's rhythm is more like that of northern Lincolnshire than that of the rural East Riding, perhaps due to migration from Lincolnshire to the city during its industrial growth. One feature that it shares with the surrounding rural area is that an /aɪ/ sound in the middle of a word often becomes an /ɑː/, for example, "five" may sound like "fahve", and "time" like "tahme"; this way of pronouncing the "i" sound (only when followed by a voiced consonant) is shared with the Middlesbrough accent, as is the distinctive pronunciation of words like 'work' ("wairk") or 'shirt' ("shairt").

Historic Lancashire, with regional variants in Bolton, Burnley, Blackburn, Manchester, Preston, Blackpool, Liverpool, and Wigan. Many of the Lancashire accents may sound similar to outsiders, with the exception of Manchester and Wigan, where an older dialect has been maintained.

The Liverpool accent, known as Scouse, is an exception to the Lancashire regional variant of English. It has spread to some of the surrounding towns. Before the 1840s, Liverpool's accent was similar to others in Lancashire, though with some distinct features due to the city's proximity to Wales. The city's population of around 60,000 was swelled in the 1840s by the arrival of around 300,000 Irish refugees escaping the Great Famine, as Liverpool was England's main Atlantic port and a popular departure point for people leaving for a new life in the United States. While many of the Irish refugees moved away, a vast number remained in Liverpool and permanently influenced the local accent.

=== Scotland ===
The regional accents of Scottish English generally draw on the phoneme inventory of the dialects of Modern Scots, a language spoken by around 30% of the Scottish population with characteristic vowel realisations due to the Scottish vowel length rule. Highland English accents are more strongly influenced by Scottish Gaelic than other forms of Scottish English.

=== Wales ===
The Welsh language (known as Cymraeg) heavily influences the use of English in Wales, which is characterised by unique grammatical conventions and a distinctive lexicon not found in other dialects of English. As in Welsh, the placement of the subject and the verb after the predicate allow the speaker to add greater emphasis at the start of a declaration, such as "Fed up, I am" or "Running on Friday, he is". In south Wales the use of the tag question "isn't it?" is common irrespective of the Subject–verb–object word order, while the word where in a question is often followed by the auxiliary "to", as in "Where to are we going?"

Aside from lexical borrowings from Welsh such as cwtch and eisteddfod (which are used consistently throughout Wales), colloquial English terms such as butty (Welsh: byti) and tidy are largely limited to the South Wales Valleys. Despite the varieties of English spoken in Wales, the features of English in the South Wales valleys are commonly recognisable as "Welsh English" to people from the rest of the UK.

The Cardiff dialect and accent is quite distinctive from that of the South Wales Valleys, primarily:

- Rounding of the second element of /ɪə/ to [jøː]
  - here /hɪə/ pronounced [hjøː] or [jøː] in broader accents
- A closer pronunciation of /ʌ/ as in love and other
- /ɑː/ is widely realised as [aː], giving a pronunciation of Cardiff /ˈkɑːdɪf/ as [ˈkaːdɪf]

In many bilingual areas Welsh words are often used in English conversations. As such, the term "Wenglish" has been in use since the 1980s to refer to this mixing of both languages.

=== Isle of Man ===
Manx English has its own distinctive accent, influenced to some extent by the Lancashire dialect and to a lesser extent by some variant of Irish English.

=== Ireland ===
Ireland has several main groups of accents, including (1) the accents of Ulster, with a strong influence from Scotland as well as the underlying Gaelic linguistic stratum, which in that province approaches the Gaelic of Scotland, (2) those of Dublin and surrounding areas on the east coast where English has been spoken since the earliest period of colonisation from Britain, and (3) the various accents of west, midlands, and south.

==== Ulster ====
The Ulster accent has two main sub accents, namely Mid Ulster English and Ulster Scots. The language is spoken throughout the nine counties of Ulster and in some northern areas of bordering counties such as Louth and Leitrim. It bears many similarities to Scottish English through influence from the Ulster varieties of Scots. Some characteristics of the Ulster accent include:

- As in Scotland, the vowels /ʊ/ and /u/ are merged, so that look and Luke are homophonous. The vowel is a high central rounded vowel, [ʉ].
- The diphthong /aʊ/ is pronounced approximately [əʉ], but wide variation exists, especially between social classes in Belfast.
- In Belfast, /eɪ/ is a monophthong in open syllables (e.g. day [dɛː]) but an ingliding diphthong in closed syllables (e.g. daze [deəz]). But the monophthong remains when inflectional endings are added, thus daze contrasts with days [dɛːz].
- The alveolar stops /t, d/ become dental before /r, ər/, e.g. tree and spider.
- /t/ often undergoes flapping to [ɾ] before an unstressed syllable, e.g. eighty [ˈeəɾi]

==== Connacht, Leinster, and Munster ====
The accent of these three provinces fluctuates greatly from the flat tone of the midlands counties of Laois, Kildare, and Offaly to the perceived sing-song of Cork and Kerry to the soft accents of Mayo and Galway.

Historically, the Dublin City and county area, parts of Wicklow and Louth, came under heavy exclusive influence from the first English settlements, known as The Pale. It remained until Independence from Britain as the biggest concentration of English influence on the whole island.

Some Cork accents have a unique lyrical intonation. Every sentence typically ends in the trademark elongated tail-off on the last word. In Cork, heavier emphasis yet is put on the "brrr" sound to the letter "R." This is usually the dialect in northern parts of Cork City.

Similar to the Cork accent but without the same intonation, Kerry puts even heavier emphasis on the "brrr" sound to the letter "R.", for example, the word "forty". Throughout the south, this word is pronounced whereby the "r" exhibits the typified Irish "brrr". In Kerry, especially in rural areas, the roll on the "r" is enforced with vibrations from the tongue, not unlike Scottish here.

"Are you?" becomes a cojoined "A-rrou?" single tongue flutter, especially in rural areas. This extra emphasis on "R" is also seen in varying measures through parts of West Limerick and West Cork in closer proximity to Kerry.

Another feature in the Kerry accent is the "S" before the consonant. True to its Gaelic origins in a manner similar to parts of Connacht, "s" maintains the "shh" sound as in "shop" or "sheep". The word "start" becomes "shtart", and "stop" becomes "shtop".

==== Irish Travellers ====
Irish Travellers have a very distinct accent closely related to a rural Hiberno-English, particularly the English of south-eastern Ireland. Many Irish Travellers who were born in parts of Dublin or Britain have the accent in spite of it being strikingly different from the local accents in those regions. They have their own language, Shelta, which strongly links in with their dialect/accent of English.

== North America ==
North American English is a collective term for the dialects of the United States and Canada. It does not include the varieties of Caribbean English spoken in the West Indies.

- Rhoticity: Most North American English accents differ from Received Pronunciation and some other British dialects by being rhotic. The rhotic consonant /r/ is pronounced before consonants and at the end of syllables, and the r-colored vowel [ɚ] is used as a syllable nucleus. For example, while the words "hard" and "singer" would be pronounced [hɑːd] and [ˈsɪŋə] in Received Pronunciation, they would be pronounced [hɑɹd] and [ˈsɪŋɚ] in General American. Exceptions are certain traditional accents found in eastern New England, New York City, and the Southern United States, plus African-American English.
- Mergers before /r/: R-coloring has led to some vowel mergers before historical /r/ that do not happen in most other native dialects. In many North American accents, "Mary", "merry", and "marry" sound the same (Mary–marry–merry merger), but they have the vowels /ɛə/, /æ/, /ɛ/, respectively, in RP. Similarly, "nearer" rhymes with "mirror" (mirror–nearer merger), though the two have different vowels in RP: /iː/ and /ɪ/. Other mergers before /r/ occur in various North American dialects.
- Mergers of the low back vowels: Other North American mergers that are absent in Received Pronunciation are the merger of the vowels of "caught" and "cot" ([kɔːt] and [kɒt] in RP) in many accents, and the merger of "father" (RP [ˈfɑːðə]) and "bother" (RP [ˈbɒðə]) in almost all.
- Flat a: Most North American accents lack the so-called trap–bath split found in Southern England: Words like "ask", "answer", "grass", "bath", "staff", and "dance" are pronounced with the short-a /æ/ of "trap", not with the broad "A" /ɑ/ of "father" heard in Southern England as well as in most of the Southern Hemisphere. In North America, the vowel of "father" has merged with that of "lot" and "bother" (see above). Related to the trap–bath split, North American dialects have a feature known as /æ/ tensing. This results in /æ/ in some environments, particularly nasals to be raised and even diphthongised, typically transcribed as [eə]. Thus, "answer" is typically pronounced as [eənsɚ] rather than [ænsɚ].
- Flapping of /t/ and /d/: In North American English, /t/ and /d/ both become the alveolar flap [ɾ] after a stressed syllable and between vowels or syllabic consonants, making the words "latter" and "ladder" homophones, either as [ˈlædɚ] or [ˈlæɾɚ].

According to linguists such as George Philip Krapp, John Samuel Kenyon and Brendan Houdek, the General American accent's identifying markers have no distinctive features that categorize a particular region, ethnic group, or socioeconomic status. Speaking with a General American accent allows the listener to recognise a distinctly American voice but unable to place exactly where they’re from. The regional accents of the United States that fit this category are Western, Western New England, and the North Midland (a band spanning central Ohio, central Indiana, central Illinois, northern Missouri, southern Iowa, and southeastern Nebraska), plus the accents of highly educated Americans nationwide.

=== Canada ===
Three major dialect areas can be found in Canada: Western/Central Canada, the Maritimes, and Newfoundland.

The phonology of West/Central Canadian English, also called General Canadian, is broadly similar to that of the Western US, except for the following features:

- The diphthongs /aɪ/ and /aʊ/ are raised to approximately [ʌɪ] and [ʌʊ] before voiceless consonants. For example, the vowel sound of "out" [ʌʊt] is different from that of "loud" [laʊd]. This feature is known as Canadian raising. The /ʌʊ/ is even more raised in Atlantic Canada, closer to /ɛʊ/.
- The short "a" of "bat" is more open than almost everywhere else in North America [æ̞ ~ a]. The other front lax vowels /ɛ/ and /ɪ/, too, can be lowered and/or retracted. This phenomenon has been labelled the Canadian Shift.

The pronunciation of certain words shows a British influence. For instance, "shone" is /ʃɒn/, "been" is often /biːn/, "lieutenant" is /lɛfˈtɛnənt/, "process" can be /ˈproʊsɛs/, etc.

Words like "drama", "pajamas"/"pyjamas", and "pasta" tend to have /æ/ rather than /ɑ/~/ɒ/. Words like "sorrow", "Florida", and "orange" have /ɔr/ rather than /ɑr/; therefore, "sorry" rhymes with "story" rather than with "starry".

=== West Indies and Bermuda ===
For discussion, see:

- Bahamian English
- Barbadian English
- Bequia English
- Bermudian English
- Caribbean English
- Jamaican English
- Saban English
- Trinidadian English

== Oceania ==
=== Australia ===
Australian English is relatively homogeneous when compared to British and American English. There is some regional variation between the states, particularly South Australia, Victoria, Queensland, Northern Territory, and Western Australia.

Three main varieties of Australian English are spoken according to linguists: Broad Australian, General Australian and Cultivated Australian English. They are part of a continuum, reflecting variations in accent. They tend to reflect the social class, education, and urban or rural background of the speaker.

- Australian Aboriginal English refers to the different varieties of the English language used by Indigenous Australians. These varieties, which developed differently in different parts of Australia, vary along a continuum, from forms close to General Australian to more nonstandard forms. There are distinctive features of accent, grammar, words, and meanings, as well as language use.
- The furthest extent of the Aboriginal dialect is Australian Kriol language, which is not mutually intelligible with General Australian English.
- On the Torres Strait Islands, a distinctive dialect known as Torres Strait English is spoken.
- In Australian English, pronunciations vary regionally according to the type of vowel that occurs before the sounds /nd/, /ns/, /nt/, /ntʃ/, and /mp/. In words like "chance", "plant", "branch", "sample", and "demand", the vast majority of Australians use the short /æ/ vowel from the word "cat". In South Australian English, there is a high proportion of people who use the broad /aː/ vowel from the word "cart" in these words.
- Centring diphthongs are the vowels that occur in words like "ear", "beard", "air", and "sheer". In Western Australian English, there is a tendency for centring diphthongs to be pronounced as full diphthongs. Those in the eastern states will tend to pronounce "fear" and "sheer" without any jaw movement, while the westerners would pronounce them like "fia" and "shia", respectively, which slightly resembles South African English but in a dialect different from New Zealand English.

=== New Zealand ===
New Zealand English is most similar to Australian English, particularly those of Victoria, Tasmania, New South Wales, and South Australia, but is distinguished from these accents by the presence of three "clipped" vowels, slightly resembling South African English. Phonetically, these are centralised or raised versions of the short "i", "e", and "a" vowels, which in New Zealand are close to [ɨ], [ɪ], and [ɛ], respectively, rather than [ɪ], [ɛ], and [æ]. New Zealand pronunciations are often popularly represented outside New Zealand by writing "fish and chips" as "fush and chups", "yes" as "yiss", and "sixty-six" as "suxty-sux".

Scottish English influence is most evident in the southern regions of New Zealand, notably in Dunedin. Another difference between New Zealand and Australian English is the length of the vowel in words such as "dog" and "job", which are longer than in Australian English, which shares the short and staccato pronunciation with British English. There is a tendency in New Zealand English, found in some but not all Australian English, to add a schwa between some grouped consonants in words, such that — for example — "shown" and "thrown" may be pronounced "showun" and "throwun".

Geographical variations appear slight and are mainly confined to individual special local words. One group of speakers holds a recognised place as "talking differently": The regions of Otago and especially Southland, both in the south of the South Island, harbour a "Celtic fringe" of people speaking with what is known as the "Southland burr" in which "R" is pronounced with a soft burr, particularly in words that rhyme with "nurse". The area formed a traditional repository of immigration from Scotland.

Some sections of the main urban areas of Auckland and Wellington show a stronger influence of Māori and Pacific island (e.g., Samoan) pronunciations and speech patterns than most of the country.

The trilled "r" is used by some Māori, who may pronounce "t" and "k" sounds without aspiration, striking other English speakers as similar to "d" and "g". This is also encountered in South African English, especially among Afrikaans speakers.

=== Norfolk Island and Pitcairn ===
The English spoken on the isolated Pacific islands of Norfolk and Pitcairn shows evidence of their long isolation from the world. Pitcairn's local creole, Pitkern, shows strong evidence of its rural English 19th-century origins, with an accent that has traces of both the English southwest and Geordie. The Norfolk Island equivalent, Norfuk, was greatly influenced in its development by Pitkern.

The accents heard on the islands when English is used are similarly influenced but in a much milder way. In the case of Norfolk Island, Australian English is the primary influence, producing something like a softened version of an Australian accent. The Pitcairn accent is for the most part largely indistinguishable from the New Zealand accent.

== Africa and the Atlantic ==
=== South Atlantic ===
==== Falkland Islands ====
The Falkland Islands have a large non-native-born population, mainly from Britain but also from Saint Helena. In rural areas, the Falkland accent tends to be stronger. The accent has resemblances to both Australia-NZ English and that of Norfolk in England and contains a number of Spanish loanwords.

==== Saint Helena ====
"Saints", as Saint Helenan islanders are called, have a variety of different influences on their accent. To outsiders, the accent has resemblances to the accents of South Africa, Australia, and New Zealand.

"Saint" is not just a different pronunciation of English; it also has its own distinct words. So "bite" means "spicy, as in full of chillies"; "us" is used instead of "we" ("us has been shopping"); and "done" is used to generate a past tense, hence "I done gorn fishing" ("I have been fishing").

Television is a reasonably recent arrival there and is only just beginning to have an effect. American terms are becoming more common, e.g. "chips" for crisps.

=== Southern Africa ===
==== South Africa ====
South Africa has 12 official languages, one of which is English. Accents vary significantly between ethnic and language groups. Home-language English speakers, Black, White, Indian, and Coloured, in South Africa have an accent that generally resembles British Received Pronunciation, modified with varying degrees of Germanic inflection due to Afrikaans.

The Coloured community is generally bilingual. English accents are strongly influenced by one's primary mother tongue, Afrikaans, or English. A range of accents can be seen, with the majority of Coloureds showing a strong Afrikaans inflection. Similarly, Afrikaners and Cape Coloureds, both descendants of mainly Dutch settlers, tend to pronounce English phonemes with a strong Afrikaans inflection. The English accents of both related groups are significantly different and easily distinguishable, primarily because of prevalent code-switching among the majority of Coloured English speakers, particularly in the Western Cape of South Africa. The range of accents found among English-speaking Coloureds, from the distinctive "Cape Flats or Coloured English" to the standard "colloquial" South African English accent, are of special interest. Geography and education levels play major roles therein.

Black Africans generally speak English as a second language. One's accent is strongly influenced by one's mother tongue, particularly Bantu languages. Urban middle-class Black Africans have developed an English accent, with similar inflection as first-language English speakers. Within this ethnic group, variations exist: Most Nguni (Xhosa, Zulu, Swazi, and Ndebele) speakers have a distinct accent, with the pronunciation of words like "the" and "that" as would "devil" and "dust", respectively, and words like "rice" as "lice".

This may be a result of the inadequacy of "r" in the languages. Sotho (Tswana, Northern Sotho, and Southern Sotho) speakers have a similar accent, with slight variations. Tsonga and Venda speakers have very similar accents with far less intonation than Ngunis and Sothos. Some Black speakers have no distinction between the "i" in "determine" and the one in "decline", pronouncing it similarly to the one in "mine".

Black, Indian, and Coloured students educated in former Model C schools or at formerly White tertiary institutions will generally adopt a similar accent to their White English-home-language speaking classmates. Code-switching and the "Cape Flats" accent are becoming popular among White learners in public schools within Cape Town.

South African accents vary between major cities, particularly Cape Town, Durban, and Johannesburg, and provinces (regions). Accent variation is observed within respective cities—for instance, Johannesburg, where the northern suburbs (Parkview, Parkwood, Parktown North, Saxonwold, etc.) tend to be less strongly influenced by Afrikaans. These suburbs are more affluent and populated by individuals with tertiary education and higher incomes.

The accents of native English speakers from the southern suburbs (Rosettenville, Turffontein, etc.) tend to be more strongly influenced by Afrikaans. These suburbs are populated by tradesmen and factory workers, with lower incomes. The extent of Afrikaans influence is explained by the fact that Afrikaans urbanisation would historically have been from failed marginal farms or failing economies in rural towns, into the southern and western suburbs of Johannesburg.

The western suburbs of Johannesburg (Newlands, Triomf, which has now reverted to its old name Sophiatown, Westdene, etc.) are predominantly Afrikaans-speaking. In a similar fashion, people from predominantly or traditionally Jewish areas in the Johannesburg area (such as Sandton, Linksfield, and Victory Park) may have accents influenced by Yiddish or Hebrew ancestry.

South African English accents, across the spectrum, are non-rhotic.

Examples of South African accents (obtained from http://accent.gmu.edu)

- Native English: Male (Cape Town)
- Native English: Female (Cape Town)
- Native English: Male (Port Elizabeth)
- Native English: Male (Nigel)
- Afrikaans (Primary): Female (Pretoria)
- Afrikaans (Primary): Male (Pretoria)
- Afrikaans (Primary): Male (Pretoria)
- Northern Sotho (Primary): Female (Polokwane)

Additional samples of South African accents and dialects can be found at http://web.ku.edu/~idea/africa/southafrica/southafrica.htm.

Regardless of regional and ethnic differences (in accents), South African English accents are sometimes confused with Australian (or New Zealand) English by British and American English speakers.

==== Zimbabwe ====
In Zimbabwe, formerly Rhodesia, native English speakers, mainly the White and Coloured minority, have a similar speech pattern to that of South Africa. Those with high degrees of Germanic inflection pronounce "Zimbabwe" as zim-bah-bwi, as opposed to the African pronunciation zeem-bah-bweh.

Zimbabwean accents vastly vary, with some Black Africans sounding British while others will have a much stronger accent influenced by their mother tongues. Usually, this distinction is brought about by where speakers grew up and the school attended. For example, most people who grew up in and around Harare have a British-sounding accent, while those in the rural areas have a more "pidgin-english" sort of accent.

Example of a Zimbabwean English accent (obtained from http://accent.gmu.edu)

- Shona (Primary): Female (Bulawayo)

==== Namibia ====
Namibian English tends to be strongly influenced by South African English. Most Namibians who grew up in and around the capital city, Windhoek, have developed an English accent. Those in rural areas have an accent strongly influenced by their mother tongue, particularly Bantu languages.

==== Nigeria ====
Nigerian English varies by constituent units. The accents are influenced by the various mother tongues of the Nigerian constituent units.

== Asia ==
=== India and South Asia ===
A number of distinct dialects of English are spoken in South Asia. There are many languages spoken in South Asia like Nepali, Hindi, Punjabi, Rajasthani, Sindhi, Balochi, Pashto, Assamese, Bengali, Bhojpuri, Gujarati, Kannada, Kashmiri, Marathi, Odia, Maithili, Malayalam, Sinhala, Tamil, Telugu, Tulu, Urdu and many more, creating a variety of accents of English. Accents originating in this part of the world tend to display several distinctive features, including:

- syllable-timing, in which a roughly equal time is allocated to each syllable, akin to the English of Singapore and Malaysia. Elsewhere, English speech timing is based predominantly on stress.
- "sing-song" pitch, somewhat reminiscent of those of Welsh English
- retroflexion of "t" and "d"

=== Philippines ===
Philippine English employs a rhotic accent that originated from the time it was first introduced by Americans during the colonization period in an attempt to replace Spanish as the dominant political language. As there are no /f/ or /v/ sounds in most native languages in the Philippines, [p] is used as an alternative to /f/ as [b] is to /v/. The words "fifty" and "five" are often pronounced as "pipty" and "pibe" by many Filipinos. Similarly, /θ/ is often changed to [t] and /ð/ to [d].

"Three" becomes /tri/ while "that" becomes /dat/. This feature is consistent with many other Malayo-Polynesian languages. /z/ is often devoiced to [s], whereas [ʒ] is often devoiced to [ʃ] or affricated to [dʒ], so words like "zoo", "measure", and "beige" may be pronounced [su], [ˈmɛʃoɾ], and [beɪdʒ].

Apart from the frequent inability to pronounce certain fricatives (e.g., [f], [v], [θ], [ð], [z], [ʒ]), in reality, there is no single Philippine English accent. This is because native languages influence spoken English in different ways throughout the archipelago. For instance, those from Visayas usually interchange the sounds /e/ and /i/ as well as /o/ and /u/ because the distinction between those phonemes is not very pronounced in Visayan languages.

People from the northern Philippines may pronounce /r/ as a strong trill instead of a tap, which is more commonly used in the rest of the Philippines, as the trill is a feature of the Ilocano language. Ilocano people generally pronounce the schwa sound /ə/ better than other Filipinos because they use a similar sound in their native language that is missing from many other Philippine languages.

=== Hong Kong ===
The accent of English spoken in Hong Kong follows mainly British, with rather strong influence from Cantonese on the pronunciations of a few consonants and vowels, sentence grammar, and structure.

=== Malaysia ===
Malay is the lingua franca of Malaysia, a federation of former British colonies and similar dependencies. English is a foreign language with no official status, but it is commonly learnt as a second or third language.

The Malaysian accent appears to be a melding of British, Chinese, Tamil, and Malay influences.

Many Malaysians adopt different accents and usages depending on the situation. For example, an office worker may speak with less colloquialism and with a more British accent on the job than with friends or while out shopping.

- Syllable-timing, where speech is timed according to syllable, akin to the English of the Indian Subcontinent. Elsewhere, speech is usually timed to stress.
- A quick, staccato style, with "puncturing" syllables and well-defined, drawn-out tones
- Non-rhoticity, like most varieties of English language in England. Hence, "caught" and "court" are homophonous as /kɔːt/ (in actuality, [kɔːʔ] or [koːʔ]), "can't" rhymes with "aren't", etc.
- The "ay" and "ow" sounds in "raid" and "road" (/eɪ/ and /oʊ/, respectively) are pronounced as monophthongs, i.e. with no "glide": [red] and [rod].
- /θ/ is pronounced as [t] and /ð/ as [d]; hence, "thin" is [tɪn] and "then" is [dɛn].
- Depending on how colloquial the situation is: many discourse particles, or words inserted at the end of sentences that indicate the role of the sentence in discourse and the mood it conveys, like "lah", "leh", "mah", "hor", etc.

=== Singapore ===
Singapore is effectively a multilingual nation. The Singapore government recognises four official languages: English, Malay, Mandarin Chinese, and Tamil.

Students in primary and secondary schools learning English as the language of instruction also learn a second language called their "Mother Tongue" by the Ministry of Education, where they are taught Mandarin Chinese, Malay, or Tamil. A main point to note is while "Mother Tongue" generally refers to the first language (L1) overseas, in Singapore, it is used by the Ministry of Education to denote the traditional language of one's ethnic group, which sometimes can be their second language (L2).

There are two main types of English spoken in Singapore: Standard Singapore English and Singlish. Singlish is more widely spoken than Standard English. It has a very distinctive tone and sentence structure, which are both strongly influenced by Malay and the many varieties of Chinese spoken in the city.

A 2005 census showed that around 30% of Singaporeans speak English as their main language at home.

There are many foreigners working in Singapore. 36% of the population in Singapore are foreigners, and foreigners make up 50% of the service sector. Therefore, it is very common to encounter service staff who are not fluent in English. Most of these staff speak Mandarin Chinese. Those who do not speak Mandarin Chinese tend to speak either broken English or Singlish, which they have learnt from the locals.

== Antarctica ==
Phonetic change in the English spoken at a base in Antarctica has been registered. This has been referred to as the start of a new accent called Antarctic English.

== See also ==
- American English
- British English
- American and British English spelling differences
- English phonology
- Survey of English Dialects
- List of dialects of English
- International Dialects of English Archive
- Sound correspondences between English accents
- Koiné language

== Bibliography ==
- Kretzschmar, William A. Jr. (2004). "Standard American English pronunciation". In Schneider, Edgar W.; Burridge, Kate; Kortmann, Bernd; Mesthrie, Rajend; Upton, Clive (eds.). A Handbook of Varieties of English. Vol. 1: Phonology. Berlin: Mouton de Gruyter. pp. 257–269. ISBN 3-11-017532-0.
- Labov, William; Ash, Sharon; Boberg, Charles (2006), The Atlas of North American English, Berlin: Mouton-de Gruyter, pp. 187–208, ISBN 3-11-016746-8
- Van Riper, William (2014). "General American: An Ambiguity". In Harold Allen; Michael Linn (eds.). Dialect and Language Variation. Elsevier. ISBN 978-1-4832-9476-6.
- Wells, J C (1982). Accents of English 3: Beyond the British Isles. Cambridge University Press. ISBN 0-521-28541-0.
