= Variation in Australian English =

Australian English is relatively homogeneous when compared with British and American English. The major varieties of Australian English are sociocultural rather than regional. They are divided into three main categories: general, broad and cultivated.

There are a number of Australian English-based creole languages. Differing significantly from English, these are not considered dialects of English; rather, they are considered separate languages. Notable examples are Torres Strait Creole, spoken on the Torres Strait Islands, Northern Cape York and South-Western Coastal Papua; the Norfuk language, spoken by some inhabitants of Norfolk Island, and Australian Kriol, which developed in and around the Sydney region in the days of early European settlement, and now exists only in rural areas of the Northern Territory.

== Sociocultural variation ==
=== Broad, general and cultivated Australian ===
Variation in Australian closing diphthongs
Phoneme	Lexical set	Phonetic realization		
Phoneme	Lexical set	Cultivated	General	Broad
/iː/	FLEECE	[ɪi]	[ɪ̈i]	[əːɪ]
/ʉː/	GOOSE	[ʊu]	[ɪ̈ɯ, ʊʉ]	[əːʉ]
/æɪ/	FACE	[ɛɪ]	[æ̠ɪ]	[æ̠ːɪ, a̠ːɪ]
/əʉ/	GOAT	[ö̞ʊ]	[æ̠ʉ]	[æ̠ːʉ, a̠ːʉ]
/ɑɪ/	PRICE	[a̠e]	[ɒe]	[ɒːe]
/æɔ/	MOUTH	[a̠ʊ]	[æo]	[ɛːo, ɛ̃ːɤ]

Three main varieties of Australian English are spoken according to linguists: broad, general and cultivated. They are part of a continuum, reflecting variations in accent. They can, but do not always, reflect the social class, education and urban or rural background of the speaker.

- Broad Australian English is recognisable and familiar to English speakers around the world. It is prevalent nationwide but is especially common in rural areas. In Australia, this dialect is sometimes called Strine /ˈstɹɑɪn/ (or "Strayan" /ˈstɹæɪən/, a shortening of the word Australian), and a speaker of the dialect may be referred to as an Ocker. Tests indicated that the Broad speakers demonstrated a greater tendency for syllable assimilation and consonant elision, were more likely to use weak consonants or restricted intonation (narrow pitch range), were more likely to speak slowly (drawl), and further, showed a greater tendency to exhibit pervasive nasality. Diphthongs are usually pronounced longer as well. Along the East Coast, there is an approximate correlation between latitude and accent, being the further north one is, the more nasal/broad the accent. Nasality is already evident at the New South Wales/Queensland border. Examples of people with this accent include Steve Irwin, Paul Hogan and former prime ministers Julia Gillard, Bob Hawke and John Howard.
- General Australian English is the most common of Australian accents. It is especially prominent in urban Australia and is used as a standard language for Australian films, television programs and advertising. Some linguists have argued that modern General Australian closely resembles the foundational Australian accent that emerged during the early colonial period in the 19th century. It is used by Hugh Jackman, Rose Byrne, Rebel Wilson, Chris Hemsworth and Eric Bana.
- Cultivated Australian English has in the past been perceived as a prestige accent indicating high social class or education. Additionally, a study in 1989 reported that Cultivated Australian English speakers were being rated higher than Broad Australian English speakers in intelligence, competence, reliability, honesty, and social status. In comparison, Broad Australian English speakers are rated higher in terms of humorousness and talkativity, similar to what was found in a study in 1975 comparing regional British accents to Received Pronunciation (RP). Cultivated Australian English also has some similarities to Received Pronunciation and the learned "Transatlantic" accents and Northeastern elite accents of the United States as well. In recent generations, it has fallen sharply in usage. However, the cultivated usages of [ɛɪ] in "face" and [aɪ] in "price" have been integrated into the speech of some of the speakers of General Australian. [ɪi] for FLEECE is also within the General Australian range, as the ongliding of /iː/ is variable. Speakers with a Cultivated Australian accent include Cate Blanchett, Lisa Gerrard, Geoffrey Rush and former prime minister Malcolm Fraser, the last Australian Prime Minister to use Cultivated Australian English in public life.

=== Aboriginal and Torres Strait Islander English ===
Australian Aboriginal English refers to a dialect of Australian English used by a large proportion of Indigenous Australians. It is made up of a range of forms which developed differently in different parts of Australia, and are said to vary along a continuum, from forms close to Standard Australian English to more non-standard forms. There are distinctive features of accent, grammar, words and meanings, as well as language use. The dialect is not to be confused with Australian Kriol language, which is not mutually intelligible with Australian English but in fact a separate language spoken by over 30,000 people. On the Torres Strait Islands, a distinctive dialect known as Torres Strait English, the furthest extent of which is Torres Strait Creole, is spoken.

=== Ethnocultural varieties ===
The ethnocultural dialects are diverse accents in Australian English that are spoken by minority groups, which are of non-English speaking background. Substantial immigration from Asia has led to a large increase in diversity and people expressing their cultural identity within the Australian context. These ethnocultural varieties contain features of General Australian English as adopted by the children of immigrants blended with some non-English language features, such as the Afro-Asiatic and Asian languages.

From the 1960s and 1970s, major cities such as Sydney and Melbourne received large numbers of immigrants from Southern Europe and the Middle East (Italians, Greeks, Lebanese, Maltese, Croats, Macedonians, Turks etc.); the second generation of these immigrants can also have a distinct accent, in a similar fashion to the east coast of the United States with descendants of European migrants having the "Jersey accent".

Chinese-Australian English has the all-purpose exclamation "aiyah!"/"aiyoh!" (what a shame! – from Mandarin/Cantonese) and sometimes will end sentences with "lah" (from Singlish).

==== Lebanese Australian English ====
Lebanese Australian English (LAusE) has been prescribed as a new dialect of Australian English. It is generally spoken by Australian speakers of Lebanese descent. Closely resembling the general Australian accent, the variety was based on the acoustic phonetic characteristics in the speech of young, Lebanese Australian male university students in Sydney, who speak English as their first language and also use vernacular Arabic. Compared to standard Australian English, the students had minor vowel motion differences with striking voicing and related timing effects.

Other Middle Eastern Australians too, particularly in the Sydney area (in the 2006 census, 72.8% of Lebanese-Australians lived in Sydney) have a similar dialect. Among Arab Australians, words such as "shoo" (what's up) and "yallah" (let's go/goodbye). "Habib" has a use similar to mate (meaning friend), but can also be a pejorative word for males who assert themselves aggressively – a type of person obsessed with grabbing girls' attention, "hotted-up" (meaning modified or hot-rodded) cars and loud music. wallah is also used, meaning "I swear to God" or "Really!"

== Regional variation ==
Although relatively homogeneous, some regional variations in Australian English are notable. The dialects of English spoken in the eastern states, where the majority of the population lives, differ somewhat to those spoken in South Australia, Tasmania and Western Australia. Another notable dialect is Torres Strait English, spoken by the inhabitants of the Torres Strait Islands. Torres Strait English, as distinct from Torres Strait Creole, developed separately to, but has been significantly influenced by, General Australian English.

The regional varieties of English can be distinguished in terms of vocabulary and phonology. With each local dialect taking words from various sources such as British, Irish and American English as well as local Aboriginal languages, it is in vocabulary where regional varieties are most distinct from each other. Regional phonological features may be inherited due to differing settlement patterns or may have developed locally.

=== Vocabulary ===
There are differences in the names of beer glasses from one area to another. In the 2000s, however, the range of glass sizes in actual use has been greatly reduced. In New South Wales, swimwear is known as swimmers or cossie and, in Queensland, it is togs. In border areas such as the Tweed Heads-Gold Coast area this can vary. In most other areas, the term bathers dominates. What is referred to by schoolchildren as a bag in most parts of Australia is known as a "port" by some Queenslanders. Further, the processed meat known as "devon" on the East Coast is known as "polony" on the West Coast, while in Central Australia (South Australia and the Northern Territory), the term "fritz" is used.

Tasmanian English features numerous deviations from mainland vocabulary, including "cordial" to refer to carbonated soft drink. Tasmanian vocabulary also retains words from historic English dialects that have otherwise gone extinct – such as Jerry (fog), nointer (a mischievous child), and yaffler (a loud mouthed, obnoxious person), derived from an archaic word for the Green woodpecker. The Norfolk dialect word "rummum" (strange, odd person) has become "rum'un" (a scallywag, eccentric character).

Many regional variations are due to Australians' passion for sport and the differences in non-linguistic traditions from one state to another: the word football refers to the most popular code of football in different States or regions, or even ethnic groups within them. Victorians start a game of Australian rules football with a ball up, Western Australians with a bounce down; New South Wales people and Queenslanders start a game of rugby league football or rugby union football with a kick off, as do soccer players across Australia.

From 2004, the national governing body for association football, (the Football Federation Australia), has promoted the use of "football" in place of "soccer". Several media outlets have adopted this use, while others have stuck with "soccer". However, use of the word "football" to mean either Australian football or rugby league, depending on the major code of the state, remains the standard usage in Australia. In all places, the specific name or nickname of the code ("soccer", "league", "union" or "Aussie rules") can often be heard used for disambiguation.

The slang word footy has been traditionally associated with either Australian rules football (Victoria, South Australia, Western Australia, Tasmania, Northern Territory) or rugby league football (New South Wales, Queensland). Prominent examples in popular culture are The Footy Shows; also FootyTAB, a betting wing of the NSW TAB.

For many Australians, the verb barrack (or the accompanying noun form barracker), is used to denote following a team or club. Barrack has its origins in British English, although in the UK it now usually means to jeer or denigrate an opposing team or players. The expression "root (or rooting) for a team", as used in the United States, is not generally used in Australia (root is slang for sexual intercourse in Australia).

There are many regional variations for describing social classes or subcultures. A bogan is also referred to as a bevan in Queensland. These variations, however, have almost completely been replaced by the term bogan. Tasmania sometime uses the terms Chigger and Ravo, derived from the low-socioeconomic suburbs of Chigwell and Ravenswood, though bogan is also understood.

Australian English has adopted and adapted words from Aboriginal and Torres Strait Islander languages, often for place names (eg: Canberra, Wollongong, Geelong) or the names of animals (eg: kangaroo, kookaburra, barramundi) and plants (eg: waratah, kurrajong). A notable borrowing is "hard yakka" meaning hard work (from Yagara "yaga" meaning work).

=== Phonology ===
Variation between /ɐː/ and /æ/

There exists significant regional variation in terms of the extent to which the trap–bath split has taken hold particularly before /nd/ (especially the suffix -mand), /ns/, /nt/, /ntʃ/ and /mpəl/. In words like chance, plant, branch, sample and demand, the majority of Australians use /æː/ (as in hand). Some, however, use /ɐː/ (as in cart) in these words, particularly in South Australia, which had a different settlement chronology and type from other parts of the country. In parts of Victoria and South Australia, castle rhymes with hassle rather than parcel. Also, some may use /æː/ in grasp, gasp, plaque and rasp. The table below shows the percentage of speakers from different capital cities who pronounce words with /ɐː/ as opposed to /æ/.

Use of /ɐː/ as opposed to /æ/
Word	Hobart	Melbourne	Brisbane	Sydney	Adelaide	Ave. over all five cities
graph	0%	30%	56%	70%	86%	48%
chance	0%	60%	25%	80%	86%	50%
demand	10%	78%	78%	90%	100%	71%
dance	10%	35%	11%	30%	86%	34%
castle	60%	30%	33%	100%	86%	62%
grasp	90%	89%	89%	95%	100%	93%
to contrast	100%	100%	100%	100%	71%	94%
Ave. over all seven words	39%	60%	56%	81%	88%	65%

Centring diphthongs

In Western Australian English, the centring diphthong vowels in near and square are typically realised as full diphthongs, [iə] or [ia] and [eə] or [ea] respectively, whereas in the eastern states they may also be realised as monophthongs (without jaw movement), [iː] and [eː] respectively.

L–vocalisation

When /l/ occurs at the ends of words before pauses and before consonants it sometimes sounds like a vowel sound rather than a consonant. This is because /l/ is made with two different articulations. One of the articulations is like a vowel articulation and the other is more like a typical consonant articulation. When /l/ occurs at the ends of words before pauses and before other consonants, the consonantal articulation can be obscured by the vowel articulation. This makes the /l/ sound like /ʊ/.

The tendency for some /l/ sounds to become vowels is more common in South Australian English than that of other states. Milk, for example, in South Australia has a vocalised /l/, leading to the pronunciation [mɪʊ̯k], whereas in other states the /l/ is pronounced as a consonant.

Salary–celery merger

In Victoria, many speakers pronounce /æ/ and /e/ in a way that is distinct from speakers in other states. Many younger speakers from Victoria pronounce the first vowel in "celery" and "salary" the same, so that both words sound like "salary". These speakers will also tend to say "halicopter" instead of "helicopter", and pronounce their capital city (Melbourne) as [ˈmæɫbən]. For some older Victorian speakers, the words "celery" and "salary" also sound the same but instead both sound like "celery". These speakers will also pronounce words such as "alps" as "elps".

Variation in /ʉːl/

The vowel in words like "pool", "school" and "fool" varies regionally.

== See also ==
- Australian English
- Australian English vocabulary
- Australian English phonology
- Regional accents of English speakers

== Bibliography ==
- Bernard, J. R. (1989). "Regional variation in Australian English: a survey". In Peter Collins and David Blair (ed.). Australian English. University of Queensland Press. pp. 255–259.
- Bradley, David (1989). "Regional dialects in Australian English phonology". In Peter Collins and David Blair (ed.). Australian English. University of Queensland Press. pp. 260–270.
- Bryant, Pauline (1985). "Regional variation in the Australian English lexicon". Australian Journal of Linguistics. 5 (1): 55–66. doi:10.1080/07268608508599336.
- Bryant, Pauline (1991). "A survey of regional usage in the lexicon of Australian English". In Suzanne Romaine (ed.). Language in Australia. Cambridge University Press. pp. 287–303.
- Bryant, Pauline (1992). Regional variation in the lexicon of Australian English (PhD thesis). Australian National University.
- Crystal, David (1995). The Cambridge encyclopedia of the English language (1st ed.). Cambridge: Cambridge University Press. ISBN 9780521401791.
- Horvath, Barbara (1985). Variation in Australian English: The Sociolects of Sydney. Cambridge University Press.
- Ramson, W. S. (1989). "Regionalism in Australian English: the value of newspaper evidence". Australian Journal of Linguistics. 9 (1): 73–84. doi:10.1080/07268608908599412.
