= South Australian English =

Variety of the English language

South Australian English is the variety of English spoken in the Australian state of South Australia. As with the other regional varieties within Australian English, these have distinctive vocabularies. To a lesser degree, there are also some differences in phonology (pronunciation). There is also significant influence from minority groups within the state, such as the ethnic German community, a sizeable amount of which speak Barossa German.

There are four localised, regional varieties of English in South Australia: Adelaide English, Eyre and Yorke Peninsula English, South East South Australia English and Northern South Australia English. While there are many commonalities, each has its own variations in vocabulary.

== Vocabulary ==
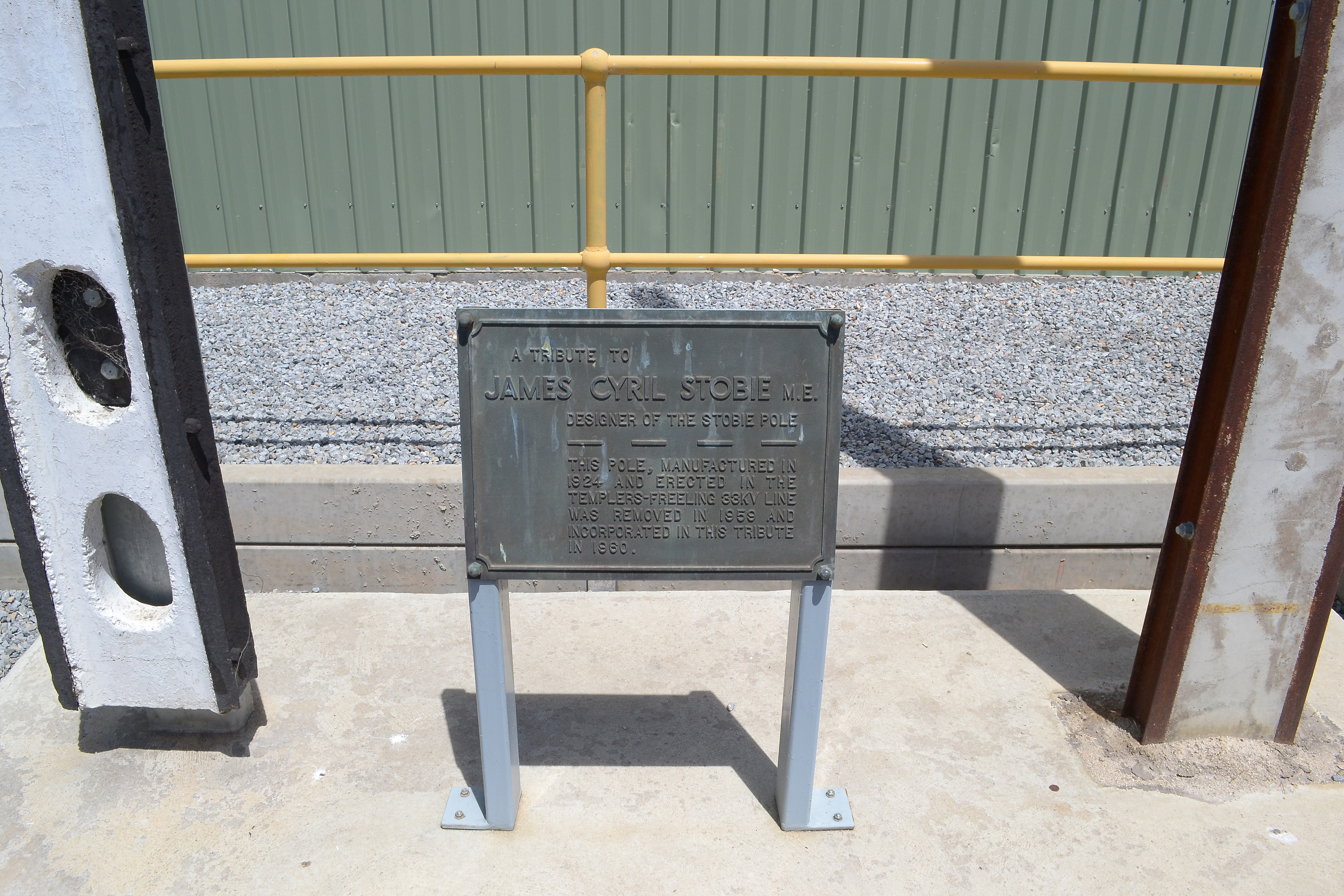
Plaque in honour of James Stobie, inventor of the "Stobie pole."

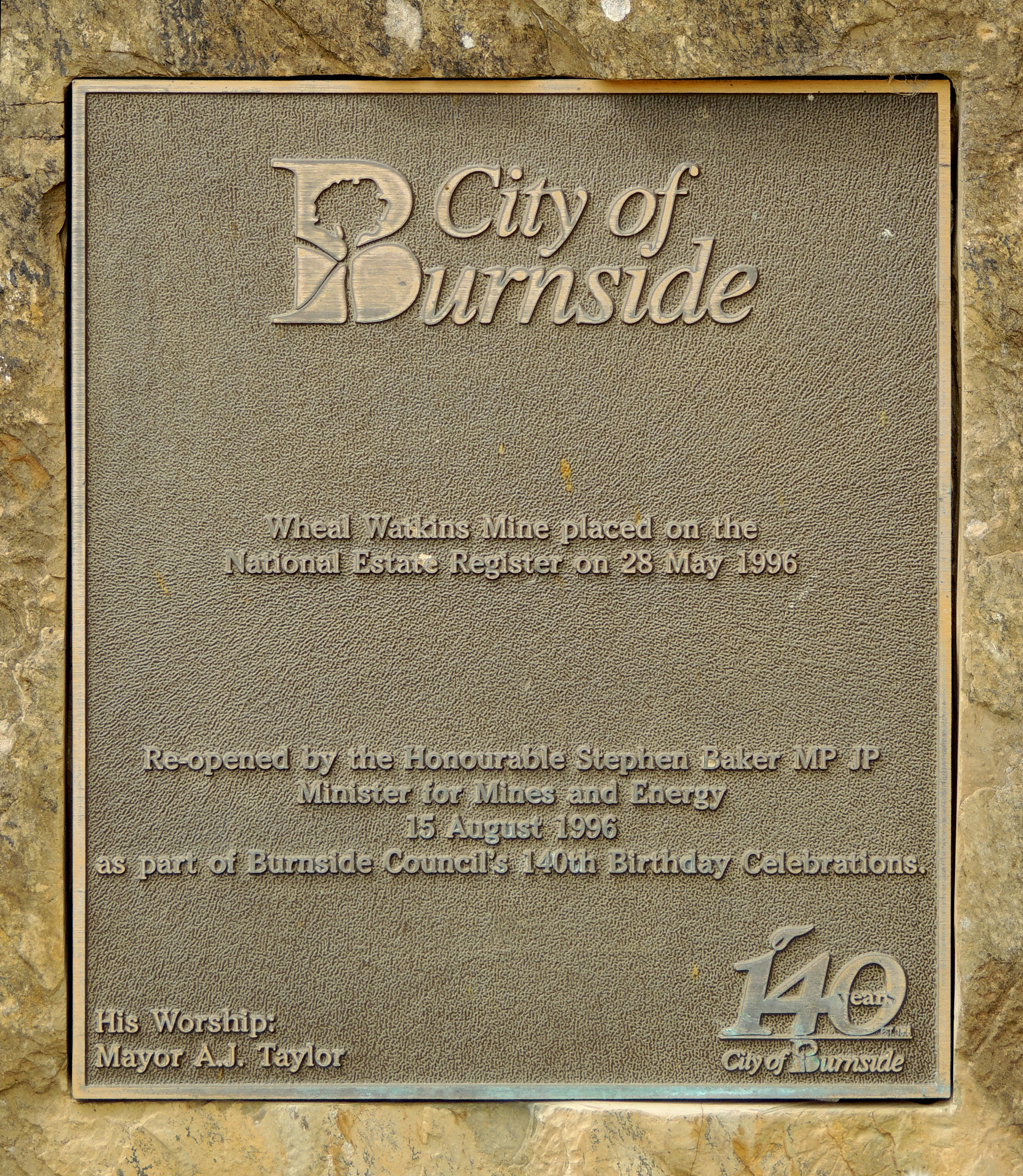
Plaque at Wheal Watkins Mine, Glen Osmond, South Australia; "Wheal", from the Cornish hwel, is used in SA to refer to mines.

While some of the words attributed to South Australians are used elsewhere in Australia, many genuine regional words are used throughout the state. Some of these are German in origin, reflecting the origins of many early settlers. Such was the concentration of German speakers in and around the Barossa Valley, it has been suggested they spoke their own dialect of German, known as "Barossa German". The influence of South Australia's German heritage is evidenced by the adoption into the dialect of certain German or German-influenced vocabulary.

One such local word with German origins is "butcher", the name given to a 200 mL (7.0 imp fl oz; 6.8 US fl oz) beer glass, which is believed to be derived from the German Becher, meaning a cup or mug. "Butcher" is more commonly attributed to publicans around Adelaide who kept these smaller glasses for abattoir workers coming in straight from work for a drink before heading home.

Processed luncheon meat is known as "fritz" in South Australia, whereas in other states it is referred to as devon, stras or polony.

Another uniquely South Australian word is "Stobie pole", which is the pole used to support power and telephone lines. It was invented in South Australia by James Stobie in 1924.

Cornish miners represented another significant wave of early immigrants, and they contributed Cornish language words, such as wheal (from Cornish hwel, "mine"), which is preserved in many place names.

South Australian dialects also preserve other British English usages which do not occur elsewhere in Australia: for example, farmers use reap and reaping, as well as "harvest" and "harvesting".

== Phonology ==
=== TRAP–BATH split ===
In Australian English, pronunciations vary regionally according to the type of vowel that occurs before the sounds nd, ns, nt, nce, nch, and mple, and the pronunciation of the suffix "-mand". In words like "chance", "plant", "branch", "sample" and "demand", the vast majority of Australians use the flat /æ/ TRAP vowel.

In South Australia, however, there is a high proportion of people who use the broad /aː/ PALM vowel in BATH words. For example, a 1995 survey of pronunciation in different cities found that 86% of those surveyed in Adelaide pronounced graph with an /aː/, whereas 100% of those surveyed in Hobart and 70% of those surveyed in Melbourne used /æ/.

Because of the prevalence of the South Australian broad A, the South Australian accent appears to be closer to Cultivated Australian English or Received Pronunciation than other state dialects.

=== L-vocalisation ===
The tendency for some /l/ sounds to become vowels (/l/ vocalisation) is more common in South Australia than other states. "Hurled", for example, in South Australia has a semi vocalised /l/, leading to the pronunciation [həːʊ̯d], whereas in other states the /l/ is pronounced as a consonant. The "l" is semi vocalised; for example, "milk" is pronounced as [mɪʊ̯k] and "hill" is pronounced as [hɪʊ̯].

== See also ==
- Australian English
- Australian English phonology
- Australian English vocabulary
- Variation in Australian English
- Other regional varieties:
  - Western Australian English
