= Barossa German =

German dialect of South Australia

- Barossadeutsch, Barossa-Deutsch
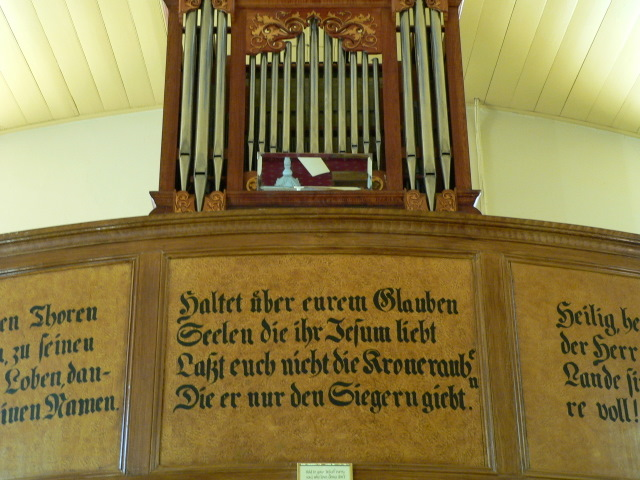
- German text in the Gruenberg Lutheran Church at Moculta.
- Region: Barossa Valley, South Australia
- Ethnicity: German Australians
- Language family: Indo-European: Germanic; West Germanic; Weser–Rhine Germanic; Central German; East Central German; Barossa German
- Writing system: German alphabet

Language codes
- ISO 639-3: –
- IETF: de-u-sd-ausa

Barossa German (German: Barossadeutsch or Barossa-Deutsch) is a dialect of German, predominantly spoken in the Barossa Valley region of South Australia. The prominent South Australian writer, Colin Thiele (1920–2006), whose grandparents were German immigrants, referred to "Barossa-Deutsch" as: "that quaintly inbred and hybrid language evolved from a century of linguistic isolation". It takes its name from the Barossa Valley, where many German people settled during the 19th century. Some words from Barossa German have entered South Australian English.

== History ==
The first wave of German settlement in Australia began in 1838. German was first spoken in the Barossa Valley in the 1840s, when German Lutheran settlers from Prussia arrived in the area.

Use of the German language in Australia declined as a result of World War I. Many Germans were interned, and immigration by German people was officially banned between 1914 and 1925. In addition, the German language was actively suppressed by the Australian government during the war. For example, many placenames with German origins were changed. Lutheran schools were closed (mainly in South Australia) and were re-opened as state schools teaching in English.

There is some evidence that Barossa German was the first language of some people in South Australia until the late 20th century. For example, Colin Thiele claimed to have spoken nothing but German until he went to school.

== Classification ==
Because most German immigrants to the Barossa were from Prussia and Silesia, Barossa German is classifiable as a Central German dialect. It is therefore relatively close to Standard German, when compared to analogous dialects spoken by German diaspora communities around the world.

According to linguist Peter Mickan, Barossa German has incorporated some elements of South Australian English, including some English vocabulary and grammatical forms.

== Vocabulary and culture ==
The best-known examples of Barossa German vocabulary are words which have been adopted by South Australian English. One such local word with German origins is "butcher", the name given to a 200 ml (7 fl.oz.) beer glass, which is believed to be derived from the German Becher, meaning a cup or mug.

The Barossa is also home to kegel, a variety of nine-pin bowling, which takes place on indoor lanes (Kegelbahn), and is based on traditional German games similar to alley skittles. The Barossa town of Tanunda still features the Tanunda Kegel Club, founded in 1858.

=== English influence ===
While Barossa German has itself influenced South Australian English, English has had an even greater influence over Barossa German, with speakers often using words in their speech and even adapting them to German grammar. Common nouns are also uncapitalised, like in English but unlike in Standard German.

An example of a Barossa German sentence compared with a Standard German sentence is shown below.

The rabbit jumped over the fence and nibbled the carrots.
Der	rabbit	ist	über	den	fence	gejumpt	und	hat	die	carrots	abgenibbelt.
Das	Kaninchen	ist	über	den	Zaun	gehüpft	und	hat	die	Karotten	abgenagt.
The	rabbit	is	over	the	fence	jumped	and	has	the	carrots	nibbled.

== See also ==
- German settlement in Australia
- German Australian

== Sources ==
- Peter Paul, 1965, Das Barossa Deutsche (MA thesis, University of Adelaide)
- Dorothy Jauncey, 2004, South Australian Words: From Bardi-Grubs to Frog Cakes, Oxford University Press. (ISBN 978-01-9551-770-5)
