= Strine =

Australian accent

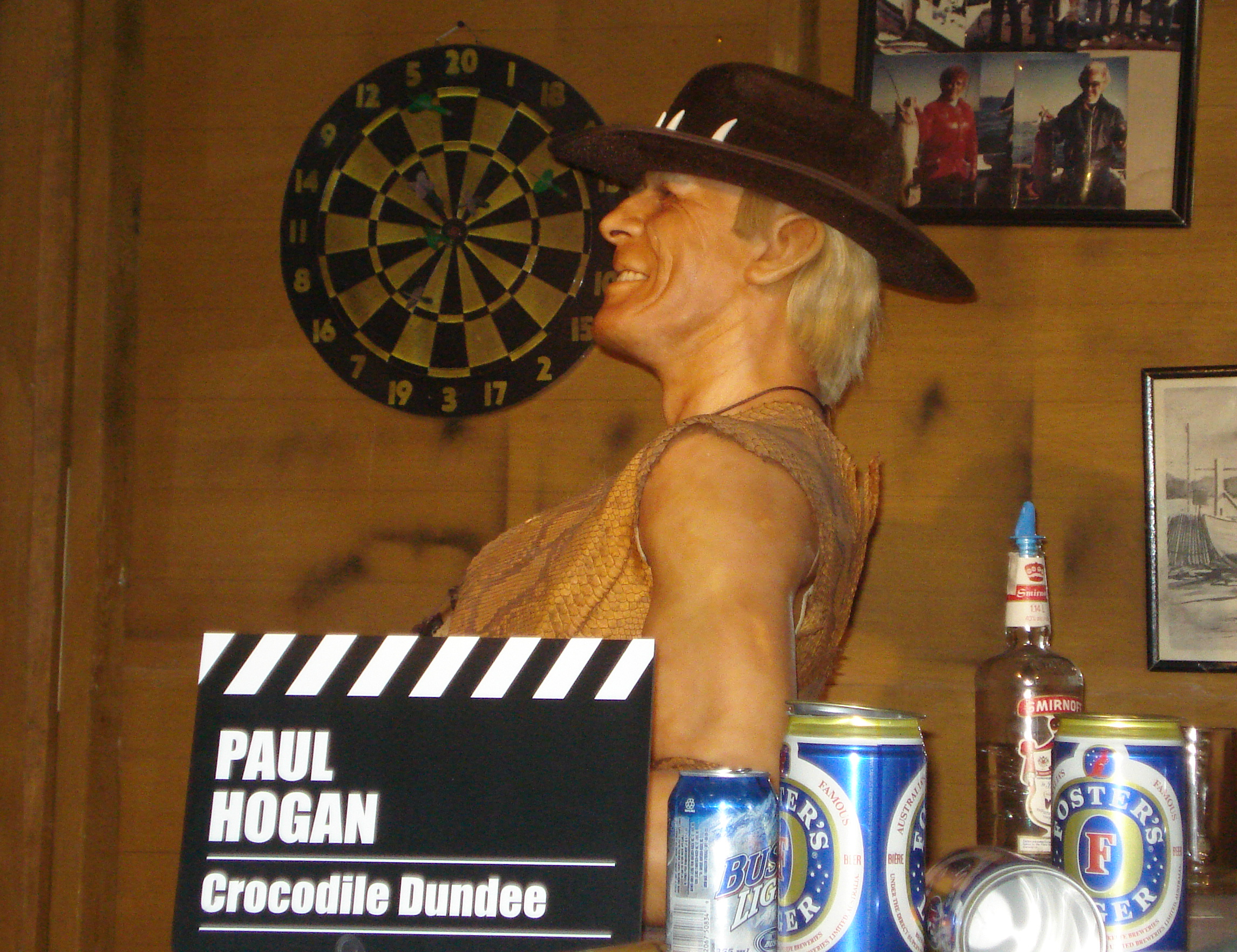
Paul Hogan was widely associated with Broad Australian speech and the "Strine" style traditionally linked to outback and rural Australian identity

Strine, also spelled Stryne (/ˈstraɪn/), is a colloquial term referring to the Broad Australian English accent and stereotypical forms of Australian English. The term is commonly associated with strongly nasal vowel pronunciations, extensive use of slang, vowel shifts, elision of syllables, and speech patterns traditionally linked to working-class, rural, and "ocker" Australian identity. Broad Australian English occupies one end of the Australian accent continuum, contrasting with Cultivated Australian speech at the opposite end and General Australian in the middle. Someone who speaks Strine is called an Ocker. The term was coined in 1964 when the accent was the subject of humorous columns published in the Sydney Morning Herald from the mid-1960s.

The term is a syncope, derived from a shortened phonetic rendition of the pronunciation of the word "Australian" in an exaggerated Broad Australian accent, drawing upon the tendency of this accent to run syllables together in a form of liaison. Recent generations have seen a comparatively smaller proportion of the population speaking with the Broad sociocultural variant, which differs from General Australian in its phonology. The Broad variant is found across the continent and is relatively more prominent in rural and outer-suburban areas. The late environmentalist and TV presenter Steve Irwin was once referred to as the person who "talked Strine like no other contemporary personality".

== History ==
=== Origins and development ===
Broad Australian, or 'Strine', likely emerged from New South Wales, in southeastern Australia, in the early 1800s, when the population was significantly increasing by the importation of convicts. Many of the convicts came from Britain and Ireland, the origin of Broad Australian. However, the area was relatively isolated from outside influences which fostered the growth of a new dialect. In the late 1800s, people from New South Wales began to move to other parts of the continent because of increased overseas immigration, gold rushes, and other factors. Some linguists have argued that the introductory Australian accent more closely resembled Broad Australian speech, though others contend that it was probably nearer to the form of General Australian spoken by most Australians today. Linguist Felicity Cox stated that, although the early colonial accent would have differed from contemporary Australian speech due to ongoing linguistic change, it nevertheless formed the basis of the modern Australian accent.

During the early 20th century, a form of Australian English emerged that diverged further from Received Pronunciation and came to be known as Strine. This variety was characterised by vowel and diphthong pronunciations more distinct from contemporary British standards, as well as by greater nasality, flatter intonation, and increased elision of syllables. Misunderstandings by non-Australians of words such as "mate" and "race" as "mite" and "rice" are most strongly associated with Broad Australian speech. Some linguists have suggested that Broad Australian speech became associated with the vernacular culture and popular identity of ordinary Australians, while Cultivated Australian reflected continuing British influence and imperial identity.

Linguists have also noted little evidence for the existence of a distinct Broad Australian accent during the 19th century. Research by Felicity Cox and Sallyanne Palethorpe examining recordings of rural Australians born in the 1880s found that many speakers used accents closer to General Australian than the strongly Broad Australian speech later stereotypically associated with rural areas. The findings have led some researchers to suggest that Broad Australian, like Cultivated Australian, may have emerged later as a socially differentiated variety. Scholars have additionally argued that increasing commentary on Australian vowel pronunciations during the late 19th and early 20th centuries may reflect changing social perceptions of speech rather than entirely new pronunciation patterns. Felicity Cox has suggested that Broad Australian may have developed more prominently during or after World War I, possibly influenced by the speech culture associated with Australian soldiers, or "diggers". World War I played an important role in the development of Australian national identity and colloquial Australian English, contributing to the spread of new Australian vocabulary and increased awareness among Australian soldiers of the differences between their speech and that of British troops.

=== Cultural representation and popular culture ===
In 1946, linguist A. G. Mitchell proposed a distinction between "educated Australian" and "broad Australian" speech varieties. Australian playwrights initially found success in alternative venues such as La Mama Theatre, Nimrod Theatre, and the Pram Factory, where productions often explored subversive themes and working-class characters. Many of these works featured "larrikin" or "ocker" figures, bringing Broad Australian accents and vernacular speech onto the stage. However, as playwrights such as David Williamson later gained prominence within major subsidised theatre companies including the Melbourne Theatre Company and Sydney Theatre Company, these character types were increasingly replaced by more cultivated and middle-class representations that reflected the preferences of more affluent audiences. The so-called New Wave theatre movement initially emerged in alternative venues, where Broad Australian accents became associated with cultural resistance to British theatrical conventions. As many of these playwrights later gained institutional support and mainstream audiences, however, Cultivated Australian increasingly became the dominant stage accent, while Broad Australian was more often reserved for comic, rural, or lower-status characters.

During the first half of the 20th century, Broad and Cultivated Australian came to occupy opposite ends of the Australian accent continuum, with General Australian positioned between them. These varieties also developed distinct cultural associations. Cultivated Australian was particularly associated with formal broadcasting, especially on the Australian Broadcasting Corporation (ABC) until the mid-1960s, while Broad Australian became prominent in Australian literature and popular culture, including the works of C. J. Dennis, Afferbeck Lauder's Let Stalk Strine (1965), and the Barry McKenzie character. Following extensive studies of secondary school students across Australia during the early 1960s, Mitchell and Arthur Delbridge later expanded this framework into three accent categories: Broad Australian, spoken by approximately 34% of the population; General Australian, spoken by 55%; and Cultivated Australian, spoken by 11%.

Alastair Ardoch Morrison, under the Strine pseudonym of Afferbeck Lauder (a metaplasm for "Alphabetical Order"), wrote a song "With Air Chew" ("Without You") in 1965 followed by a series of books—Let Stalk Strine (1965), Nose Tone Unturned (1967), Fraffly Well Spoken (1968), and Fraffly Suite (1969). An example from one of the books: "Eye-level arch play devoisters ..." ("I'll have a large plate of oysters"). Contemporary examples include "rise up lights" ("razor blades"). In 2009, Text Publishing, Melbourne, re-published all four books in an omnibus edition. From the mid-20th century through to the late 1980s, exaggerated or highly performative forms of the Broad Australian accent became increasingly prominent in Australian popular culture. Such speech styles were strongly associated with characters including Ted Bullpitt, and Crocodile Dundee, as well as musicians such as Dave Warner and The Angels. Broad Australian vernacular speech also featured prominently in Australian literature and theatre, including the works of John O'Grady and David Williamson.

During the 2000s, linguist John Hajek cited the television series Kath & Kim as an example of Broad Australian speech in contemporary popular culture. Hajek noted that the humour of the series frequently relied on exaggerated vowel pronunciations associated with broader Australian accents, such as the pronunciation of "nice" as "noice". In a 2019 Uber Eats advertisement alongside Magda Szubanski as Sharon Strzelecki from Kath & Kim, Kim Kardashian was taught to pronounce "nice" as "noice" in an exaggerated Australian "Strine" style.

== Decline and convergence ==
Broad Australian is now less commonly heard in everyday speech and is often used primarily in advertising, comedy, or other contexts intended to evoke stereotypical Australian identity. Some linguists have linked this decline to changing social attitudes and demographic shifts within Australian society, as well as the diminishing prestige of Cultivated Australian speech. As both Broad and Cultivated Australian declined in prominence, General Australian became increasingly dominant, with some scholars arguing that it closely resembles the foundational Australian accent that emerged during the early colonial period of the 19th century. The 'Strine' accent had long been associated with Australian republicanism, mateship, larrikin culture, and egalitarian ideals, but it also carried negative stereotypes linked to "ockerism" and perceived lack of sophistication. Linguists have suggested that the decline of Broad Australian may partly reflect changing Australian social attitudes and shifting perceptions of Australia's place in the world. Some researchers have additionally proposed that the accent's decline was influenced by associations with migrant speech varieties that emerged following post–World War II immigration from Southern Europe.

Speech scientists Felicity Cox and Sallyanne Palethorpe have argued that Broad Australian English has declined in prevalence among younger Australians, following a long-term shift toward General Australian pronunciation. Drawing on interviews conducted over a 15-year period with approximately 500 young Australians, the researchers identified movement away from the strongly nasal and flattened vowel qualities associated with stereotypical "ocker" speech and figures such as Paul Hogan, Nathan Rees, Lleyton Hewitt, Steve Irwin, the fictional character Barry McKenzie, and former prime ministers Julia Gillard, Bob Hawke, and John Howard. While Broad Australian has become less common in everyday speech, it continues to appear in advertising, comedy, and other contexts where it is used to evoke stereotypical or symbolic forms of Australian identity.

Cox and Palethorpe described Australian English as a continuum ranging from Broad to Cultivated Australian accents, with most Australians speaking varieties of General Australian located between these extremes. According to Cox, younger speakers increasingly associated strongly Broad Australian accents with negative social connotations, while broader cultural changes and increasing Australian national self-confidence also contributed to declining identification with overtly "ocker" speech styles. The researchers additionally noted that there was little evidence that Australian English was becoming more Americanised in pronunciation, despite the adoption of some American vocabulary and grammatical forms. They also argued that Broad Australian accents were not confined primarily to rural areas nor strictly associated with social class, citing public figures such as Bob Hawke as examples of highly educated Australians who retained broader speech patterns.

== Phonetics ==
Broad Australian English diphthongs
Phoneme	Lexical set	Broad Australian realization
/iː/	FLEECE	[əːɪ]
/ʉː/	GOOSE	[əːʉ]
/æɪ/	FACE	[æ̠ːɪ, a̠ːɪ]
/əʉ/	GOAT	[æ̠ːʉ, a̠ːʉ]
/ɑe/	PRICE	[ɒːe]
/æɔ/	MOUTH	[ɛːo, ɛ̃ːɤ]

In contemporary Australian spoken English, the term Strine is being replaced by Strayan, a word gaining traction in more recent years (although Strine is still used among some populations). In written English, Strine remains more frequently used.

Studies of the Australian accent continuum have identified several phonological differences between Broad and Cultivated Australian English, particularly in the pronunciation of diphthongs. In the PRICE lexical set, including words such as "fine", "wife", and "ride", Broad Australian speakers typically use a more open and fronted diphthong pronunciation, whereas Cultivated Australian speakers employ pronunciations closer to those of Received Pronunciation and some forms of American English.

Differences have also been observed in the MOUTH lexical set, including words such as "south", "proud", and "out". Broad Australian speakers tend to begin the diphthong with a more fronted vowel quality approaching [ɛ], while Cultivated Australian speakers generally use a pronunciation closer to [aʊ]. In the PRICE lexical set, including words such as "buy", speakers of Cultivated Australian English typically employ a higher diphthong pronunciation closer to [aɪ], whereas Broad Australian speakers often use a more lowered and rounded realisation that may resemble the pronunciation of "boy" in some varieties of American English. Additional variation occurs in the FLEECE lexical set, including words such as "fleece" and "keep", where broader accents have been noted to exhibit stronger diphthongisation.

=== Phoneme ===
- /oʊ/ has a lowered first target and a lowered and fronted second target
- /u/ is lowered
- /i/ significant onglide – The degree of this onglide is affected by age and is less marked by younger speakers than older speakers
- /ɜ/ is fronted
- /aʊ/ has a fronted and raised first target
- /eɪ/ has a retracted first target
- /aɪ/ has a retracted and raised first target
- /ɪə/ has a diminished offglide
- /ɛə/ has a diminished offglide

== See also ==
- Diminutives in Australian English
- Monica Dickens
- How to Talk Australians, an online miniseries looking through the eyes of teachers and students at a fictional college
