= The Footy Show =

The Footy Show may refer to the following television programs:

- The Footy Show (AFL), Australian rules football show 1994–2019
- The Footy Show (rugby league), Australian rugby league show 1994–2018
- The Footy Show (1957 TV program), Australian sports television program
