= Afferbeck Lauder =

Australian graphic artist and author (1911–1998)

Afferbeck Lauder was the pseudonym used by Alistair Ardoch Morrison (21 September 1911 – 15 March 1998), an Australian graphic artist and author who in the 1960s documented Strine in the song "With Air Chew" and a series of books beginning with Let Stalk Strine (Ure Smith, Sydney, Australia, 1965). Morrison illustrated the books and also used the pseudonym Al Terego.

Let Stalk Strine was followed by Nose Tone Unturned (1967), Fraffly Well Spoken (1968), and Fraffly Suite (1969). The first two presented Australian written phonetically to appear as another language, the next two lampooned the clipped, almost strangled variety of upper-class English speech in the same way. The titles, and the author pseudonym, are all examples in themselves (Afferbeck Lauder = alphabetical order). Some further examples are:

- Strine – Australian
- "Spewffle climber treely" – It's a beautiful climate, really
- "Emma chisit" – How much is it ?
- "Egg nishner" – air-conditioner
- Fraffly – Frightfully
- "Egg wetter gree" – I quite agree
- "Gray chooma" – Great humour

The books themselves contained no clues as to the identity of the author.

In October 2009 Text Publishing, Melbourne, re-published all four books in the series in an omnibus edition, Strine: The complete works of Professor Afferbeck Lauder.

In the early 1960s Morrison was appointed chairman of the Currency Note Design Group, an advisory committee which assisted with the design of new banknotes which were issued when Australia replaced its pounds, shillings, and pence with "dismal guernsey" (decimal currency) on 14 February 1966. He was the brother of the journalist and playwright Guy Morrison.

== Recognition ==
In 2008 Morrison was inducted in the Australian Graphic Design Association's Hall of Fame.
