= Torres Strait English =

Dialect spoken in Australia

Torres Strait English (called by its speakers T.I. English) is a dialect of the English language spoken by the people of various backgrounds (indigenous Torres Strait Islanders, Malay, Filipino, European, Japanese, etc.) born and raised on Thursday Island and neighbouring islands in Torres Strait, North Queensland, Australia. It is distinct from Torres Strait Creole, though most locals speak both the creole and English. Quite a few locals are also speakers of General Australian English.

Its main phonological characteristic is the retention of English [iː] and [uː] where Australian English has [əi] and [əu] (for example, wheel [ˈwiːl] rather than [ˈwəil], fool [ˈfuːl] rather than [ˈfəul]), while where grammar and the like are concerned, Torres Strait English shows a certain amount of post-Creole characteristics, such as the phrase You for [adjective] (e.g. You for style!) for the English You look/are really [adjective] (You are a real show-off!, alt. You are real cool!), and the almost mandatory use of second personal pronouns in the imperative. Other characteristics of T.I. English follow general non-standard dialects of English such as the use of done for did, run for ran, come for came (i.e. a four-way verb system of present-past-infinitive—ing-form for all verbs), and oncet for once. This is a non-rhotic accent, like Australian and New Zealand dialects.

T.I. English is not a post-creole form, but rather an independent development from the English of the early European settlers, most of whom were from various parts of the world. Relatively few were native-born White Australians. The input dialects were British of various types including Irish, Jamaican and others. Substratum languages include Malay, Japanese, Chinese, Jamaican Creole, Samoan, Brokan and so on.
