= Western Australian English =

Dialect of Australian English found in Western Australia

Western Australian English is the English spoken in the Australian state of Western Australia (WA). Although generally the same as most other Australian English, it has some state-specific words – including slang and Aboriginal words – and variations in pronunciation.

== Vocabulary ==
Some of the vocabulary used in Western Australia is unique, within both Australia and the wider world.

Several terms of British origin have survived which are rarely used in other parts of Australia. One example is verge, meaning the area between a road and a paved footpath, which is known by the term nature strip in the rest of Australia. Another is brook, for a small stream.

Some words have been shortened, for example, the term bathers is commonly used in place of bathing suit. Some original terms have also been invented in WA, and have since found their way into common usage. An example of this is the term home open, describing a house on the market which is open for public inspection ("open house" in other English vernaculars).

Altogether, about 750 words are estimated to be used differently in WA than they are in the eastern states.

There are also many unique, invented slang words, such as ding, referring either to an Australian immigrant of Italian descent (this word is often considered derogatory and/or offensive), or a dent in a car panel. Cursive writing may also often be called running writing in Western Australian primary schools..

A 285-millilitre (10.0 imp fl oz; 9.6 US fl oz) glass of beer is referred to as a middy only in WA and New South Wales.

Many words from Indigenous Australian languages have found their way into Western Australian English. Examples include gidgee (or gidgie), a Noongar word for spear, as used in modern spear fishing; and gilgie (or jilgie), the Noongar name for a small freshwater crayfish of the South West. Crayfish often found in the Perth Hills area may be called yabbies. Another word of likely Aboriginal origin is boondy (pronounced with ʊ, like the vowel in bush), which means a rock, boulder, or small stone. Among Western Australians, the term sand-boondy or more commonly boondy is well-recognised as referring to a small lump of sand (with the granules stuck together), often thrown at one another by children in playgrounds or building sites.

Other Aboriginal words that have been included more widely into relatively common regional Western Australian parlance include "wongi" (talk) and "milli-milli" (paper).

== Phonology ==
Most Western Australians speak with either a general Australian accent or a broad Australian accent. Those who grew up in suburban Perth typically speak with a general Australian accent, and those from regional areas ("from the country") speak with a broad accent.

=== Centring diphthongs ===
Centring diphthongs are the vowels that occur in words like ear, beard and sheer. In Western Australia, there is a tendency for centring diphthongs to be pronounced as full diphthongs. Those in the eastern states will tend to pronounce "fear" and "beer" without any jaw movement, while Western Australians tend pronounce them more like "fe-ah" and "be-ah", respectively.

=== L-vocalisation ===
As also found in South Australian English, the tendency for some /l/ sounds to become vowels (/l/ vocalisation) is more common than other states. "Hurled", for example, in Western Australia has a vocalised [ʊ̯], leading to the pronunciation [hɜːʊ̯d], whereas in other states the /l/ is pronounced as a consonant [ɫ]. The /l/ is vocalised; for example, "milk" sounds like "miuwk" [mɪʊ̯k] and "hill" sounds like "hiw" [hɪʊ̯].

=== Pronunciation of individual words ===
Some pronunciations also differ from those used in the rest of Australia. For example:

- Loquat: people from WA tend to pronounce loquat with a "k" sound /ˈləʉkət/ instead of the "kw" (/ˈləʉkwɔt, -wət/) used elsewhere.
- Derby: both the name of the city in northern Western Australia and the cross-town rivalry or horse race. It is pronounced /ˈdɜːbiː/.

== See also ==
- Variation in Australian English
- Australian English vocabulary
- Australian English phonology
