= Bequia English =

Variety of English

- Region: Bequia
- Language family: Indo-European: Germanic; West Germanic; Ingvaeonic; Anglo-Frisian; Anglic; English; North American English; Caribbean English; Bequia English
- Early forms: Old English: Middle English; Early Modern English

Language codes
- ISO 639-3: –
- Glottolog: None

Bequia English is the local dialect of English spoken on Bequia, an island in Saint Vincent and the Grenadines. It belongs to the group of Caribbean English varieties.

== Phonology ==
=== Consonants ===
Word-initially /t/ and /d/ are dental. Word-final /t/ can be sometimes fully released and sometimes fully deleted, such as in but [bʌ] and about [əbaʷ]. Word-medially /t/ can occur as either a stop or glottal stop, hence after is either [aftə] or [afʔə]. Word-initially H is variably present. The fricatives are pronounced as dentals: 'think' [tɪŋk], 'there' [dɛ]. Nasal backing is common after back vowels: "Hamilton" sounds like [hamɪltɔŋ]. /l/ is normally light in all positions, the /r/ is a retroflex [ɹ] and rhoticity is variable. /str/ is pronounced as /ʃtr/: industry is [ɪndʌʃtri]. Final clusters may be devoiced (kids: [kɪts]) and final stops in clusters can be deleted (respect: [rispɛk]). There is restricted metathesis: words like ask, crisp and crispy are pronounced as [æks], [krɪps], and [krɪpsi]; but mask is pronounced as [ma:s]. /k/ and /g/ tend to be palatalized: Coast Guard [kʲo:s gʲa:d].

=== Vowels ===
The vowels in Kit and Dress are usually [ɪ] and [ɛ], and the vowel in Kit is sometimes lowered to [ɛ] (miracle: [mɛɹəkl]). The vowel in Trap is either [a] or [æ]. The Foot vowel is usually [ʊ], but sometimes [ɔ], and the Lot vowel is usually [ɑ], but sometimes [a]. The vowel in Strut is normally [ʌ], but at times [ɔ] (cup: [kɔp]). The vowels in Fleece and in Goose tend to occur as [i:] and [u:], and the Face and Goat vowels tend to occur as [e:] and [o:], but they can occasionally be [eə] and [oə]. The Bath vowel tends to occur as [a:], though [æ] can also be heard. The Cloth, Thought and Palm vowels tend to occur as [a]. The diphthong in Price is either [aɪ], [ɔɪ] or [əɪ], the diphthong in Mouth is either [aʊ], [ɔʊ] or [əʊ]. The Choice diphthong is usually [ɔɪ], but can be realized as [aɪ]. Hence, choice can be heard as [tʃaɪs] and price can be heard as [pɹɔɪs]. The Nurse vowel is [ə], [ɜ]or [ɔ]; the Near vowels is usually [i:], but can be merged with the Square vowel [e:]. The Start vowel is either [a:] or [ɑ:], the Cure vowel is [ɔ:], and the North and Force vowels are usually merged, though lord tends to sound like [la:d].

=== Rhythm ===
According to Meer, Bequia English has limited vowel reduction and a high tendency toward syllable-timed stress pattern.
