= Cultivated Australian English =

Prestige variety of Australian English

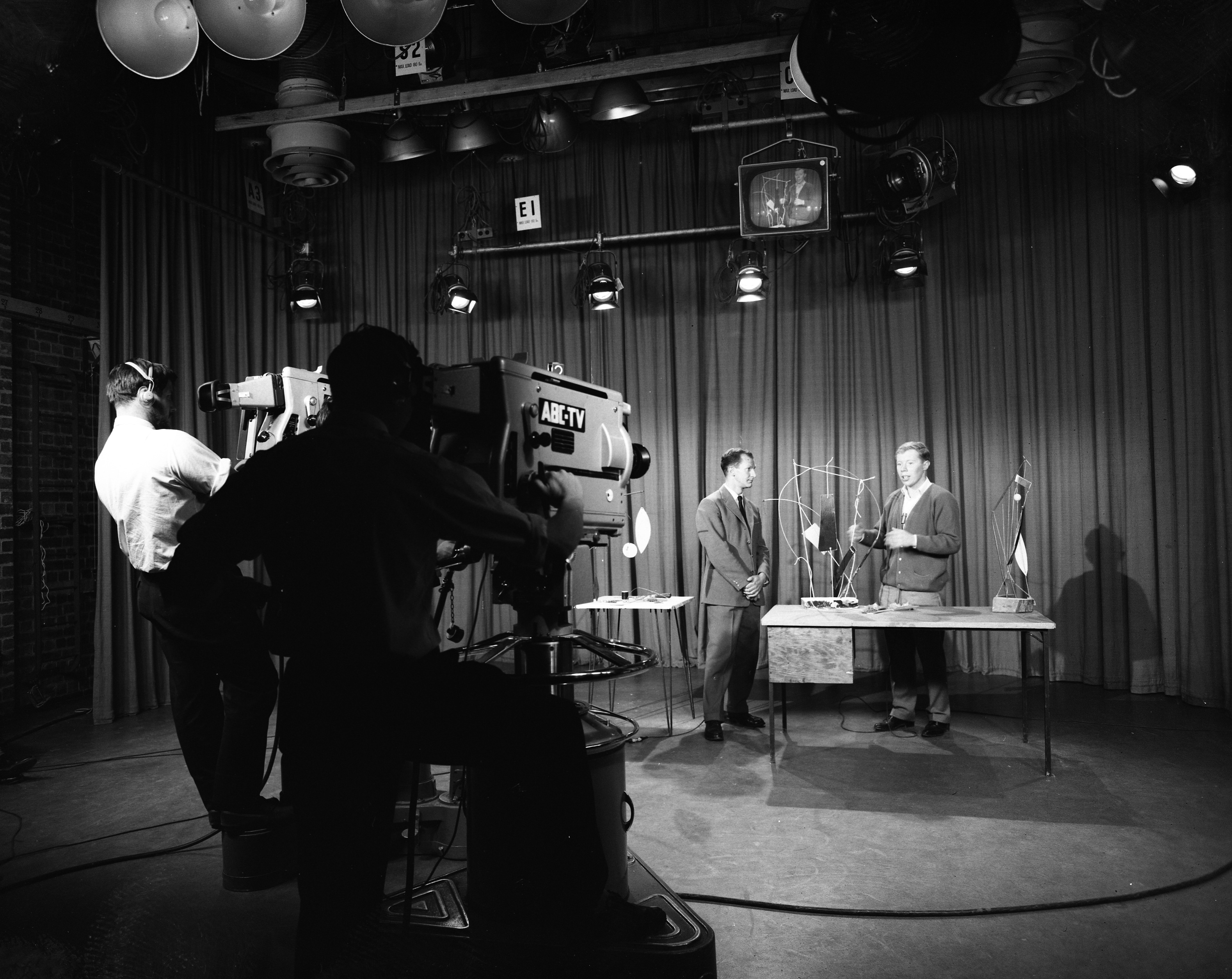
Cultivated Australian pronunciation was historically associated with early Australian Broadcasting Corporation (ABC) newsreaders and broadcasters

Cultivated Australian English, or the Cultivated Australian accent, is a prestige variety of Australian English associated with the cultivated end of the traditional broad–general–cultivated continuum of Australian English pronunciation. Historically linked with formal education and higher social status, it was more common among sections of the Australian upper and middle classes during the 20th century. Also known as the ABC accent, the accent was characterised by strongly British-oriented pronunciation features, sharing some phonological similarities with Received Pronunciation, and was traditionally associated with formal broadcasting, theatre, ABC News, and the media.

From the 1930s onward, Australian society increasingly favoured more prestigious or “acceptable” forms of Australian English. In theatre, Cultivated Australian English (CAE) gradually replaced Received Pronunciation as the dominant stage accent by the 1950s and remained influential for several decades. Broad and General Australian accents did not become firmly established on stage until the New Wave period of the 1970s. During the late 20th century, British-oriented Cultivated Australian speech declined in social prominence and influence. The Cultivated Australian accent is now most commonly associated with archival recordings of former Australian Broadcasting Corporation (ABC) radio announcers. Although the accent has become less prevalent, some speakers of General Australian English retain cultivated phonetic features.

== Historical development ==
There is little evidence for the existence of a distinct Cultivated Australian variety during the 19th century. The promotion of cultivated speech as a model of “correct” or “best” English in Australia coincided with the decline of radical nationalist movements in the 1890s and the emergence of a form of Australian nationalism that remained closely tied to British identity and imperial culture. Political scholar Ben Wellings argued that Australian nationalism in the early 20th century drew heavily upon British traditions and symbols while adapting them to local conditions. Most Australians spoke with the accent that had developed during the first decades of European settlement, which later became known as General Australian. During the 20th century, the Cultivated Australian accent emerged, while a markedly broader “ocker” style of speech developed partly in reaction to the perceived formality and prestige associated with cultivated pronunciation, according to linguist Felicity Cox.

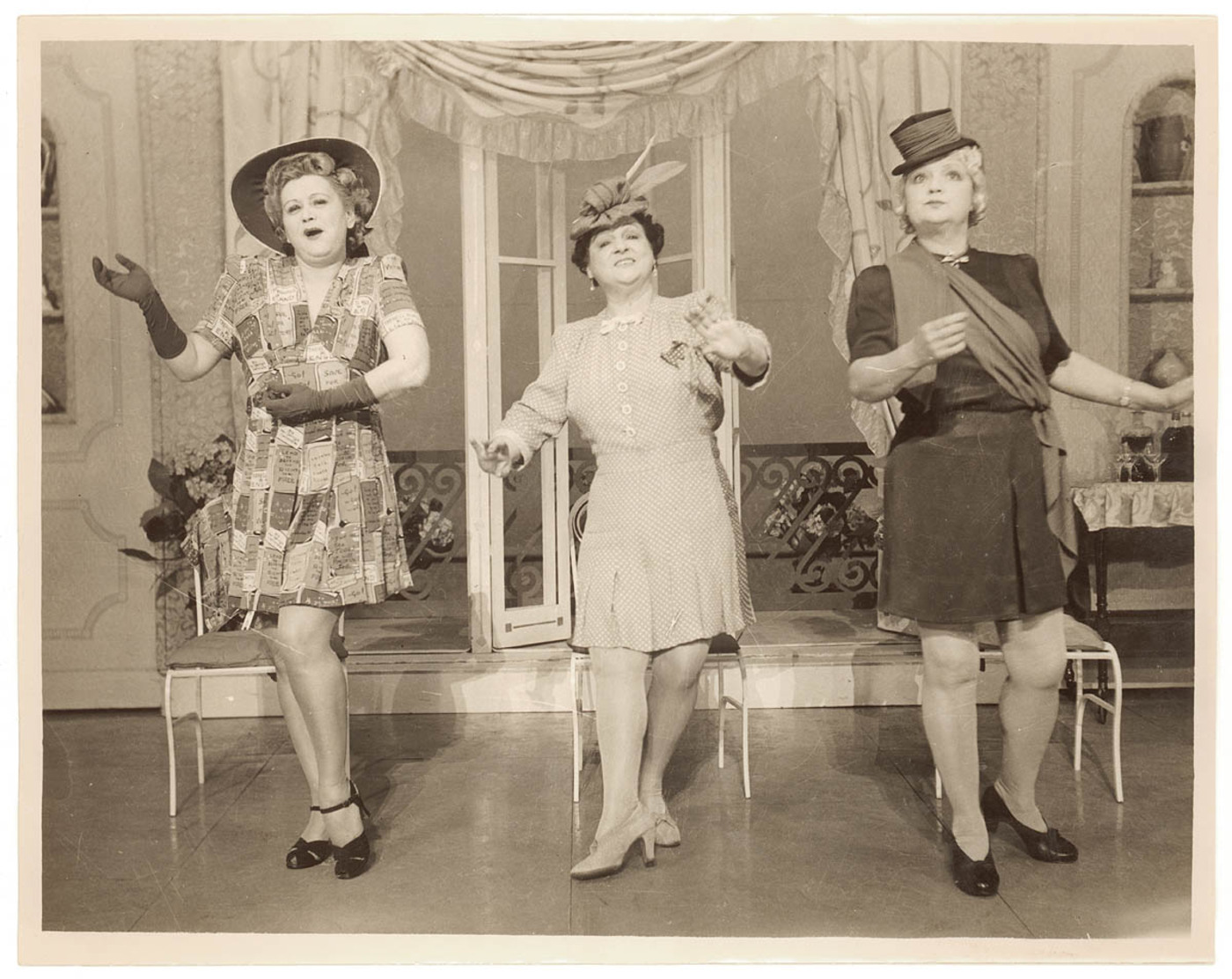
During the 1940s, Australian theatre increasingly promoted Cultivated Australian pronunciation as a standard stage accent.

Linguist Bruce Moore argued that Broad and Cultivated Australian accents likely emerged as social responses to Australia's relationship with Britain, describing them as “aberrations driven by social elements”. According to Moore, Cultivated Australian became associated with loyalty to Britain and the British monarchy, while Broad Australian gained associations with Australian nationalism and anti-British sentiment, particularly during World War I, when it was reportedly used by Australian soldiers as a marker of distinction from British officers. Educationalist Ethel M. Mallarky, writing in 1914, acknowledged that Australian English had diverged from established British speech standards and suggested that the emergence of a distinct Australian mode of speech was a natural development accompanying Australian nationhood, while still engaging with contemporary debates surrounding linguistic prestige and “correct” pronunciation. In 1946, A. G. Mitchell proposed a distinction between “educated Australian” and “broad Australian” speech varieties. Linguists have suggested that the accent later emerged as a result of attempts to approximate Received Pronunciation and other British prestige speech forms.

Radio contributed to debates over acceptable speech standards, leading to the emergence of Cultivated Australian as the preferred broadcasting accent. Similar to developments in Australian radio broadcasting, where a cultivated accent was promoted as a speech standard, some theatre practitioners argued for the adoption of a standardised Australian stage accent. This approach sought to balance Australian national identity with the prestige traditionally associated with British theatrical pronunciation models such as Received Pronunciation (RP). In a 1949 report on Australian theatre, Tyrone Guthrie proposed sending Australian actors to London for training in order to develop a “standardized accent for the Australian stage”, which he believed would help counter cultural cringe and strengthen Australian cultural confidence. Although Guthrie’s proposal was never formally implemented, a standardised theatrical accent gradually emerged in Australian actor training, with Cultivated Australian increasingly replacing RP as the dominant stage pronunciation from the mid-20th century onward.

=== Cultural identity and representation ===
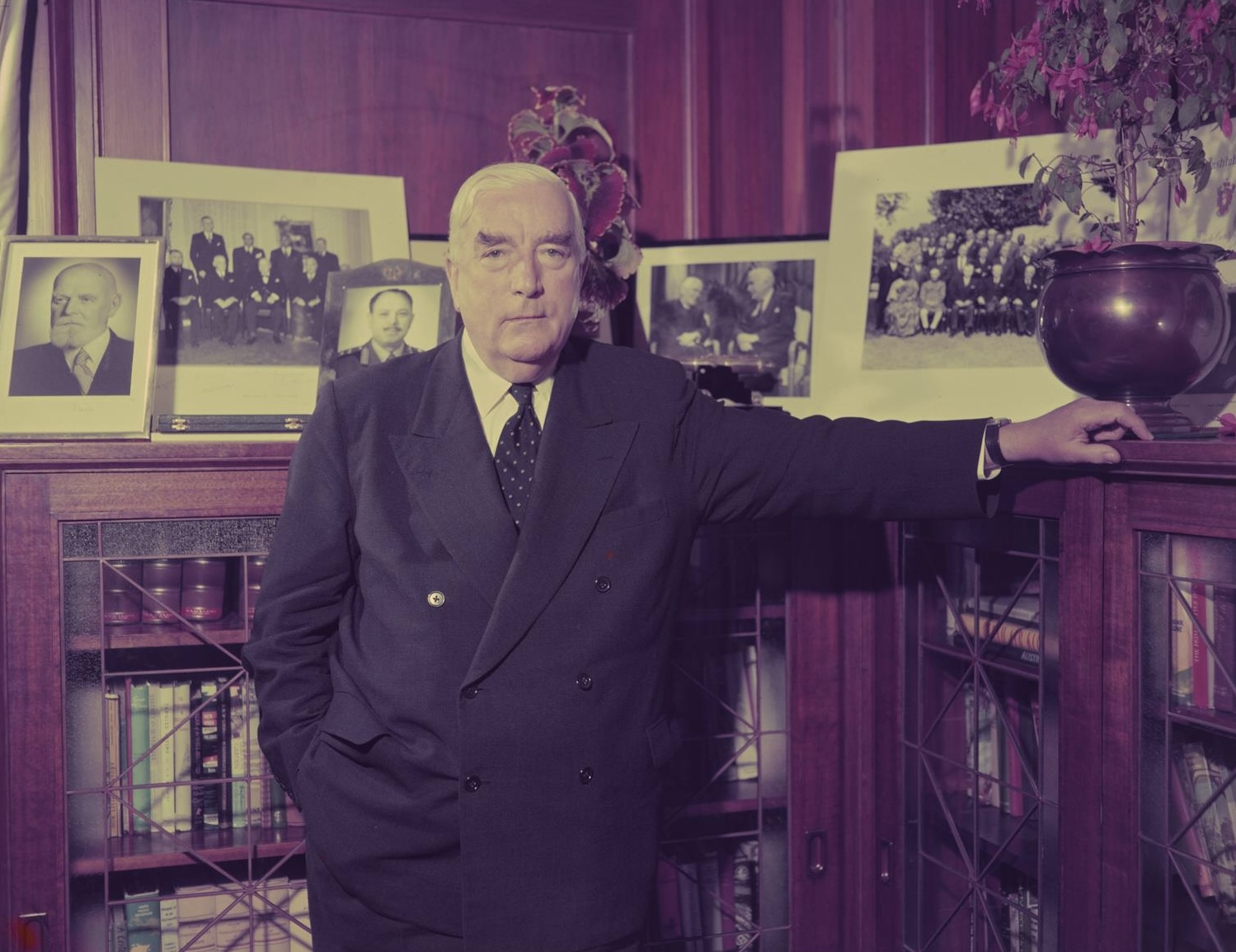
Former prime minister Robert Menzies, noted for his cultivated, British-influenced Australian accent and identification with traditional imperial culture.

The dominance of Cultivated Australian speech in theatre created difficulties when distinctly Australian working-class characters began appearing on stage, particularly following the debut of Ray Lawler’s Summer of the Seventeenth Doll in 1955. The play featured suburban Australian characters and vernacular speech patterns that differed from the cultivated pronunciation traditionally taught in actor training. Director John Sumner recalled that actors initially struggled to produce natural-sounding Australian accents, while Lawler observed that the cast consciously worked on their Australian speech because such accents had rarely been represented in theatre at the time. The play was widely praised for its realistic dialogue and characters, and its success has been regarded as an important step toward greater acceptance of Australian vernacular accents on stage.

Linguists and cultural historians have associated Cultivated Australian English with British cultural influence and imperial identity, while Broad Australian has been linked to vernacular Australian culture and popular nationalism. During the first half of the 20th century, Cultivated and Broad Australian occupied opposite ends of the Australian accent continuum, with General Australian positioned between them. These contrasting varieties also developed distinct cultural associations. Cultivated Australian was strongly associated with formal broadcasting, particularly on the Australian Broadcasting Corporation (ABC) until the mid-1960s, whereas Broad Australian became prominent in Australian popular culture and literature, including the works of C. J. Dennis, the satirical writings of Afferbeck Lauder such as Let Stalk Strine (1965), and the Barry McKenzie character.

Following extensive studies of the speech of secondary school students across Australia during the early 1960s, Mitchell and Arthur Delbridge later expanded this classification into three accent categories: Broad Australian, spoken by approximately 34% of the population; General Australian, spoken by 55%; and Cultivated Australian, spoken by 11%. The office of the prime minister retained strong associations with Cultivated Australian speech until the tenure of Robert Menzies, who left office in 1966 and famously described himself as “British to the bootstraps”, reflecting the continuing prestige of British-oriented cultural identity in Australian public life. Cultivated Australian was often linked to British cultural identification and to attitudes regarded as favouring British social norms and prestige, while Broad Australian became associated with Australian nationalism and egalitarianism, often in contrast to perceptions of Britain as socially hierarchical and class-conscious.

=== Decline and changing prestige ===
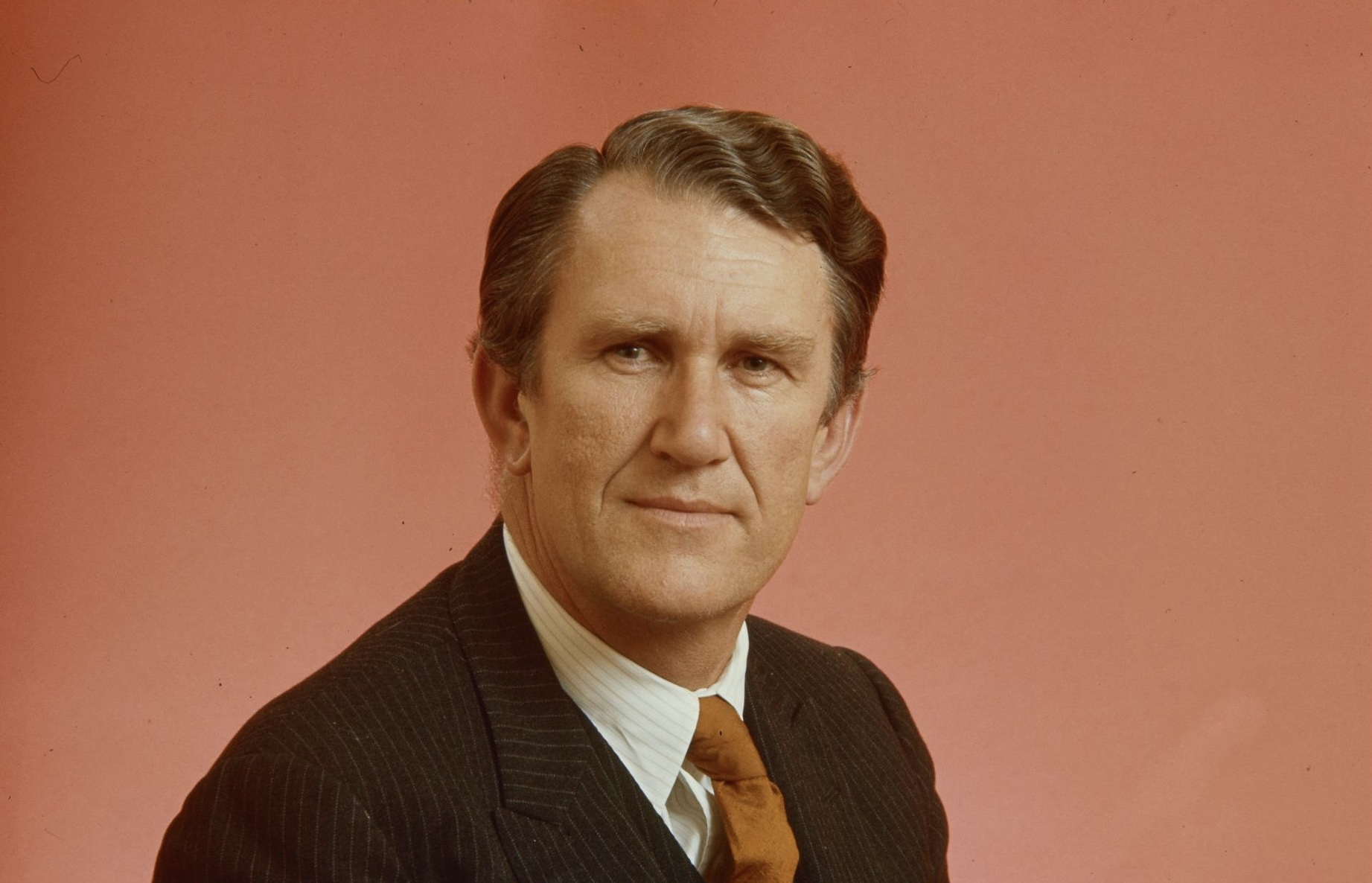
Former prime minister Malcolm Fraser was noted for speaking with a cultivated Australian accent and is the last prime minister to use the variety in public life.

In 1952, the Australian Broadcasting Corporation (ABC) began permitting more distinctly Australian accents in its broadcasts, marking a gradual shift away from exclusively cultivated speech standards. Although Summer of the Seventeenth Doll (1955) departed from the convention of performance in Cultivated Australian speech, it was not until the 1970s that Broad and General Australian accents became more firmly established in Australian theatre. By the late 20th century, Australian English had become widely accepted as a national standard, while both Cultivated and Broad Australian declined in prominence. Since the 1970s, Cultivated Australian has largely lost its former prestige as the Australian national identity became less closely associated with British linguistic norms, and the accent is often perceived as socially marked rather than advantageous in contemporary Australia.

Anglo-centric speech standards in mainstream Australian English remained dominant during the 1960s and 1970s, while First Nations voices were largely confined to fringe and alternative venues. Cultivated Australian continued to retain prominence during this period, though Broad and General Australian varieties increasingly appeared in certain theatrical productions, characters, and narratives. Linguist Jenny Price, whose doctoral research examined Australian newsreaders between 1951 and 2005, identified a gradual shift in broadcasting away from Cultivated Australian towards General Australian speech patterns. Price stated that early Australian broadcasting adopted speech models influenced by Received Pronunciation and the BBC, reflecting contemporary views that General Australian speech was excessively nasal or careless. According to Price, later developments in television and recording technology enabled broader representation of everyday Australian speech in broadcasting, contributing to the decline of the cultivated broadcasting accent traditionally associated with the Australian Broadcasting Corporation (ABC).

Linguist John Hajek of the University of Melbourne stated that Cultivated Australian English was widely regarded as a prestige accent until the 1970s, particularly in speech and drama training. Linguist Margaret Loakes stated that earlier linguistic research suggested younger Australians were increasingly shifting away from Broad and Cultivated Australian accents toward General Australian, though more recent studies indicate that changes in Australian English are more complex and variable across communities. Loakes noted that multiple ongoing sound changes exist within Australian speech communities, some of which may become more widespread over time while others may not. By 2010, Australian political figures had largely abandoned the British-influenced broadcasting style once associated with the BBC, though many continued to adopt more careful and moderated speech patterns in public settings. Archival recordings of the Cultivated Australian accent indicate that this style of speech has become less prominent in modern broadcasting. Several ABC presenters interviewed in 2024 stated that the broadcaster no longer places the same emphasis on maintaining a uniform cultivated accent among its presenters and reporters.

== Contemporary representation ==
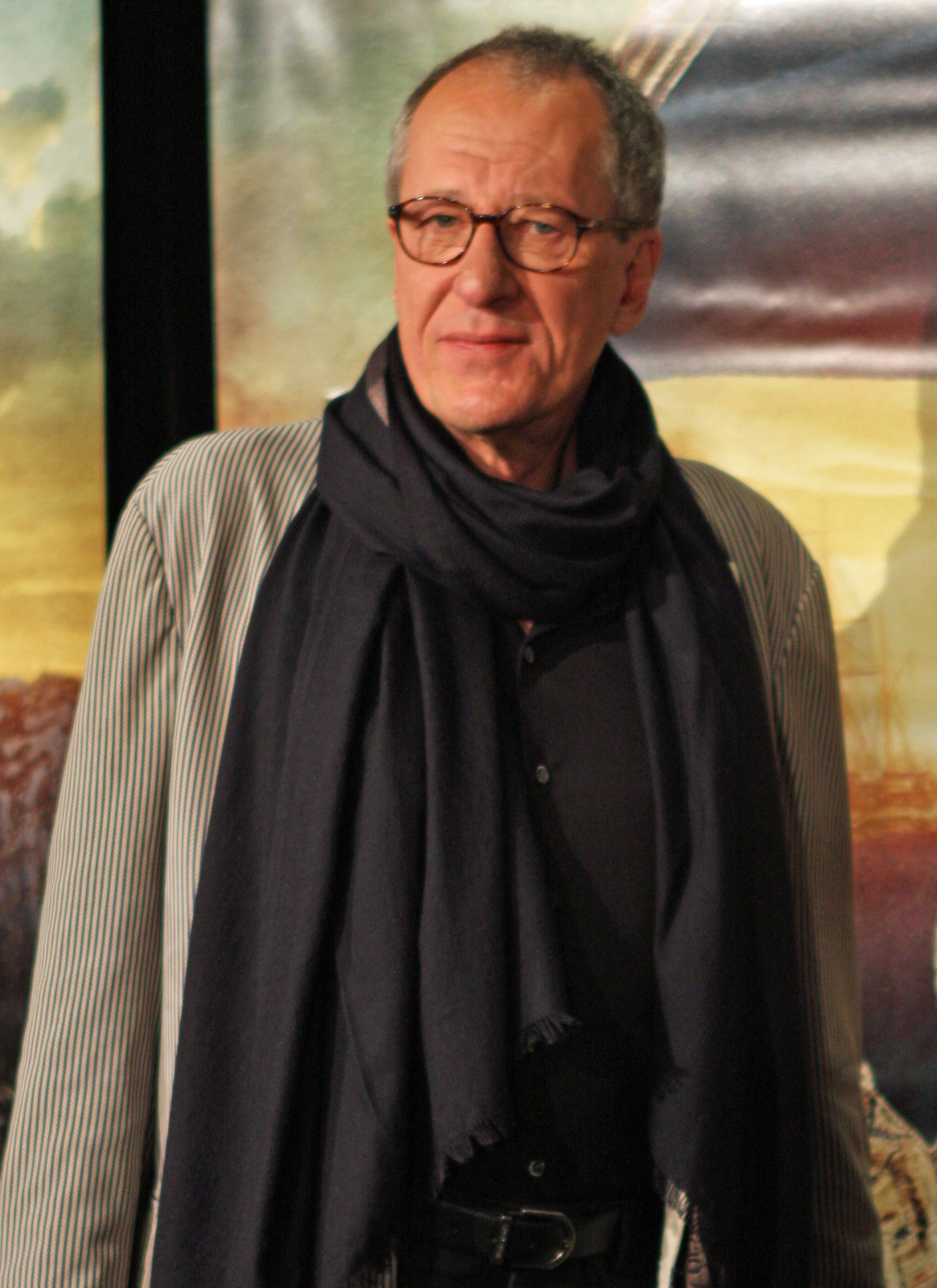
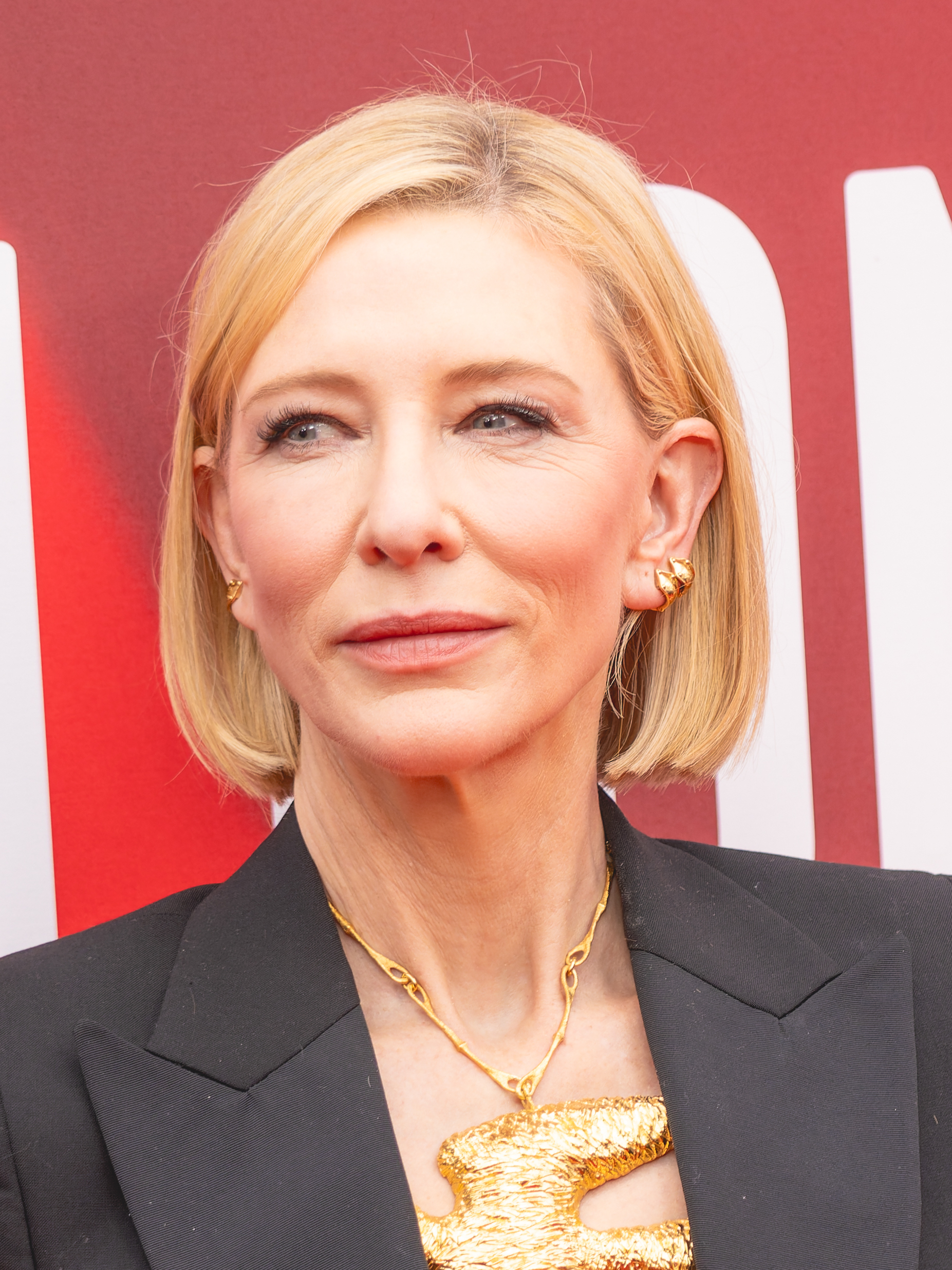
Actor Geoffrey Rush and actress Cate Blanchett, contemporary speakers of Cultivated Australian English

Linguists have observed that Australian radio and television broadcasts from the 1950s to the 1970s often featured speech styles that sounded markedly more British-influenced than contemporary Australian English. Although the broadcasters themselves were Australian, their pronunciation reflected broadcasting standards partly modelled on British speech norms. Professor Roland Sussex stated that Australian speech patterns have increasingly converged toward General Australian English, with fewer speakers using strongly Cultivated Australian accents than in previous generations. General Australian speakers have traditionally been perceived as speaking with relatively unmarked or neutral accents, while Cultivated Australian speakers, despite retaining distinctly Australian speech patterns, have often been regarded as approximating an internationally recognisable educated form of English that minimises overt markers of national origin.

The Cultivated Australian accent has been described as “still heard today”; contemporary speakers associated with the accent include Cate Blanchett, Julie Bishop, Alexander Downer, Judy Davis, Lisa Gerrard, Nicole Kidman, Geoffrey Rush and the late Heath Ledger. Moreover, researchers have identified cultivated phonetic features within the speech of some General Australian speakers, including John Anderson, Kevin Rudd, Sandra Sully, Hugo Weaving, Andrew Bolt, Ann Sanders and the late Bert Newton. Voice lecturer Amy Hume of the Victorian College of the Arts stated that drama school training has shifted away from teaching fixed prestige accents, including Cultivated Australian and Received Pronunciation, instead emphasising the ability of actors to adopt a wider range of accents and vocal styles. Dialect coach Alexandra Whitham noted that some Australian actors have historically been trained to use more cultivated or internationally adaptable accents suited to work in the United Kingdom or the United States. In Gladiator (2000), Russell Crowe, portraying Maximus, used a mixed Cultivated Australian and British-inflected accent.

The female voice used in Sydney Trains announcements, provided by Taylor Owynns, has been noted for its refined Australian accent, reflecting the continued association of carefully moderated Australian speech with clarity and professionalism in public broadcasting and announcements. Linguist John Hajek cited Kath & Kim as an example of Australian accent stereotypes in popular culture, noting that the characters Prue and Trude employ exaggerated cultivated upper-class speech patterns. Since 2005, Australian voice actress Donna Burke has provided the English-language announcements on Japan’s busiest high-speed rail line in what she described as a “posh Aussie” accent inspired partly by Cate Blanchett, while adapting the intonation style of the original Japanese announcements. The Cultivated accent is still occasionally used in television commercials to convey elegance, refinement, sophistication, or luxury, particularly in advertisements for premium foods, wine, and other products associated with prestige or upper-class lifestyles, distinguishing them from the working-class accents commonly used in advertisements for products such as mainstream beer, sports betting, and utility vehicles.

== Class and social perceptions ==
Speech example
An example of a man from Queensland with a cultivated accent (Geoffrey Rush).

A 1989 study reported that speakers of Cultivated Australian English were rated more highly than speakers of Broad Australian English in terms of intelligence, competence, reliability, honesty, and social status. Linguist John Hajek stated that broader Australian accents have historically been associated with lower levels of formal education and working-class identity, while Cultivated Australian accents were more commonly associated with higher education and wealth. Hajek also noted that earlier generations of Australians frequently undertook speech and elocution training intended to encourage more “proper” or British-sounding speech patterns, reflecting the historical prestige associated with cultivated pronunciation.

Outside affluent areas stereotypically associated with upper-class speech, such as the Melbourne suburb of Brighton, the Cultivated Australian accent has largely declined in everyday use. Linguist Bruce Moore suggested that this decline reflects the diminishing cultural significance of Australia’s historical social and linguistic ties to Britain within contemporary Australian society. Linguists and historians have also linked this shift to the growth of Australian nationalism, changing cultural attitudes toward British identity, and the increasing study and recognition of Australian English as a distinct national variety. In contemporary Australia, linguist Felicity Cox has argued that the Cultivated Australian accent may be perceived negatively in some social contexts. Cox stated that many Australians regard the accent as inconsistent with contemporary Australian social values and identity. Older generations of Australians who spoke with cultivated speech patterns typically grew up during a period in which British-oriented Received Pronunciation was widely regarded as prestigious and socially desirable in Australia. Therefore, older Australians, particularly from higher social classes, were more likely to speak with accents associated with Cultivated Australian English.

Linguists have argued that Australian accents carry differing levels of social prestige depending on context and that speakers may alter their speech patterns according to social setting or purpose. As an example, former prime minister Bob Hawke, often popularly associated with a Broad Australian accent, adopted more cultivated pronunciations in formal contexts, such as during his Boyer Lectures. Linguist Eric Richards stated that General Australian English, sometimes referred to historically as “middle Australian”, predominated before the later emergence of Broad and Cultivated Australian accents. Richards argued that Australians born during the 1880s and 1890s generally spoke with a relatively uniform middle Australian accent, as the more socially differentiated Broad and Cultivated varieties had not yet developed. According to Richards, these later accent forms emerged partly in response to the influence of the elocution movement and changing attitudes toward speech and social identity. Linguists have noted that speakers of ethnocultural Australian varieties may also display elements associated with Cultivated Australian speech.

== Phonology ==
Cultivated Australian English diphthongs
Phoneme	Lexical set	Cultivated Australian realization
/iː/	FLEECE	[ɪi]
/ʉː/	GOOSE	[ʊu]
/æɪ/	FACE	[ɛɪ]
/əʉ/	GOAT	[ö̞ʊ]
/ɑɪ/	PRICE	[a̠e]
/æɔ/	MOUTH	[a̠ʊ]

Compared with General Australian English, cultivated speech is typically characterised by pronunciation features closer to southern British English, though it remains distinctly Australian. The cultivated pronunciations ɛɪ in the FACE lexical set and [aɪ] in PRICE have been incorporated into the speech of some General Australian speakers. The pronunciation [ɪi] for the FLEECE lexical set also falls within the General Australian range, as the ongliding of /iː/ varies among speakers. Linguists Jonathan Harrington, Felicity Cox and Zoë Evans describe Cultivated Australian English as the variety of Australian English whose vowel pronunciations are closest to Received Pronunciation (RP). Their 1997 acoustic study found that General Australian typically occupies an intermediate position between Broad and Cultivated Australian on the Australian accent continuum, particularly in the pronunciation of diphthongs such as those in the FACE, PRICE, and GOAT lexical sets.

Studies of the Australian accent continuum have identified several phonological differences between Broad and Cultivated Australian English, particularly in the pronunciation of diphthongs. In the PRICE lexical set, including words such as “fine”, “wife”, and “ride”, Broad Australian speakers typically use a more open and fronted diphthong pronunciation, whereas Cultivated Australian speakers employ pronunciations closer to those of Received Pronunciation and some forms of American English. Differences have also been observed in the MOUTH lexical set, including words such as “south”, “proud”, and “out”. Broad Australian speakers tend to begin the diphthong with a more fronted vowel quality approaching [ɛ], while Cultivated Australian speakers generally use a pronunciation closer to [aʊ]. In the PRICE lexical set, including words such as “buy”, speakers of Cultivated Australian English typically employ a higher diphthong pronunciation closer to [aɪ], whereas Broad Australian speakers often use a more lowered and rounded realisation that may resemble the pronunciation of “boy” in some varieties of American English.

Mitchell and Delbridge observed that the differences between Cultivated Australian English and Received Pronunciation can be subtle and may require careful listening to identify, though they argued that the distinctions remain significant despite their relative closeness. The pronunciation of words such as “dance” with a broad /ɑː/ vowel, sometimes stereotypically associated with Cultivated Australian speech or with speakers from Adelaide, has often carried social connotations of upper-class or formal speech in Australia. Some linguists have speculated that pronunciations such as “darnce” and “charnce” may have become particularly prominent in Adelaide due to the city’s origins as a free settlement, distinguishing it culturally and socially from the convict colonies of eastern Australia. Variation has likewise been identified in the FACE lexical set, including words such as “face” and “make”, with cultivated pronunciations tending to align more closely with British prestige forms. Some descriptions of Cultivated Australian English have also noted differences in the pronunciation of intervocalic /t/. Compared with broader Australian accents, cultivated speech more commonly retains a clearer alveolar t articulation in words such as “water” and “city”, whereas General and Broad Australian accents more frequently realise the consonant as a voiced flap ɾ, similar to many forms of North American English.

== See also ==
- Good American Speech
- Queen's Latin
- Northeastern elite accent
