= Kilt accessories =

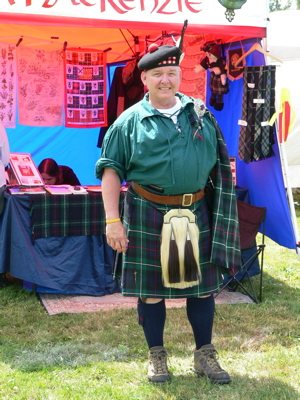
An example of the eclectic style often seen at modern-day Highland games gatherings

The modern, tailored kilt which is ubiquitous at Highland games gatherings around the world has associated with it an evolving style of wear. This style includes the accessories and other accoutrements which are typically worn with it. In this sense, it is very much like other items of the fashion world.

Along with this development, a range of opinion concerning proper, appropriate, or even correct styles has also developed. Attitudes range from those who hold very firm views on the etiquette of how, where, and with what, to wear the kilt, to those with more relaxed views, such as is represented by the following quotation from Matthew Newsome's Patented Advice for the First-Time Kilt Wearer:

Remember that when it comes to modern fashions of Highland dress, what you will read will simply be the opinion of the author and nothing more. Note, I said "modern fashions of Highland dress." When it comes to historical matters, we can certainly say what people did and did not wear, as a matter of fact. But this doesn't need to dictate what you can or cannot wear at present. When it comes to this, there are no rules, only opinions, and you can choose to give as little or as much weight to them as you wish. Keep this in mind throughout. Unless you are a member of a military regiment, a pipe band, or some other quasi-military group that has a specific dress code, your kilt is not a uniform. It is an article of clothing, just like your trousers, and you should feel free to accessorize it however you think best.

== Daywear and evening wear ==
Traditionalists insist that unornamented brown leather belts, sporrans, and shoes should be worn for daywear. Black leather and silver ornamentation are reserved for evening wear (white tie, black tie, or mess dress). A gentleman's Argyll jacket in tweed or solid color is suitable for daywear for those occasions that would usually require a sports jacket or lounge suit, while an Argyll Jacket in black or a Prince Charlie jacket are suitable for evening wear. With some ensembles, a fly plaid is added in the form of a pleated cloth in the same tartan as the kilt, cast over the shoulder and fastened below the shoulder with a plaid brooch.

In addition, many kilt wearers have opted for a jacketless approach, especially at hot summer Highland games gatherings. One style of shirt which is quite common at Highland gatherings is the grandfather shirt, or the Jacobite shirt. These are modern reproductions (or at least reasonably close facsimiles) of the older, pre-Culloden style of shirt. These are full cut shirts with an open, lace-up collar and come in at least a small variety of colors.

== Headgear ==
At modern Highland gatherings, participants in Highland attire can be seen wearing a wide variety of headgear, most going without any headgear at all. But there are two types in particular in widespread usage which are most distinctly Scottish, the Balmoral and the Glengarry.

The Balmoral (named after Balmoral Castle, near Aberdeen, Scotland) is a round, brimless cap, flat on top, with trailing ribbons, and with a ball on top called a toorie. It is often worn with a clan crest badge, and in pipe-band uniform with a hackle.

The Glengarry is another type of cap, somewhat wedge-shaped, longer than wider, creased lengthwise on the top, and with trailing ribbons. It is named after Glengarry valley in Inverness-shire in Scotland.

Both types come in a variety of colors, but black is most usual. And in both cases, there can be dicing around the band of the cap (typically for pipe-band uniform). Both styles will also come with a place on the side of the cap for affixing a clan crest badge.

== Belts ==
A modern, tailored kilt, with its tapered pleats (tapered from seat to waist) is fastened about the body securely enough with the buckles and straps which are provided for that purpose. The kilt belt worn with such kilts is purely decorative during ceremonial use. They are typically fairly wide - between 2 - 1/2 and 3 inches or so - and come in black or brown leather.

Historically, before the advent of the tailored kilt in the late-18th century, some type of belt was necessary in order to secure the kilt about the person and keep it from falling down. It also provided a handy place from which to hang sword, dirk, or pistols. Today the belt, and associated loops on the kilt modern, remains useful for those wearing the kilt in work environments of all kinds.

It is common to see belts worn with a Prince Charlie jacket and waistcoat in evening dress (generally among wearers of hired outfits at weddings etc.). This is regarded as incorrect among traditionalists. The proper reason being that the belt buckle is obscured by the waistcoat and that the line of the tailoring is disrupted by the bulk of the belt, thus making the effect of the costume less flattering to the wearer.

== Sporran ==
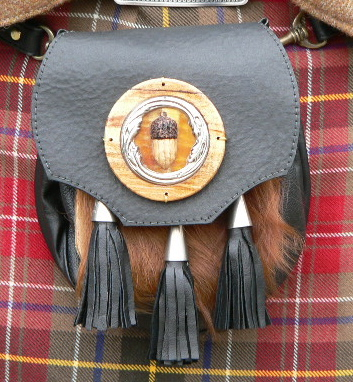
Sporran.

As a kilt was traditionally manufactured without pockets for carrying such things as car keys or wallet, it is still worn with a type of pouch called a sporran, which is just the Gaelic word for pouch or purse. Sporrans are usually made from either brown or black leather.

Sporrans come in a very wide range of styles, from simple leather sporrans to those with fur fronts or fur-trimmed and faced with silver or some other metal. Often, the kilt wearer will choose a type of sporran depending on the occasion, with the more elaborate ones being considered suitable for evening wear and the others for casual or all-purpose wear.

The older style bag sporrans are also frequently seen as they tend to be a bit roomier than some of the more modern varieties.

The sporran is typically suspended from a sporran belt which is a narrow belt (separate from the kilt belt) made of leather or chain. This sporran belt is sometimes run through a pair of small loops provided for that purpose on the back of the kilt. Occasionally the sporran is suspended from special leather belt loops which enable the sporran to be hung directly from the kilt belt. This is often done when a chain is used as the chain might otherwise chafe the kilt.

It is not unheard of for individuals to sew small pockets on the front of the kilt, underneath the apron, to keep necessities such as wallet or keys in.

In the modern world kilts are coming with stylish side and back pockets and it has decreased the demand of sporran, but to be traditional, people wear sporran at the front of modern kilts as well.

== Jewellery ==
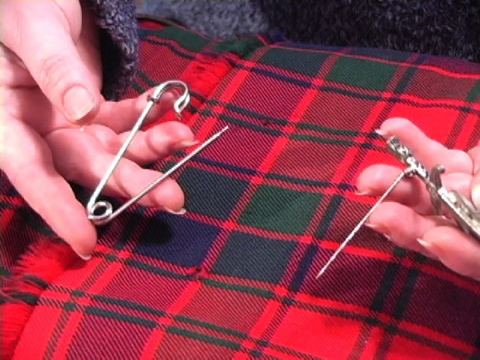
Two types of kilt pins

A small knife called a sgian-dubh is often worn tucked into the top of the kilt hose which is commonly worn with the kilt. This item has its historical origins as a utility knife. Again, as with most items of traditional Scottish apparel and accessories, they come in a very wide variety, from fairly plain to quite elaborate silver and gem ornamented designs. A longer knife, called a dirk is sometimes worn hung from the kilt belt.

On the front apron of a kilt, near the selvedge and the open, fringed part of the apron, you will often see a kilt pin, often topped with a small decorative clan crest or other similar design. Typically, the rule for the placement of the kilt pin is such that it must be two pattern squares over and up from the edge of the kilt fabric.

Two styles of kilt pins can be seen in the accompanying photo. (Note the kilt damage resulting from using the thick-shanked version, however.) This is a decorative item meant to be pinned through the outer apron only. It is not heavy enough to prevent the kilt apron from blowing open in a breeze. It should never be pinned through both aprons, since this would result in distorting the proper hang and action of the kilt and at worst could result in tearing the kilt. Of course, Highland dancers do not wear the pin through both aprons (when they wear one at all) since the action of the kilt is an essential part of the dance.

Often, a clan crest badge will be pinned to cockade on the left side of the Balmoral or Glengarry.

== Footwear and hose ==
Dance ghillies or (for more general wear) ghillie brogues, are a modern development of the brogue used by highlanders. They were made with hide punctured with holes to let water out (as well as in) and this helped feet and footwear to dry out more quickly in the wet/damp/ boggy conditions. These shoes are laced through leather tangs and do not have the tongue which covers the bridge of the foot in normal shoes. The high lacing helped prevent the shoe from being sucked off by mud. Though the ghillie brogue is now considered the normal style of Scottish dress footwear, most of the population probably more often wore the modern brogue with tongue and laces (known in the States as 'wingtips').

Members of pipe bands often wear Ghillie brogues, and many other kilt wearers wear the same type of footgear. As always, there is a great variety in style, with many kilt wearers using black dress shoes or casual footwear. Highland dancers wear a much lighter type of footgear specially adapted to the active requirements of the dancer called dancing ghillies.

With the historical great kilt (or belted plaid), a type of medieval bag shoe was worn. This was a shoe made from a single piece of leather which was cut to a pattern and folded up and around the foot, being secured with a length of leather.

Kilt hose are long stockings normally worn knee-high with the upper part of the hose folded back down to create a thicker cuff just below the knee. They are made of wool or Acrylic or some combination thereof and are available in a variety of solid colors so as to match any tartan colour. They can also be found in diced patterns, which are required wear for Highland dancers. The most common colour of hose however, is the cream, or 'off-white' hose, the colour of unbleached wool. Pipers often wear brilliant white 'pipers hose' made of entirely synthetic fibre. Piper hose differs also in that the top of the hose has a 'built-in' cuff with a raised texture. The "Lassie" and "Laddie" characters from WeeSing's Grandpa's Magical Toys wear white hose as part of their fictionalized Scottish costumes.

Garter flashes are elasticated straps worn inside the cuff of the hose to hold them in place. The flashes are short strips of fabric hanging from the garter, mostly matching the tartan or complementary in colour to the kilt fabric.

== Weapons ==
The use of traditional Scottish weapons as part of Highland dress is common, including the sgian dubh worn in a hose top on the leg corresponding to the dominant hand, and the ceremonial dirk suspended from the waistbelt. At one time worn as secondary armament by a clansman going into battle, both items are today ornamental and often worn by civilians and soldiers alike, subject to the dress regulations of any organization they may belong to.

== Military accessories ==
Highland and Scottish regiments that have adopted kilts as their dress uniform typically wear spats, webbing belts, and kilts with pleating to the line. Spats are canvas coverings that cover the wearer's boot, and were originally intended for keeping mud off of one's ghillies and hose, although spats are now white and purely for visual use. A white web belt with a regimental clasp is often worn as well. During World War I kilts were worn into battle by British and Canadian regiments, usually with a fabric cover or apron to hide the bright colours of the tartan, and to keep the kilt from getting dirty if the soldier had to crawl.

== Undergarments ==
While not strictly an "accessory" of Highland or Scottish dress, the subject of undergarments has been of long-standing interest to observers. Highland dancers and athletes are bound by the nature of their competitions to appropriately and modestly clad themselves. In Highland Dance competitions and exhibitions, the regulations of the Scottish Official Board of Highland Dancing (SOBHD) state regarding underwear: "dark or toning with the kilt should be worn but not white."

Matthew Newsome, in his Patented Advice article (op. cit.) states simply: "... this decision is ultimately up to you. I'll repeat - unless you are in a military unit, or a pipe band, or some other group that has a uniform requirement - your kilt is not a uniform, but an article of clothing, like your trousers or anything else, that you can wear and accessorize as you see fit." Kilts are worn in relation to undergarments in various different styles, with some men choosing to wear no underwear, and others choosing boxer shorts or briefs or thong underwear. There is no rule on what a man should or should not wear under their kilt.

== See also ==
- Inverness cape

== Photo gallery ==
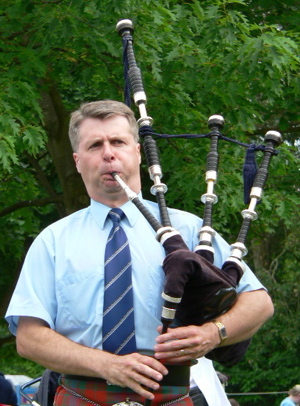
Jack Lee, former pipe major of the Simon Fraser University Pipe Band

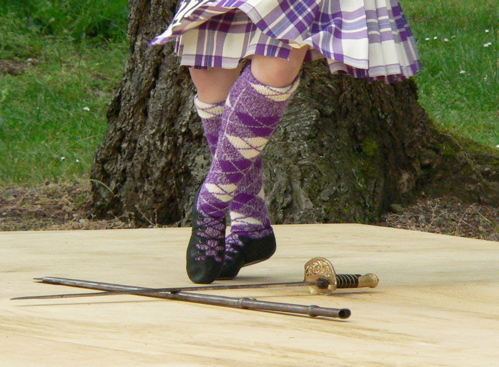
Dancing ghillies

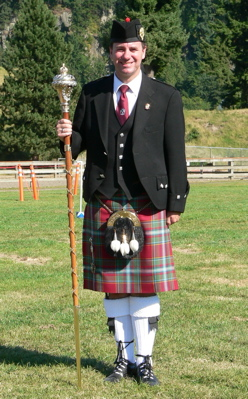
Drum major wearing a Glengarry bonnet
