= Doublet (Highland dress) =

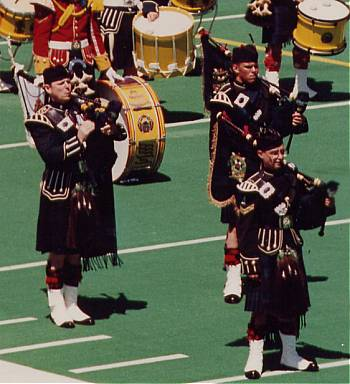
Calgary Highlanders Pipes and Drums with the serving CDS General John de Chastelain (left), 30 June 1990

Doublet is the term describing any of several types of jacket worn with Scottish highland dress; referring to both uniform and evening jackets.

Uniform doublets are found in a number of different styles. Commonly they are short cut with four Inverness flaps skirt and buttoned gauntlet cuffs. It can be any colour depending upon the regiment. It is also used by civilian pipe bands.

== Formal jackets ==
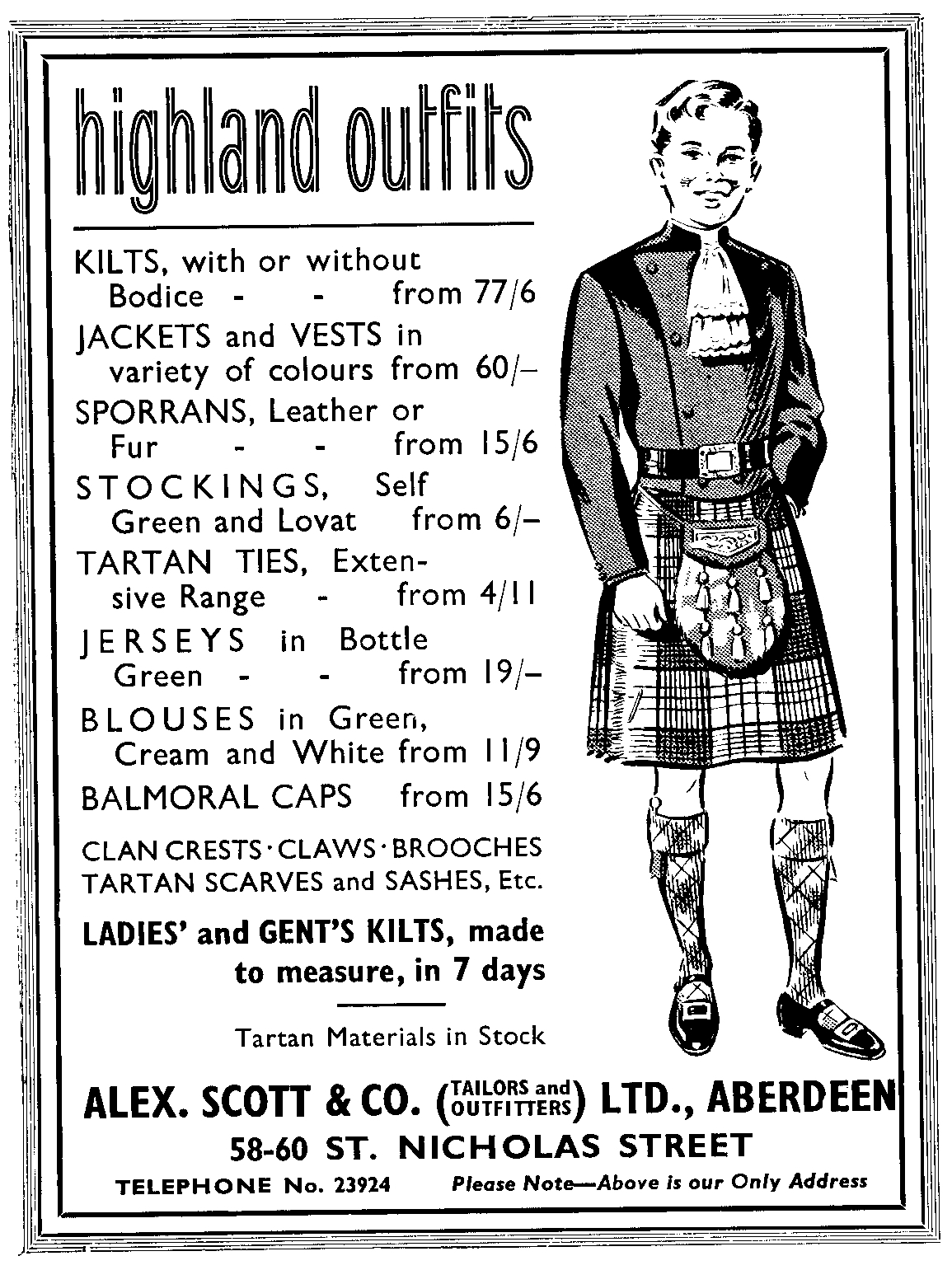
Advertisement for Highland dress depicting a variant of the double breasted Montrose Doublet.

As with both uniform doublets and civilian dress, there are a number of styles of jacket or doublet suitable for wear with highland dress. Kinloch Anderson, one of the older makers of highland dress in Scotland, considers the "Coatee and Vest" (often called the Prince Charlie Jacket), Argyll Jacket, Regulation Doublet, Montrose Doublet, Sheriffmuir Jacket or Kenmore jacket" suitable for "black tie" evening wear, with all except the Argyll Jacket also considered acceptable for "white tie" events. The Argyll jacket and tweed jackets are appropriate for day wear. Different tailors describe similar jackets using different names.

This garment is similar to a mess jacket, with buttoned gauntlet cuffs, short or no skirts, and with or without lapels. It may have a row of silver heraldic buttons on each side. It may be worn with a lace jabot and cuff set, and a high-buttoned waistcoat. It is typically made of velvet or wool, with satin lapels, and may feature epaulettes. The highland doublet is jacobean in style and may date to that period or earlier. Variation may be called an Argyll jacket or Prince Charlie jacket (or coatee).

== Varieties ==
The Regulation doublet is typically black barathea or coloured velvet with silk-faced peaked lapels, buttoned gauntlet cuffs, and epaulettes, similar to the Prince Charlie coatee, which it pre-dates. Unlike the coatee, which is cut like a mess jacket, the doublet has braided "tashes" (otherwise known as Inverness skirts/flaps) at the front and back. The Regulation doublet was at one time the regulation uniform jacket of the Highland regiments and is worn with a three-button waistcoat which may be made from the same cloth as the jacket, white piqué, or tartan cloth. The doublet should be worn with a black silk bow tie for black tie events, and either a white piqué bow tie, or a lace jabot for white tie events.

The Balmoral doublet is a single-breasted jacket traditionally made from velvet. It is usually worn with a belt and black bow tie.

The Montrose doublet (as defined by Kinloch Anderson) is "a double breasted short cut evening jacket with high collar. There are ten symmetrically positioned Celtic buttons on front, three Celtic buttons on each cuff and epaulettes with Celtic buttons on each shoulder". It is normally worn with a belt, lace jabot, and lace cuffs, and may be made from black barathea or velvet.

The Kenmore doublet is a single-breasted doublet, worn buttoned up (no lapels) and without a waistcoat. It is traditionally made from velvet and is always worn with a belt, lace jabot and cuffs. It may be worn on all formal occasions. It is named after the town of Kenmore which lies at the east of Loch Tay.

The Sheriffmuir doublet is a doublet with gauntlet cuffs and a stand collar with no lapels. It is typically worn open with a waistcoat, lace jabot and cuffs. Sheriffmuir lies between Dunblane and Stirling overlooking the Allan Water. In 1715 a battle was fought here between the Jacobites under the Earl of Mar and the Government forces under the Duke of Argyll.

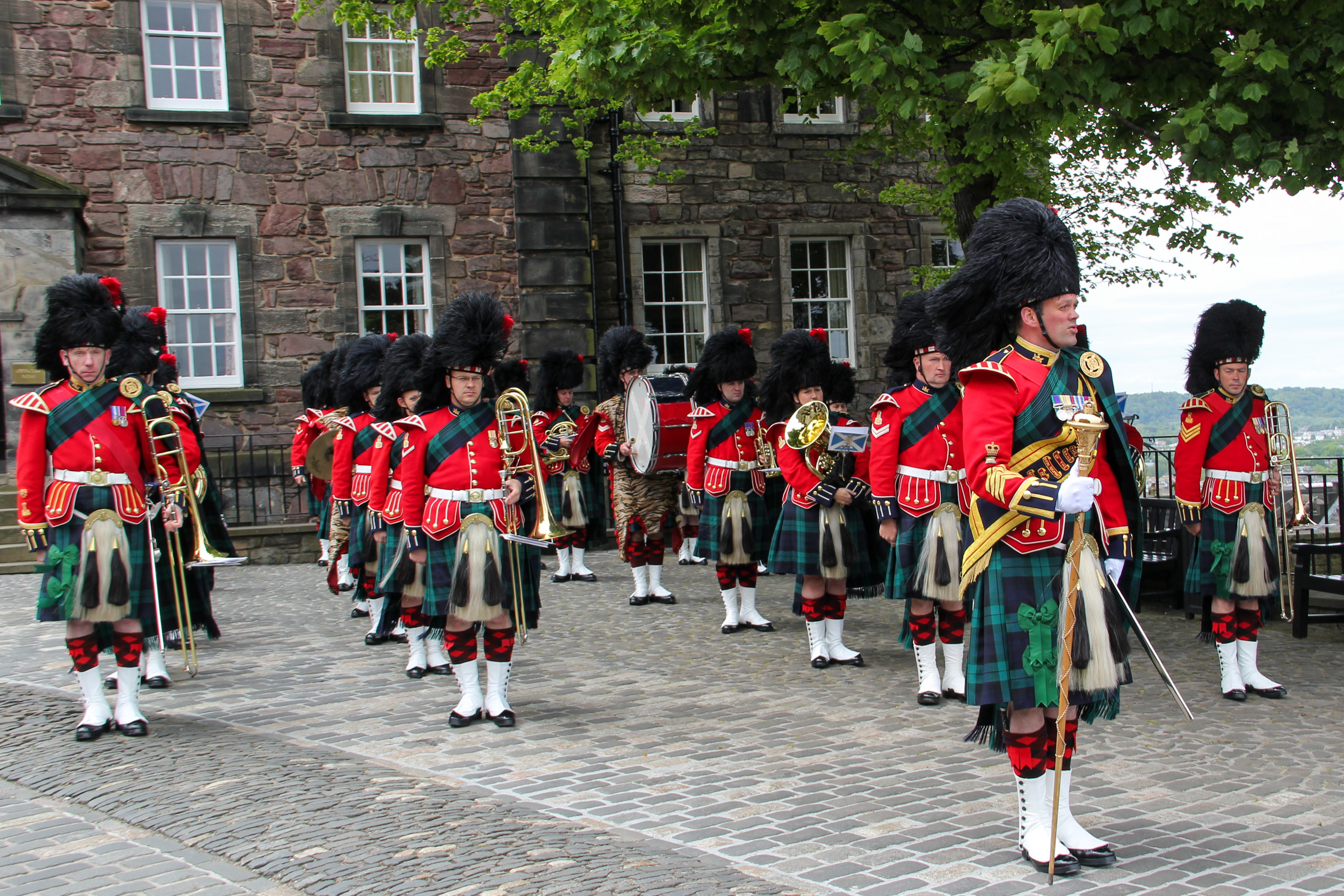
The Band of the Royal Regiment of Scotland

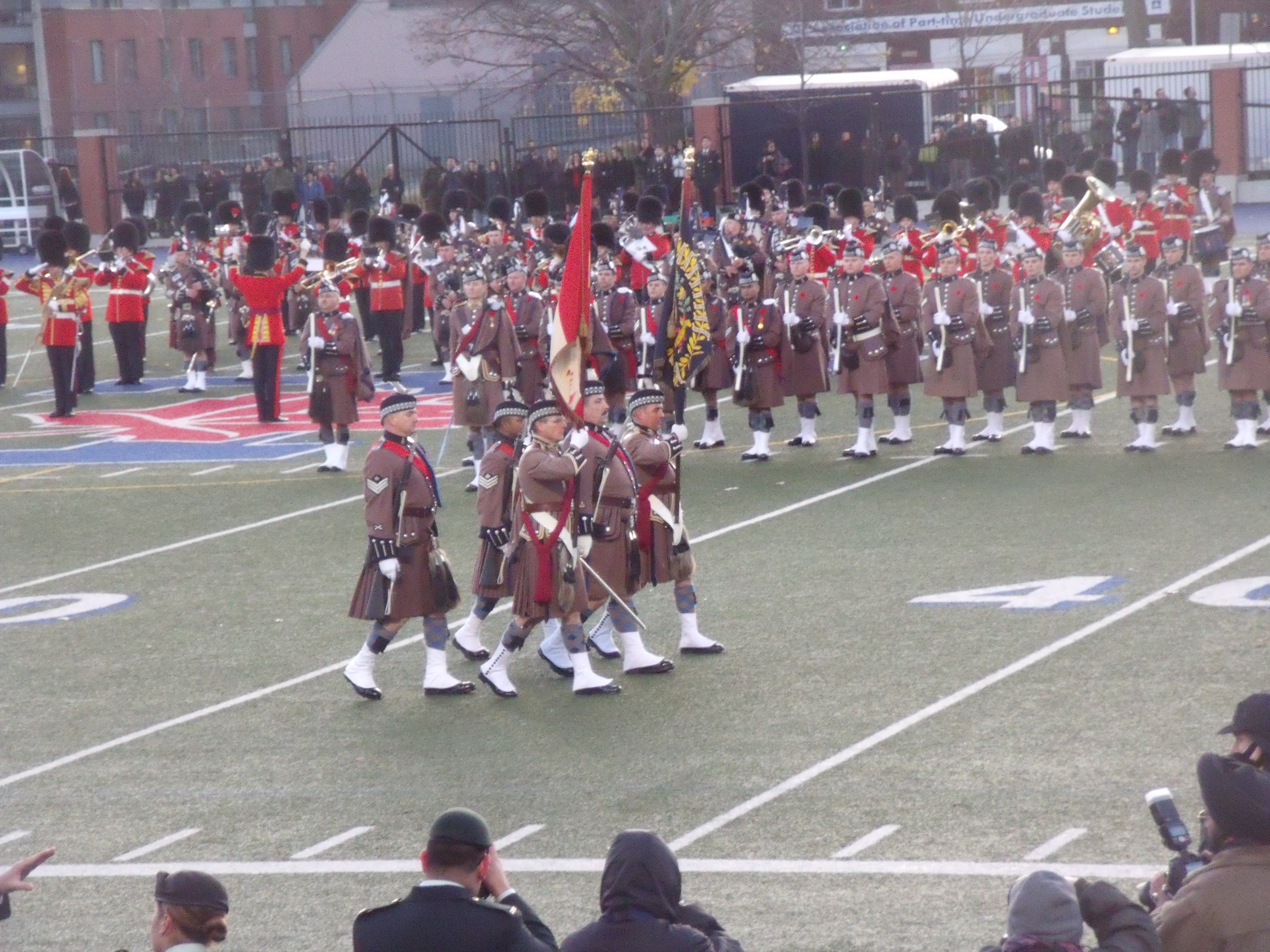
Toronto Scottish Regiment Presentation of Colours March Off
