= Trews =

Traditional Celtic tightly-fit footed trousers

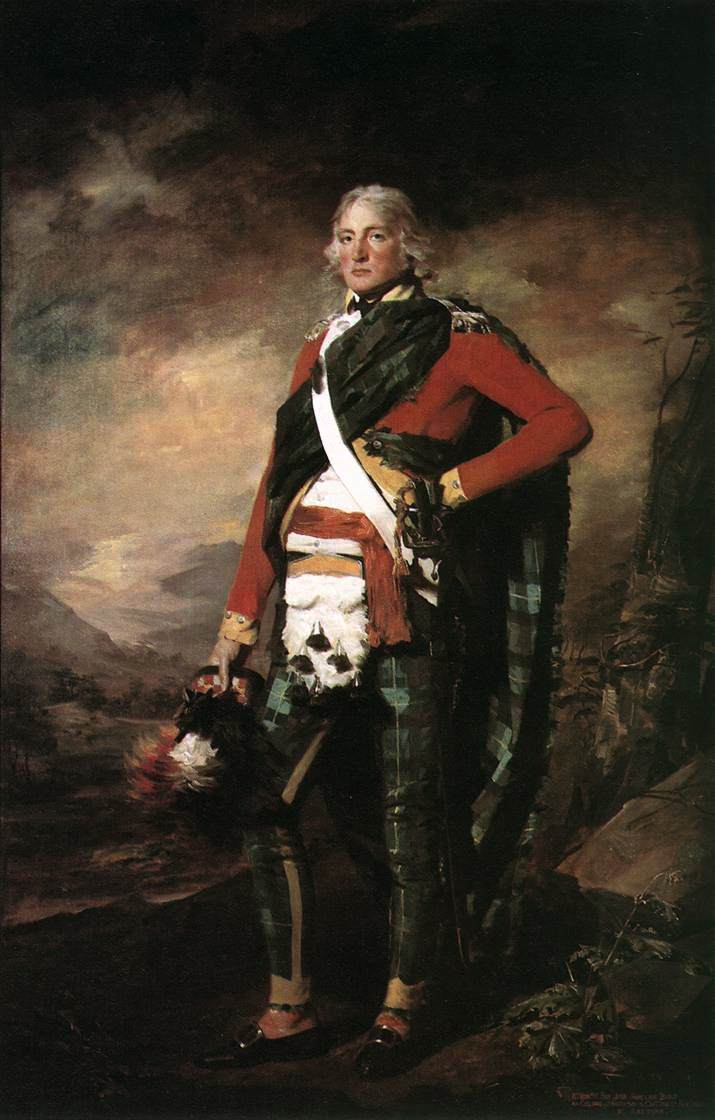
Sir John Sinclair by Henry Raeburn, 1794–95. Sir John wears leather-trimmed trews of fabric cut on the straight grain.

Trews (or truis, Scottish Gaelic: triubhas) are men's clothing for the legs and lower abdomen, a traditional form of tartan trousers from Scottish Highland dress. Trews could be trimmed with leather, usually buckskin, especially on the inner leg to prevent wear from riding on a horse.

Tartan trews shared the fate of other items of Highland dress under the proscription of the Dress Act 1746, which banned men and boys from wearing the truis ("trowse") outside of military service. The Dress Act 1746 lasted until 1782 when it was repealed under the reign of King George III.

== Origins ==
Trews appear to date to at least as early as Roman Britain. The triumphal arch of Volubilis completed in 217 AD once featured a bronze statue of Roman Emperor Caracalla; the only surviving fragment of the statue depicts a Caledonian Pictish prisoner wearing tartan trews. It was carved then inlaid with bronze and silver alloys to give a variegated appearance.

Written records of tartan trews date back to 1538, as a style of woven tartan-cloth trousers, a garment preferably used during the Highland winter when the kilt would be impractical in such cold weather. The word is triubhas in Scottish Gaelic; truis or trews are anglicised spellings.

== Traditional trews ==
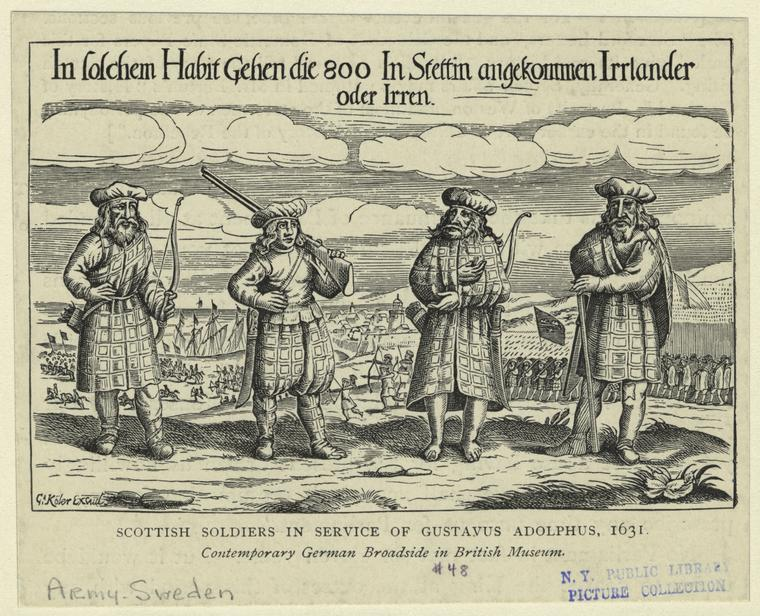
17th century Scottish mercenary (centre) wearing an early example of trews, or possibly tartan hosen and breeches.

Traditional trews were form-fitting garments, similar to the footed hose of the Renaissance, from which they probably evolved. (However, Tacitus says that in 69 BC the Roman general Caecina was considered, by his wearing of the foreign trews when meeting with toga-clad Romans, to show indication of a haughty spirit.) They could be cut as knee-breeches or full length.

These trews were cut on the bias, which allowed the fabric to stretch sufficiently to mould to the body, and placed the tartan "sett" on the diagonal.

Traditional trews are actually long hose rather than trousers. These hose came all the way up to the waist and were attached to a linen cloth. They were fastened at the lower leg, below the knee, by a garter (the precursor to the flashes of the Highland Dress) as can be seen in the painting by David Morier of the Battle of Culloden. It is said in Scottish traditional folklore that these triubhas were actually the common garment of the 16th to 18th centuries in the Highlands. When travelling, in order to avoid getting the trews wet when crossing streams, the Highlander would wear shorter hose, ones that would only reach up to the knee, and wrap his "bed-garments" around his waist, a form of the Great Kilt.

== Modern trews and military trews ==
Modern trews are more like trousers with the fabric cut on the straight grain but without a side seam, and are often high-waisted, usually to be worn with a short jacket, as an alternative to the kilt.

Colonel Sir John Sinclair of Ulbster, proved to his own satisfaction that "the truis" was an older dress than kilts.

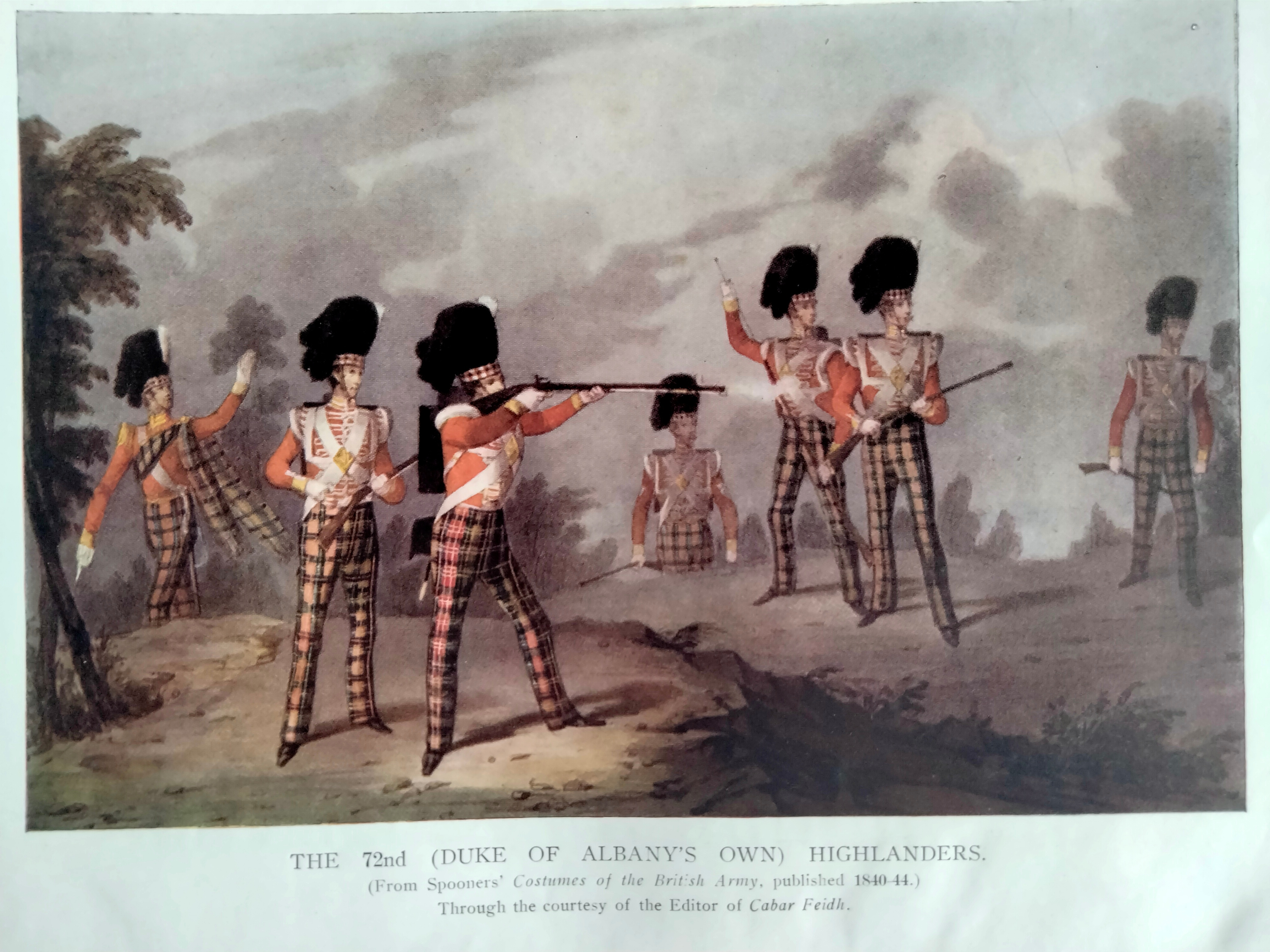
Duke of Albany's Own Highlanders (formerly Seaforth's; 78th, later 72nd Regiment of Foot) during a trews-wearing period, c. 1844

Until the establishment of the Royal Regiment of Scotland in 2006, military trews were usually worn by members of the lowland Scottish regiments as part of their No 1, mess and full dress uniforms. Members of Highland Scottish regiments were usually authorized to wear kilts with these orders of dress. However, all Highland regiments, in more recent times, wore trews with less formal orders of barracks and training dress. They were also part of the uniform of the composite regiment known as The Highlanders (Seaforth, Gordons and Camerons) formed in 1994. The new Royal Regiment of Scotland comprises all the former Scottish infantry line infantry regiments and continues to wear trews in certain limited orders of dress.

Historically trews were part of the Highland cultural tradition, not Lowland. As such, when Lowland regiments became the first of the Scottish regiments to be formed in the mid-1660s to late 1680s, the Lowland soldiers wore standard British military uniform and had no desire to wear tartan items, which they considered to be part of a foreign and savage culture. From these early beginnings up to 1881, the famous Lowland regiments (1st, 21st, 25th, 26th, 70th, 90th, 94th and 99th) wore standard British uniform.

Meanwhile, from 1739 onward, the Highland regiments which were raised insisted on the familiarity of their native dress and great Highland bagpipes, albeit in a modified form to suit a British military identity, as part of their cultural identity. They wore the complex belted plaid and latterly, to encourage recruits unfamiliar with such garb, they adopted the simpler small kilt. However, trews were increasingly worn as off-duty dress and even campaign dress from the late 18th century. Highland regiments stationed in hot or unhealthy surroundings often took to wearing simple white cotton trousers or tartan trews. For example, the 91st Highland Regt of Foot wore trews during the Walcheren campaign of 1809 and more famously, the 93rd Highland Regiment of Foot wore trews and round unfeathered Highland bonnets during the War of 1812 (from 1812 to 1815) against the US, when taking part in the British campaign to capture New Orleans in January 1815 and during the disastrous Battle of Chalmette Plain itself (lithographs of the battle wrongly depict them wearing kilts).

In 1822, following King George IV's successful first visit to Scotland, he ordered the resumption of Highland dress and traditions for one de-kilted regiment. The regiment chosen was the most senior of the de-kilted regiments, the 72nd. They adopted the Highland feather bonnet, the Highland version of the red coatee, but in lieu of kilts, they were ordered to wear trews for all duties. The tartan chosen was a new form of red or royal Stewart called "Prince Charles Edward Stuart", reflecting the new romantic fashion for all things Jacobite.

Due to the military use of trews by the Lowland regiments, the perception of trews as Lowland dress spilled over into civilian wear, so that for many years, trews began to be viewed as Lowland dress, rather than the Highland kilt. However, in recent years, a resurgence in Highland history and traditions has seen trews re-enter the Highland wardrobe, whilst interested Lowlanders have now encompassed these traditions within a wider Scottish template.

== Highland dance ==
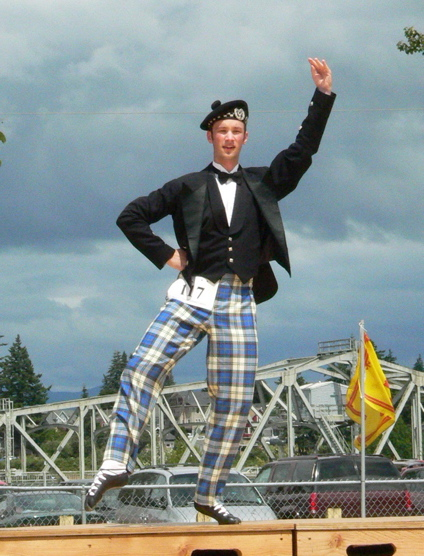
Highland dancer wearing trews

Today, the sideways kicking step of Scottish highland dancers performing the seann triubhas dance is said to symbolise the kicking off of the trews or trousers in favour of the kilt. However, D.G. MacLennan writes in Traditional Highland and Scottish Dances that 'this first step has nothing to do with the idea of kicking off the trews, but...is new to the dance and was composed by myself'. Trews were and can still be worn today for the performance of this dance during the colder months of the year or if preferred.

== Plus-fours and golf attire ==
Tartan plus-fours are traditional golfing attire that are based on the traditional trews. These trousers extend 4 inches below the knee and are often worn with argyle knee-socks. Plus-fours were popularized in the United States by the Prince of Wales during a 1924 visit. The full-length tartan trousers popular with many golfers are also based on trews, but are cut fuller for more freedom of movement and warmer climates.

== See also ==
- Formal trousers
