= Highland dress =

Traditional dress of Scotland's highlands and isles

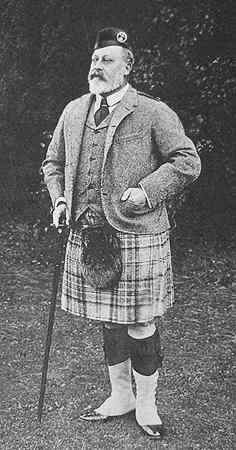
King Edward VII in a tweed Argyll jacket, kilt and Glengarry bonnet (1904)

Highland dress is the traditional, regional dress of the Highlands and Isles of Scotland. It is often characterised by tartan (plaid in North America). Specific designs of shirt, jacket, bodice and headwear may also be worn. On rare occasions with clan badges and other devices indicating family and heritage.

Men's Highland dress typically includes a kilt or trews. Although this may consist of clan tartan, it is more usual for tartans to be chosen for aesthetic reasons. A tartan full plaid, fly plaid, or short belted plaid may also be worn but usually only at very formal events or by the groom at a wedding. There are a number of accessories, which may include but are not limited to: a belt, sporran, sgian-dubh, knee-socks with a cuff known as kilt hose, garters, kilt pins and clan badges.

Women's Highland dress is also based on the clan tartan, either that of her birth clan or, if married, that of her spouse's clan if she so chooses. Traditionally, women and girls do not wear kilts but may wear ankle-length tartan skirts, along with a colour-coordinated blouse and vest. A tartan earasaid, sash or tonnag (smaller shawl) may also be worn, usually pinned with a brooch, sometimes with a clan badge or other family or cultural motif.

== Modern Highland dress ==
In the modern era, Scottish Highland dress can be worn casually, or worn as formal wear to white tie and black tie occasions, especially at ceilidhs and weddings. Just as the black tie dress code has increased in use in England for formal events which historically may have called for white tie, so too is the black tie version of Highland dress increasingly common.

The codification of "proper" Highland dress for formal and semi-formal wear took place during the Victorian era, and these styles have changed little since then (e.g. the Prince Charlie, Sheriffmuir, and regulation jackets have an antique appearance, being based on Victorian military doublets of Highland regiments). In observing "constraints imposed by supposed rules and regulations governing ... what is perceived as permissible in Highland dress", Scottish historian Hugh Cheape writes (2012) that "uniform styles and conformity in dress conventions have emerged since the late nineteenth century and have been encoded in books and tailors' patterns; strict observance is expected and in some circles has become a touchstone of Scottishness. The perpetuation of such views, relatively recently formed, is a self-assumed role of guardians of Scottish 'ethnicity'." He contrasts this mode of regulated Highland dress with the kilt's contemporary "renaissance as a style item ... even a post-modern trend in kilt-wear instigated with the 1970s and 1980s punk styles; we see the kilt worn with chunky socks, boots, white T-shirt and black jacket".

Regardless of formality level, the basis of all modern men's and women's Highland dress starts with the tartan, either as a kilt, trews, arisaid, sash, or tonnag. Tartans in Scotland are registered at the Scottish Register of Tartans in Edinburgh, a non-ministerial department and are usually aligned to a clan or branch of a clan; however, tartans can also be registered exclusively for an individual or institution, and many "district" or "national" patterns also exist that have no associations to particular families or organisations.

Historically, weaponry formed a common accessory of men's Highland dress, such as the mattucashlass and the dirk. However, due to the UK's knife laws, small sgian-dubhs and sword shape kilt pins are more commonly seen today.

For men's and women's shoes, dance ghillies are thin, foldable turnshoes, now used mostly for indoor wear and Scottish dancing. The sole and uppers cut from one piece of leather, wrapped around the foot from the bottom, laced at the top, and seamed at the heel and toe. Ghillie brogues are thick-soled welted-rand shoes. In both, the laces are wrapped around and tied firmly above the wearer's ankles so that the shoes do not get pulled off in the mud. The shoes lack tongues so the wearer's feet can dry more quickly in the typically damp Scottish weather.

=== Formal day wear (morning dress) ===
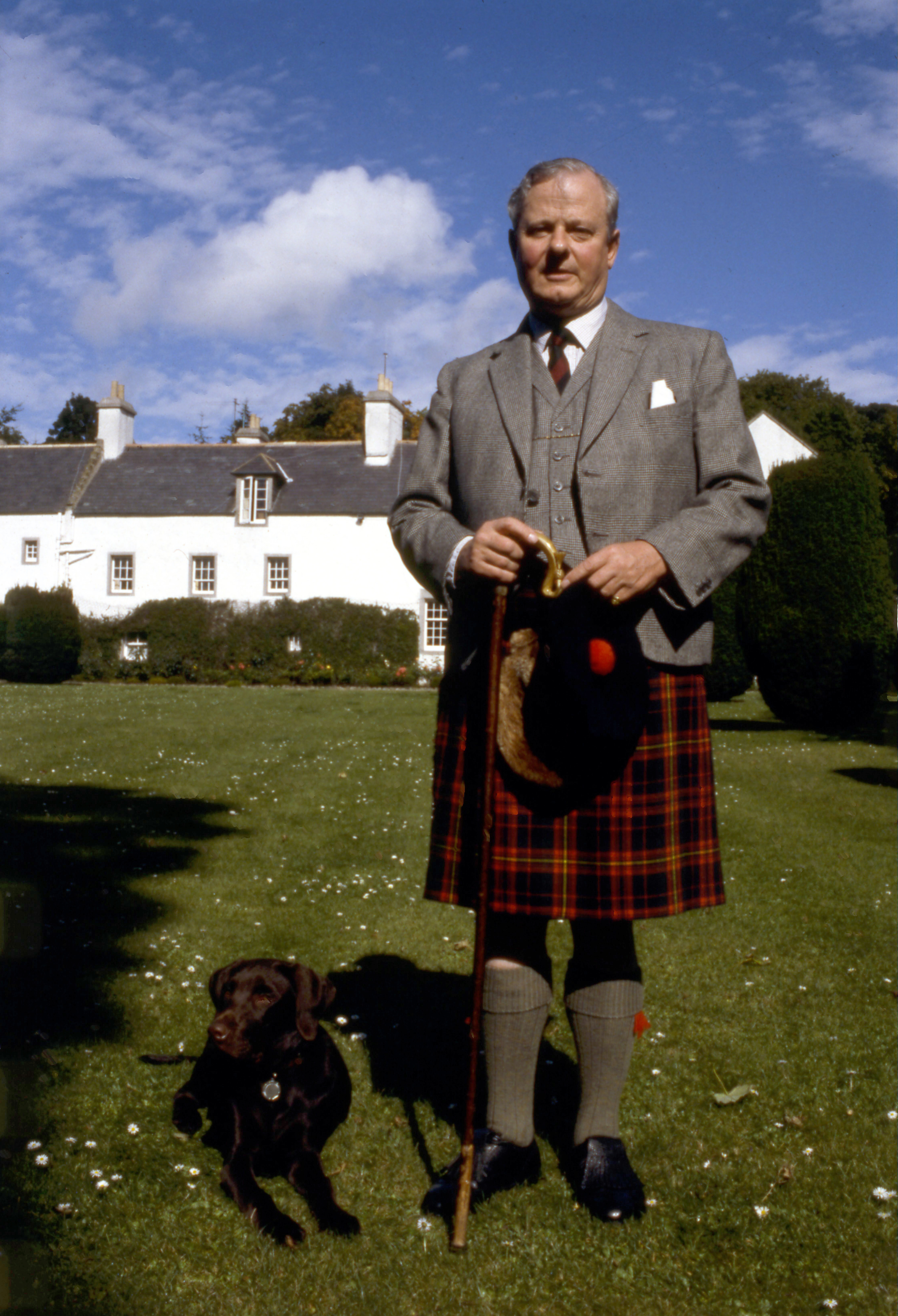
James Carnegie, 3rd Duke of Fife, in a plain-cuff Crail jacket (1984)

Highland dress may also be worn as a folk-costume option at events requiring morning dress. As such, for formal day-wear use it generally consists of:

Men:

- Plain superfine wool or barathea black, charcoal or tweed Argyll-, Crail-, and Braemar-style kilt jacket
- Belt and buckle or five- or six-button waistcoat in matching grey, putty, complementary or tartan material in matching colour
- Kilt
- White shirt with turndown collar, French cuffs, and cufflinks
- Long tie in a single colour or striped regimental style
- Black brogues (according to some views, brown shoes should never be worn with Highland dress, although such are worn by the royals)
- Tartan, argyle, diced, or plain coloured dark hose (white and off-white hose should be avoided)
- Flashes or garter ties
- Day or horse hair sporran
- Morning dress sgian-dubh (less intricate than for the full dress and typically made of horn or antler).

=== Formal evening wear (white tie) ===
The traditional white-tie version of Highland dress consists of:

Men:

- Formal kilt doublet in barathea or velvet. The regulation, Montrose, Sheriffmuir and Kenmore doublets are suitable in a variety of colours. Velvet is considered to be a more formal material. The Prince Charlie jacket (coatee) is considered to be less formal, although when introduced it was to be worn with a white lace jabot. Tartan jackets are also seen.
- Waistcoat in white marcella, tartan (usually to match the kilt), red or the same material as the doublet. No waistcoat is worn with the Kenmore or Montrose doublets.
- Kilt with formal kilt pin
- White stiff-front shirt with wing collar and white, gold, or silver studs and cufflinks for the Regulation doublet, or a white formal shirt and optional lace cuffs for the Montrose, Sheriffmuir, and Kenmore doublets
- White lace jabot. A black silk or a white marcella bow tie may be worn in place of the jabot with the regulation doublet (Highland wear often includes a black bow tie even at white-tie events).
- Black formal shoes or black buckle brogues
- Tartan or diced kilt hose
- Silk garter flashes or garter ties
- Silver-mounted sporran in fur, sealskin or hair with a silver chain belt
- Black, silver-mounted and jeweled sgian-dubh
- Highland bonnet (Balmoral or Glengarry) with crest badge (only worn outdoors)
- Short belted plaid with silver plaid brooch (optional)
- Scottish dirk (optional)

=== Semi-formal day wear (black lounge suit equivalent) ===
The semi-formal version of Highland dress consists of:

Men:

- Black or charcoal semi-formal kilt jacket in superfine wool or barathea – Argyll-, Crail-, and Braemar-style jackets are suitable
- Five- or six-button waistcoat in black, grey, putty or tartan
- Kilt
- White shirt with turndown collar, French cuffs, and cufflinks
- Tie in a single colour
- Black brogues
- Tartan, argyle, diced or dark hose (white and off-white hose should be avoided)
- Flashes or garter ties
- Day-dress sporran with simple designs and often in black leather – however, a full dress sporran is not considered inappropriate
- Day-dress sgian-dubh (less intricate than for the full dress and typically made of horn or antler)

=== Semi-formal evening wear (black tie) ===
Traditionally, black-tie Highland dress comprises:

Men:

- Black, or other solid colour, barathea jacket with silver buttons – Regulation doublet, Prince Charlie (coatee), Brian Boru, Braemar, Argyll, and black mess jackets are suitable (there is some contention about whether the Duke of Montrose and Sheriffmuir doublets are too formal for black-tie occasions)
- Black waistcoat
- Kilt
- White shirt with shirt studs, French or barrel cuffs, and a turndown collar (wing collars are reserved for white tie)
- Black bow tie
- Evening dress brogues
- Tartan or diced full-dress kilt hose – off-white hose are often seen but are deplored by some, such as the late David Lumsden of Cushnie
- Silk flashes or garter ties
- Dress sporran with silver chain
- Black, silver-mounted sgian dubh
- Highland bonnet with crest badge (only suitable outdoors)
- Miniature medals (if authorised)

== Historical descriptions ==
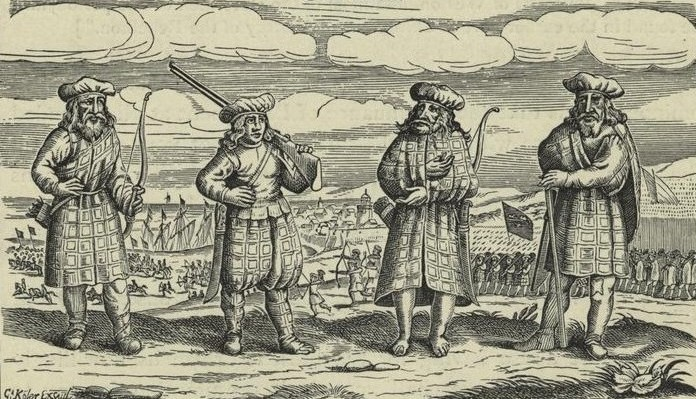
Highlanders wearing kilts, plaids, bonnets, and an early example of trews; 1631 German engraving.

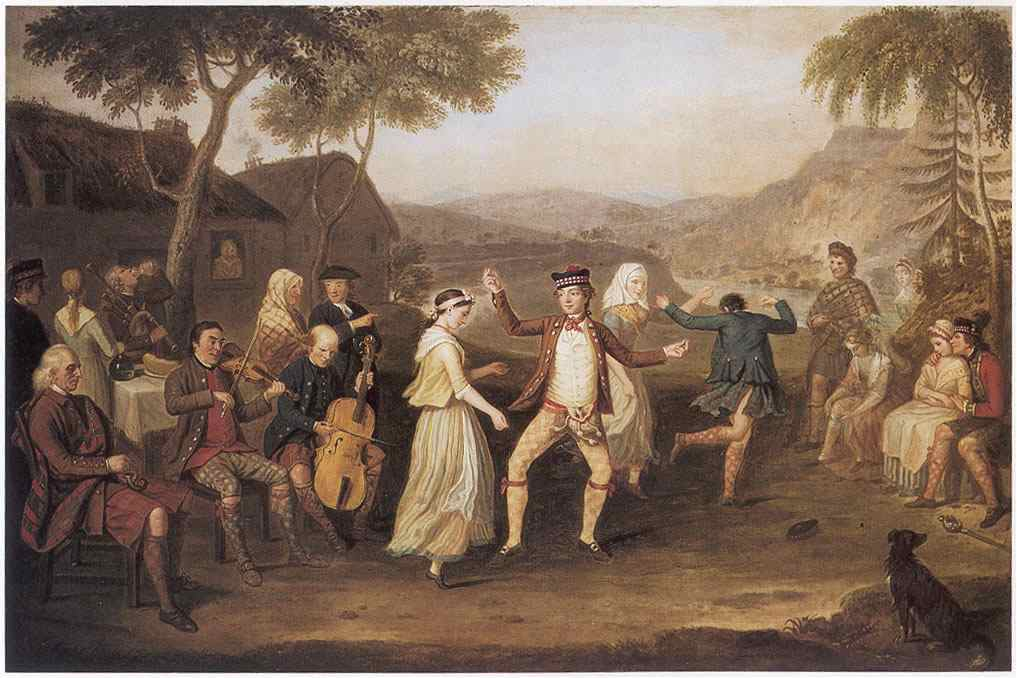
The Highland Wedding, David Allan (1780)

In 1618, a poet from London, John Taylor, described the costume of Scottish aristocrats, lairds, and their followers and servants, dressed for hunting at Braemar. In August and September, all classes dressed in the same fashion by custom, as if equals. This included tartan stockings and jerkins, with garters of twisted straw, and a finer plaid mantle round their shoulders. They had knotted handkerchiefs at their necks and wore blue caps. Taylor said the tartan was "warm stuff of diverse colours."

Near the end of the seventeenth century, Martin Martin gave a description of traditional women's clothing in the Western Islands, the earasaid with its brooches and buckles.

"The ancient dress wore by the women, and which is yet wore by some of the vulgar, called arisad, is a white plaid, having a few small stripes of black, blue and red; it reached from the neck to the heels, and was tied before on the breast with a buckle of silver or brass, according to the quality of the person. I have seen some of the former of an hundred marks value; it was broad as any ordinary pewter plate, the whole curiously engraven with various animals etc. There was a lesser buckle which was wore in the middle of the larger, and above two ounces weight; it had in the centre a large piece of crystal, or some finer stone, and this was set all around with several finer stones of a lesser size. The plaid being pleated all round, was tied with a belt below the breast; the belt was of leather, and several pieces of silver intermixed with the leather like a chain. The lower end of the belt has a piece of plate about eight inches long, and three in breadth, curiously engraven; the end of which was adorned with fine stones, or pieces of red coral. They wore sleeves of scarlet cloth, closed at the end as men's vests, with gold lace round them, having plate buttons with fine stones. The head dress was a fine kerchief of linen strait (tight) about the head, hanging down the back taper-wise; a large lock of hair hangs down their cheeks above their breast, the lower end tied with a knot of ribbands."

According to the English military chaplain Thomas Morer in 1689, Highland men wore plaids about seven or eight yards (6.4 to 7.3 m) long, which covered from the neck to the knees except the right arm. Beneath the plaid they wore a waistcoat or a shirt to the same length as the drape of the plaid. These were "belted plaids." Their stockings were made of the same stuff as the plaid and their shoes were called "brocks" (brogues). Bonnets were blue or "sad" coloured. Morer noted that the fineness of the fabric varied according to the wealth and status of the man.

Scottish Lowlanders and Borderers were dressed much like the English, except both men and women also used a plaid as a cloak. The Lowland women wrapped their plaids over their heads as hoods, whereas Lowland and Border men wore a checkered maud (plaid) wrapped about their upper body. The maud, woven in a pattern known variously as Border tartan, Falkirk tartan, Shepherd's check, Shepherd's plaid and Galashiels grey, became the identifying feature of Border dress as a result of the garment's mention by fashionable Border Scots such as Walter Scott, James Hogg and Henry Scott Riddell and their wearing of it in public. Together with Robert Burns, they can be seen wearing a maud in portraits, etchings and statues.

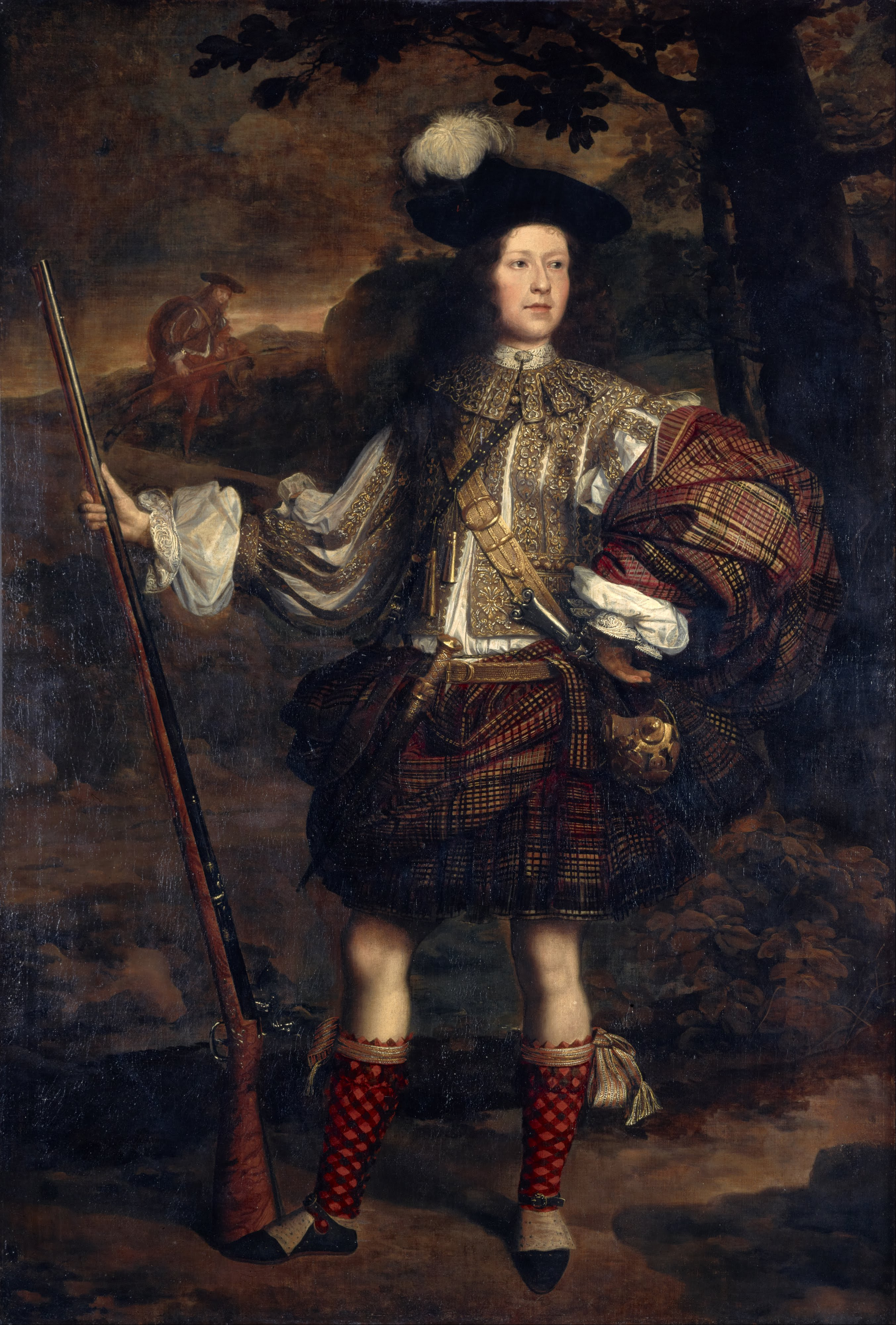
Highland chieftain Lord Mungo Murray wearing belted plaid, around 1680.

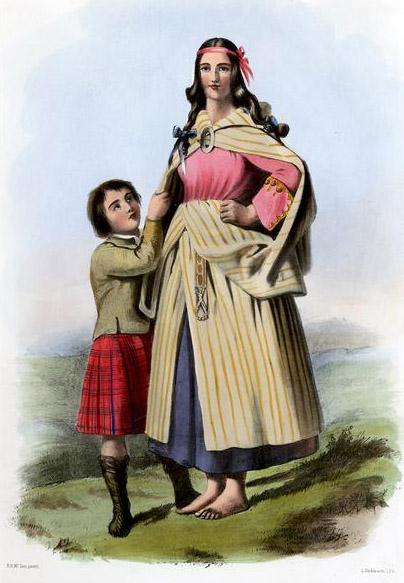
A woman wearing an earasaid, and the typical hairstyle of a married woman, with a child in Matheson tartan (1845) from a description of 150 years before.

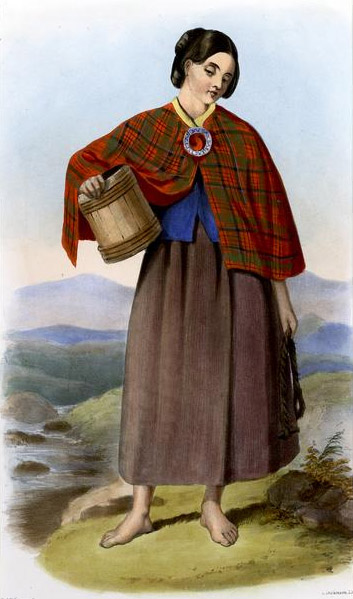
A member of Clan MacNeacail, from The Clans of the Scottish Highlands, wearing a tonnag R. R. McIan (1845)

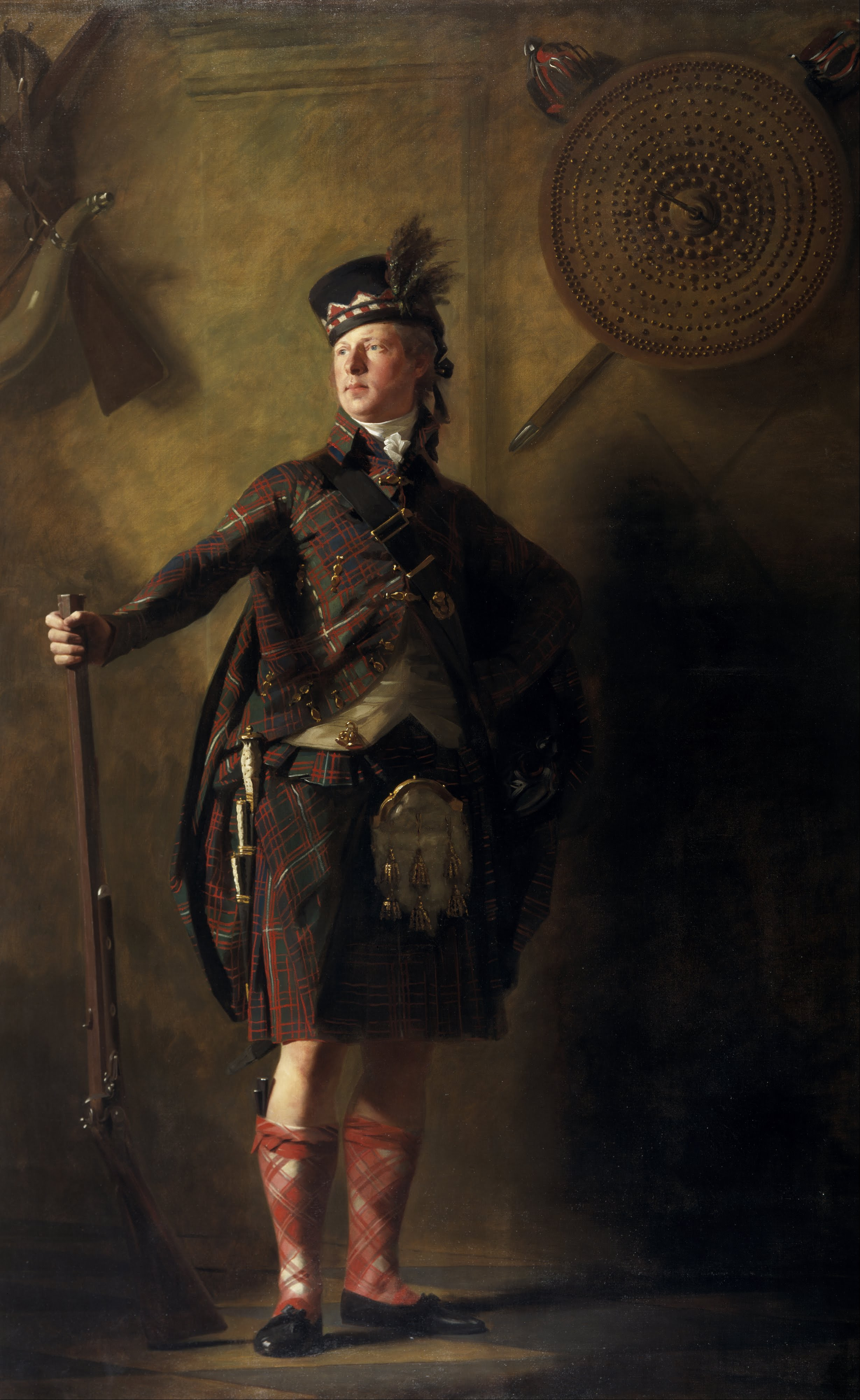
Portrait by Henry Raeburn of Alexander Ranaldson MacDonell of Glengarry in 1812.

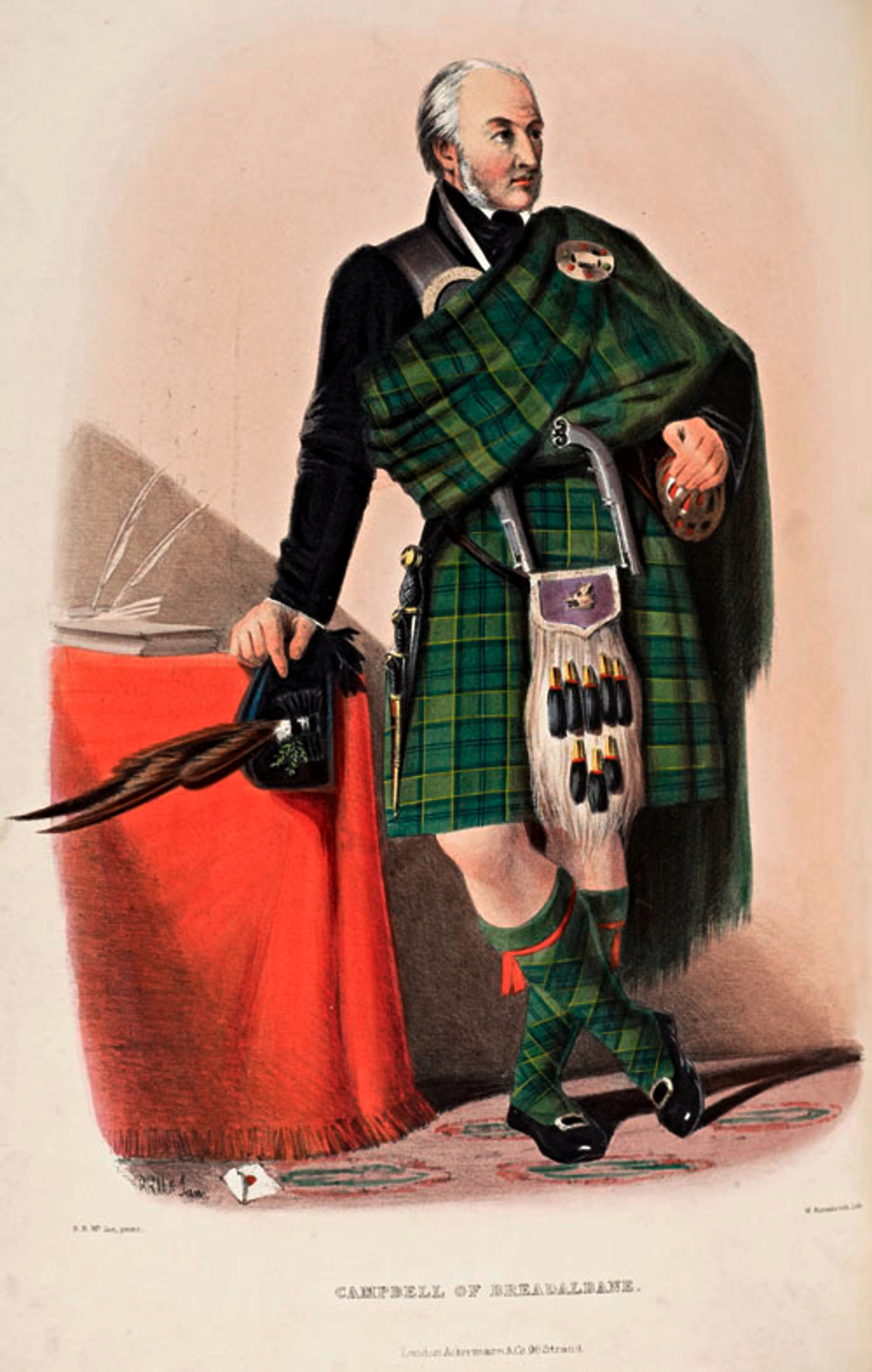
Campbell of Breadalbane (~1845-1847)

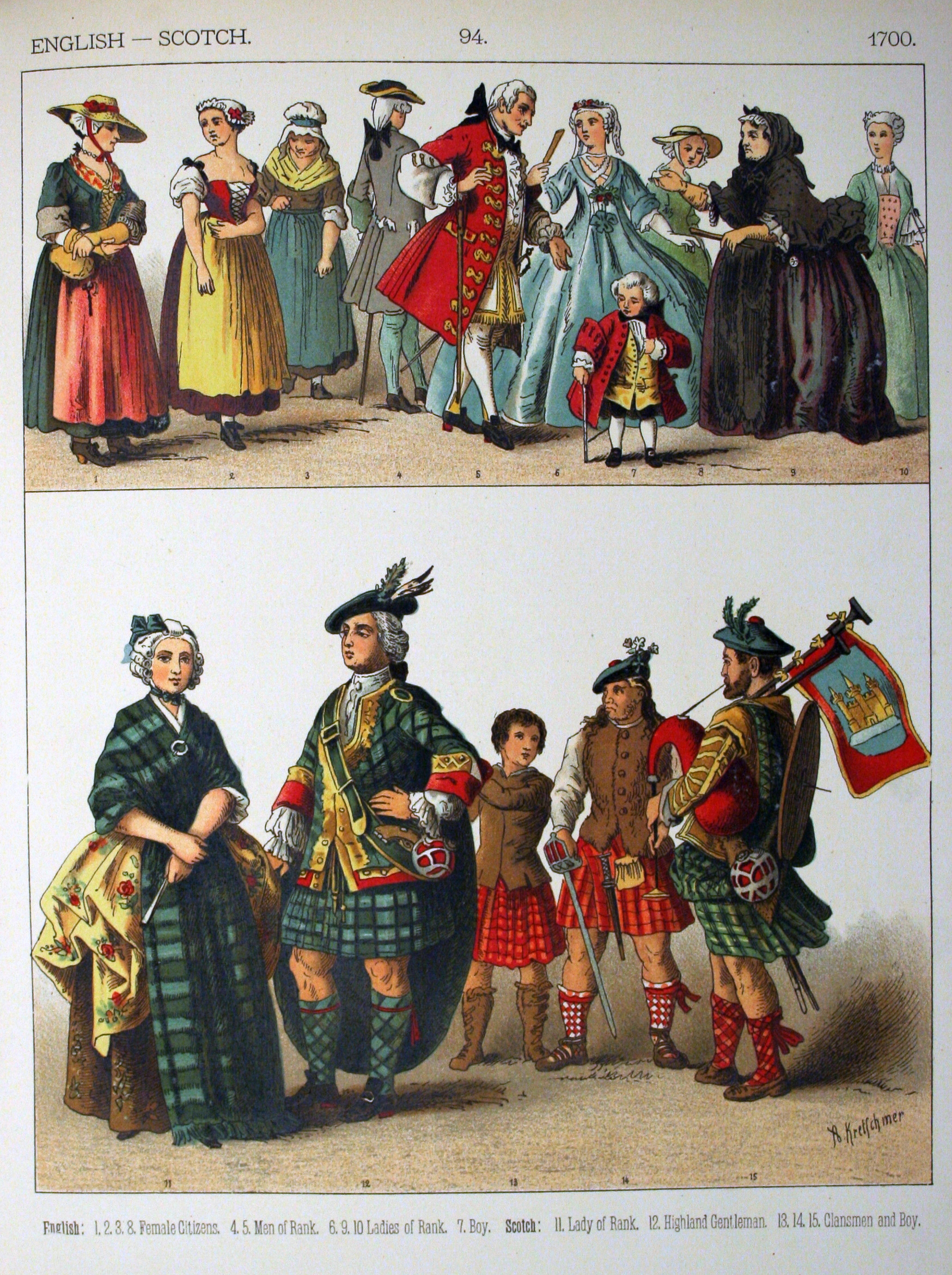
Costumes of All Nations (1882)

== Gallery ==
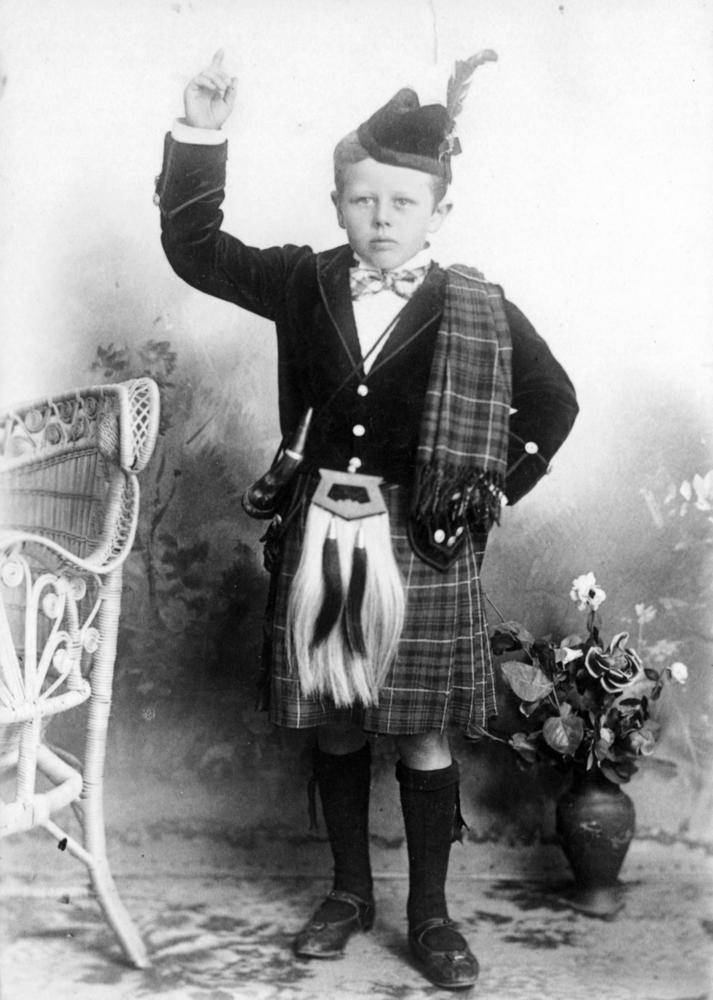
Boy wearing open necked velvet doublet, kilt and plaid (1898)

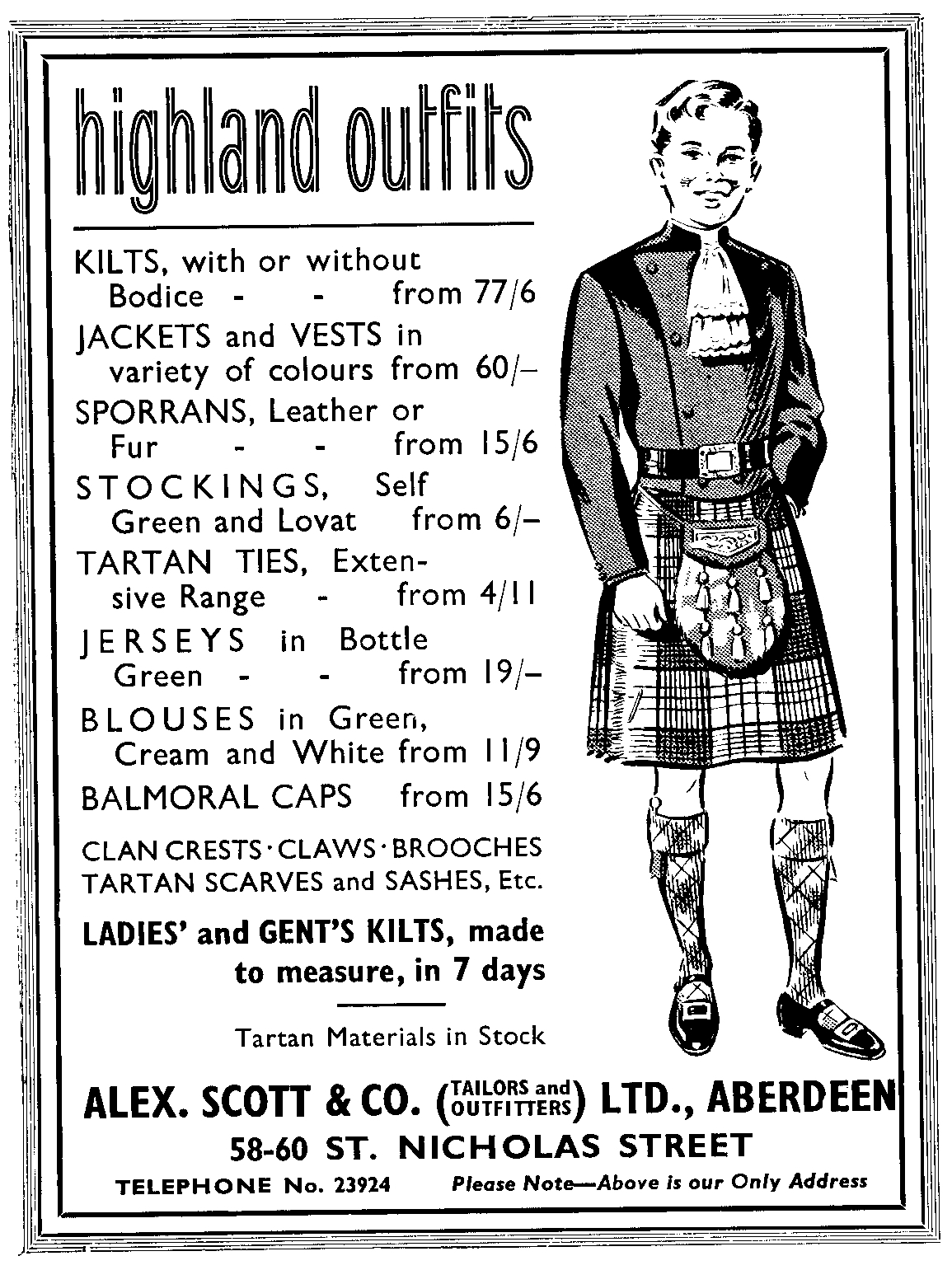
Highland Dress advertisement (1957)

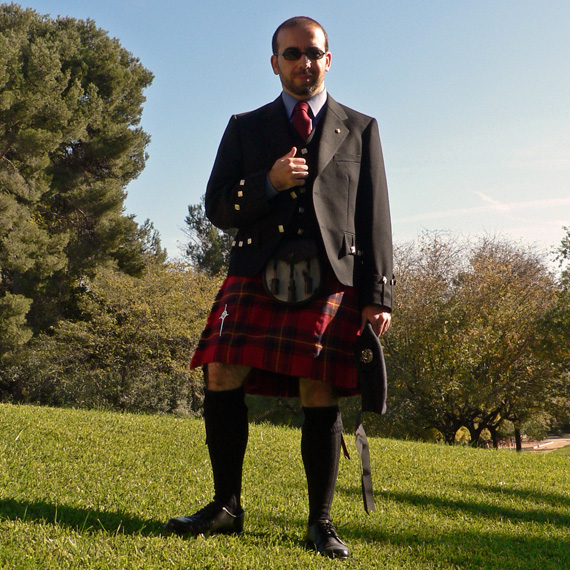
Black Barathea Silver Button Argyll (BBSBA) jacket, worn with a five button waistcoat and long tie for day wear (2006)

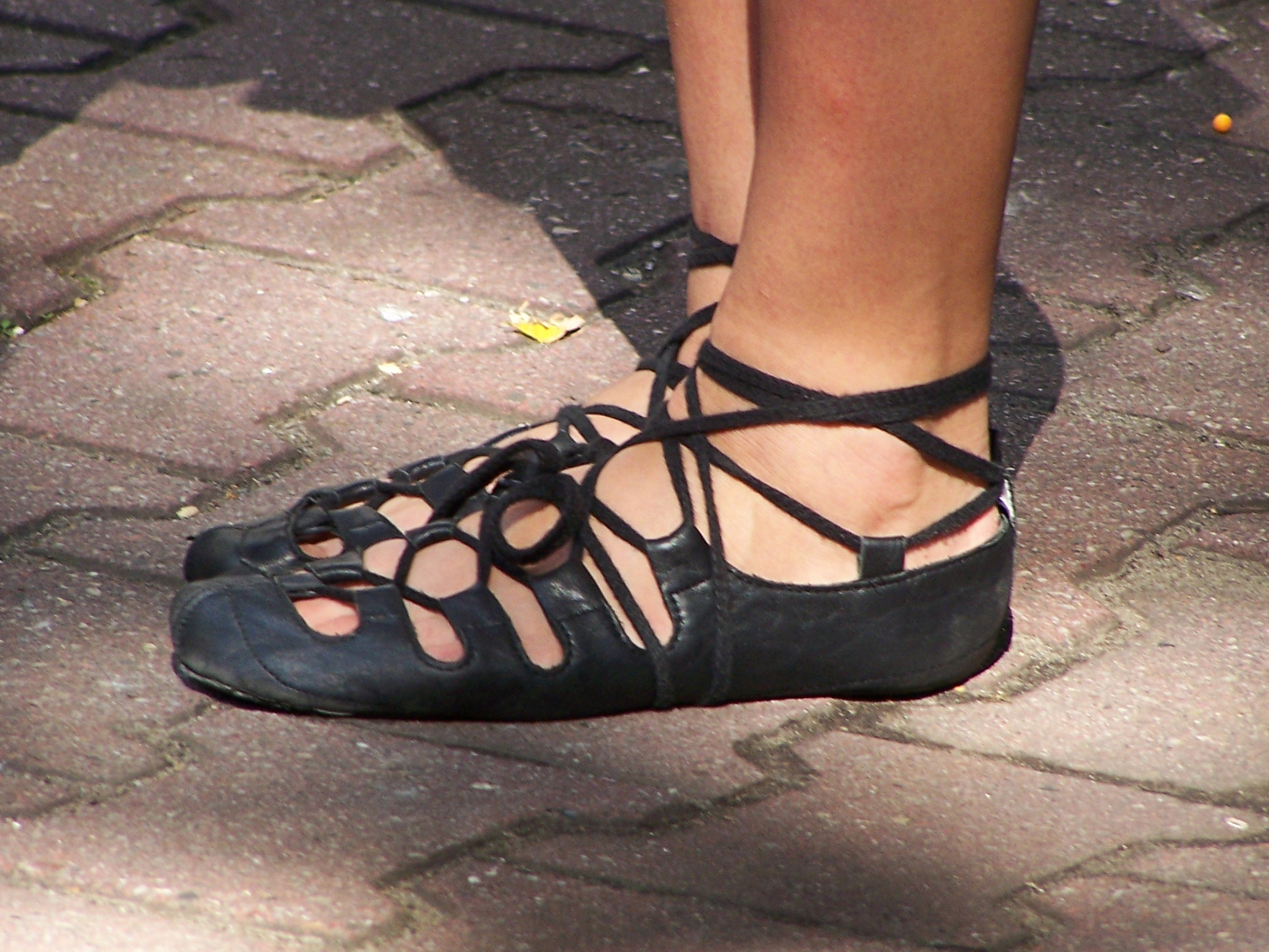
A modern style of ghillies made specifically for dancing (2006)

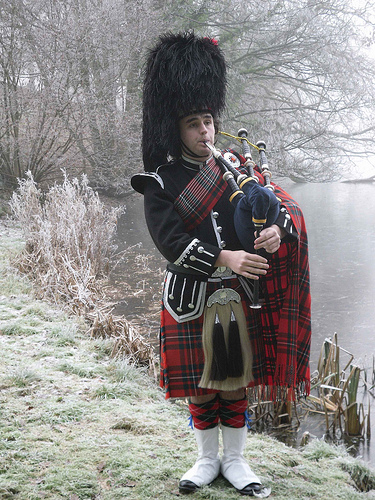
Piper playing the Great Highland Bagpipes in traditional Scottish piper's uniform (2010) (Note: From top to bottom these are called, feather bonnet, doublet, plaid and plaid brooch, belt, sporran, kilt, hose tops, spats, brogues)

== See also ==
- Dress code
