= Argyll jacket =

Jacket worn as part of Scottish Highland dress

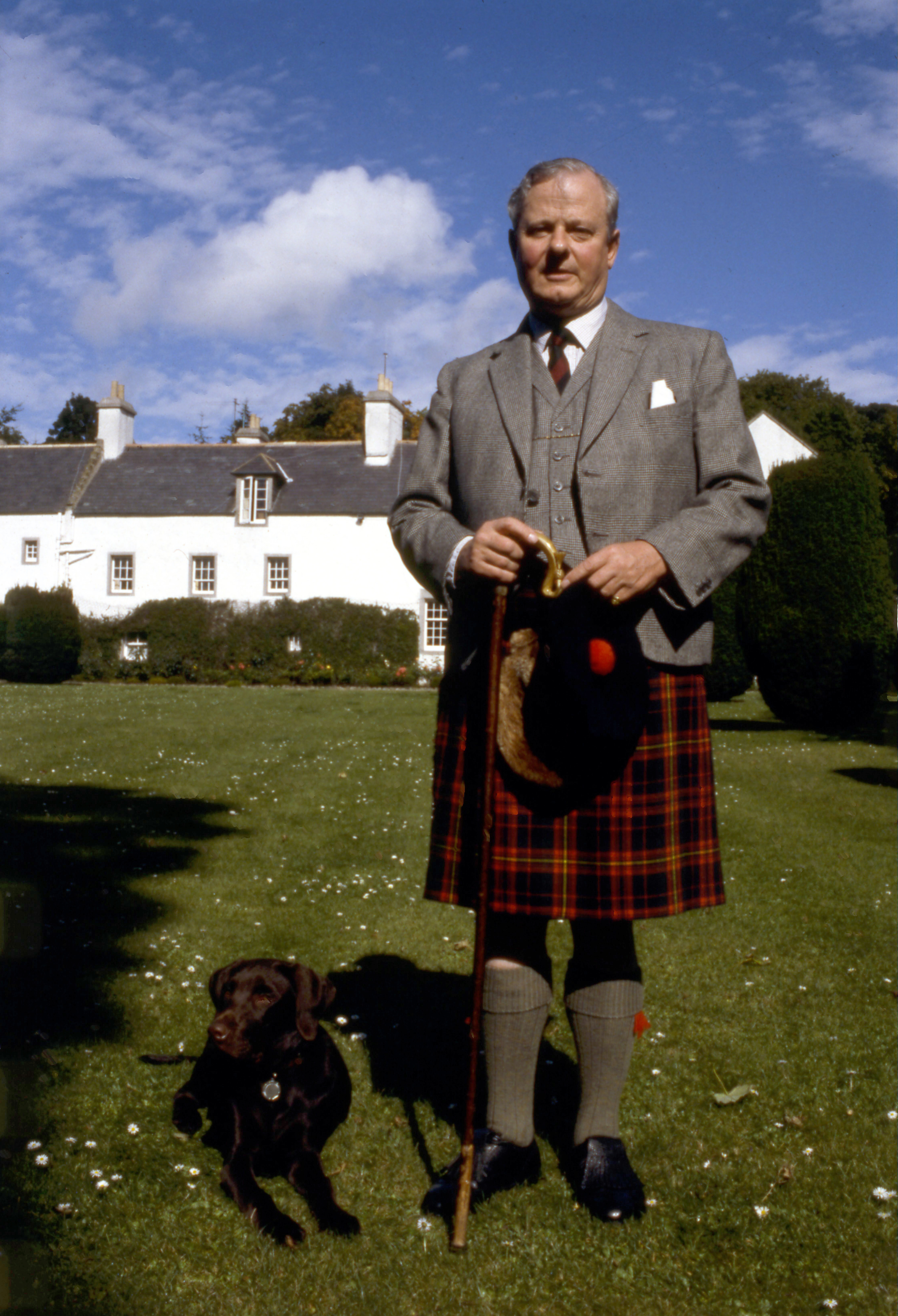
James Carnegie, 3rd Duke of Fife in a plain cuff Crail jacket. (photograph by Allan Warren, 1984)

The Argyll Highland jacket is a shorter than regular jacket with gauntlet cuffs and pocket flaps and front cutaway for wearing with a sporran and kilt. It can be of tweed, tartan or solid colour material. The Argyll is the standard day wear jacket.

Other jackets of the same cutaway for the sporran and kilt are known by other names, such as Crail and Braemar but they are generally often just referred to as an Argyll jacket.

== Gallery ==
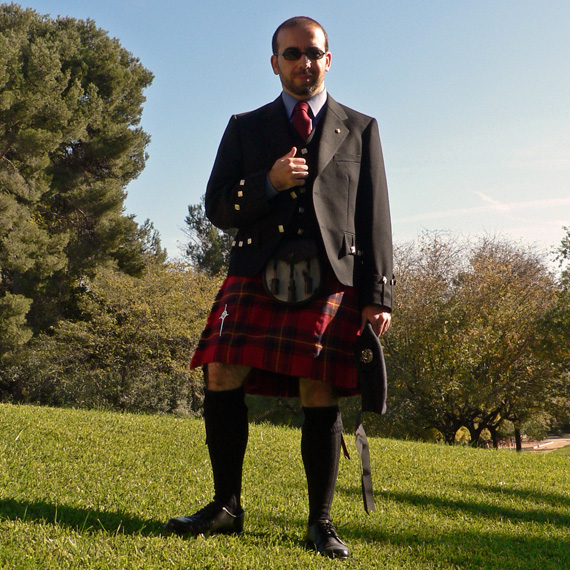
Black Barathea Silver Button Argyll (BBSBA) jacket, worn with a five button waistcoat and long tie for day wear. Suitable for evening wear with a three button vest and bow tie.
