= Prince Charlie jacket =

Formal jacket in Scottish Highland dress

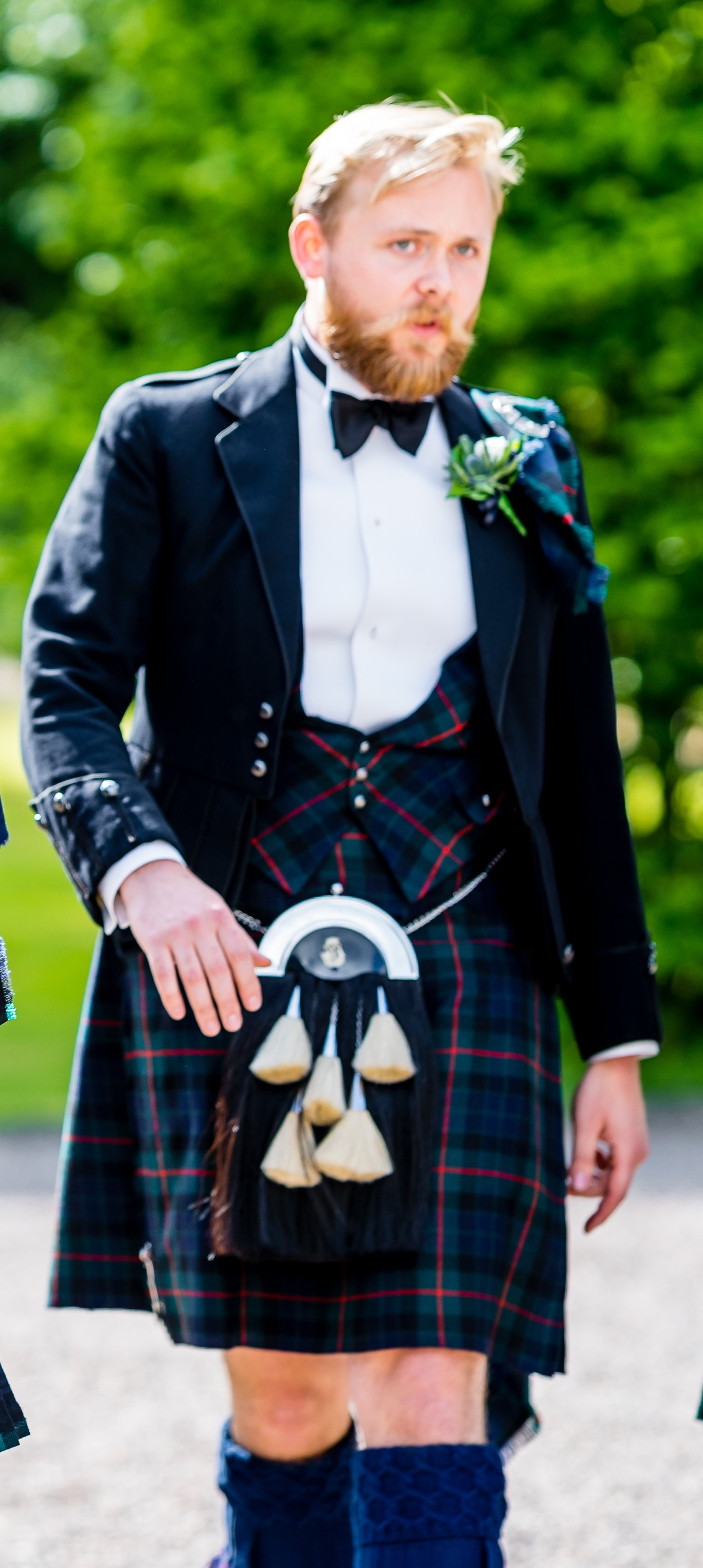
Formal black tie Highland regalia, kilt and Prince Charlie jacket

The Prince Charlie jacket is a formal black-tie jacket for Highland dress that was initially listed in tailor catalogs of the early 1920s as a coatee. Over the next couple of decades it became called a Prince Charlie (PC). When introduced, it was marketed as an alternative to the regulation doublet and was to be worn with a black or white bow tie, else white lace jabot, as well as a tartan or red waistcoat (vest). Today the waistcoat is usually made of the same material as the coat. It is a formal evening jacket and not suitable to be worn for day dress with a long tie.

It is a short-cut jacket with short tails in the back. Embellished with scallop cuffs and silver sleeve buttons, as well as silver buttons in the double-breast style on the front, the back tails also have scallop flaps and silver buttons.

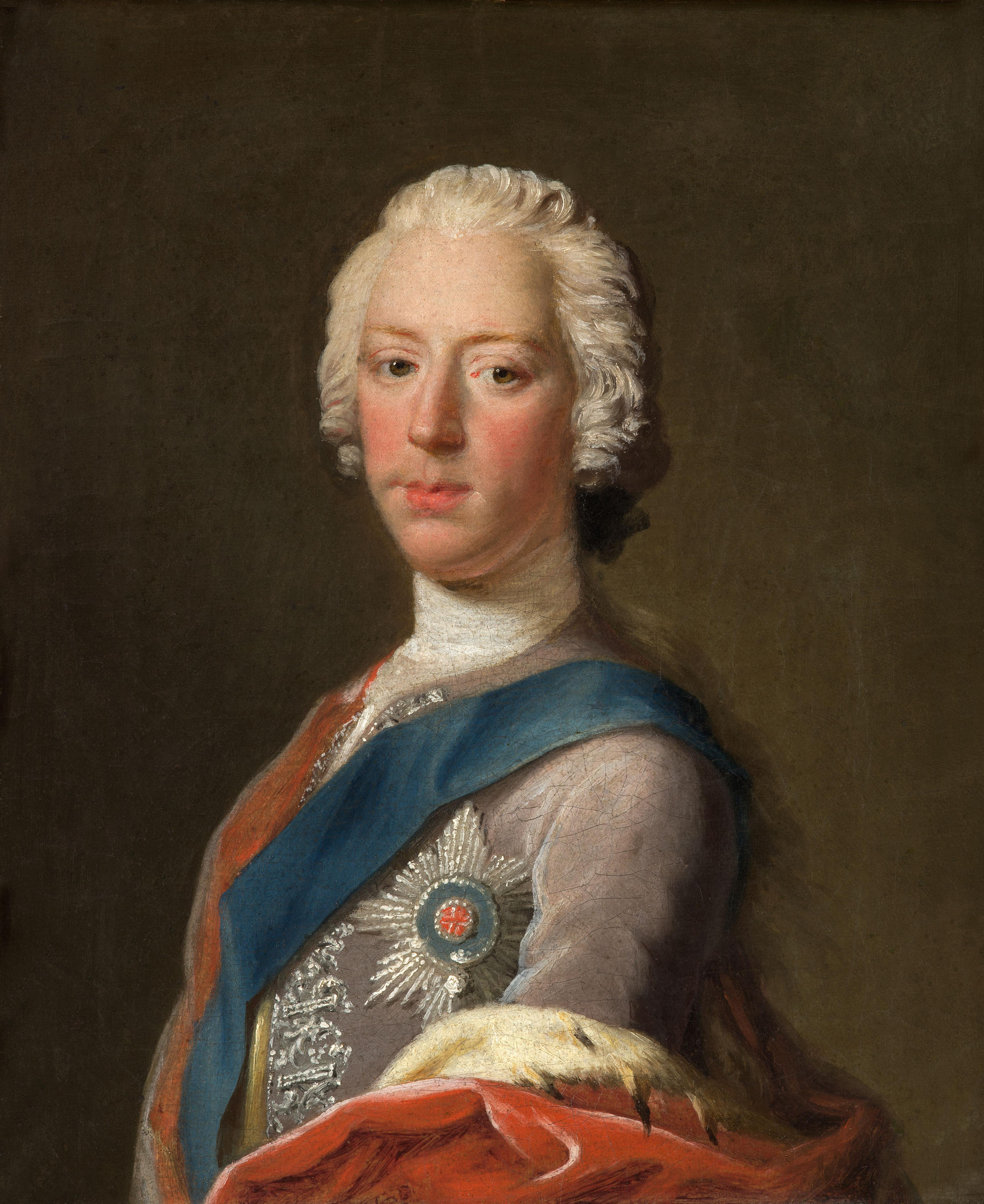
Prince Charles Stewart, namesake of the Prince Charlie jacket.

The jacket is named for Prince Charles Edward Stuart. There is a common belief the Prince Charlie was inspired by a tartan coat worn by its name sake, though there is little evidence to support this. Tailors in the early 20th century used the name Prince Charlie as a marketing tactic.

== Gallery ==
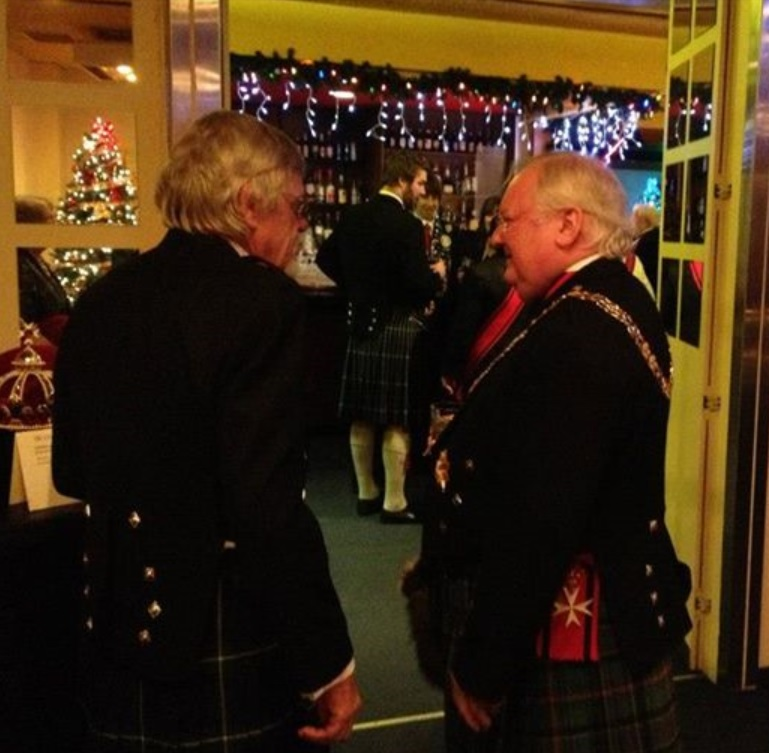
View of black Prince Charlie jackets from the back showing silver buttons

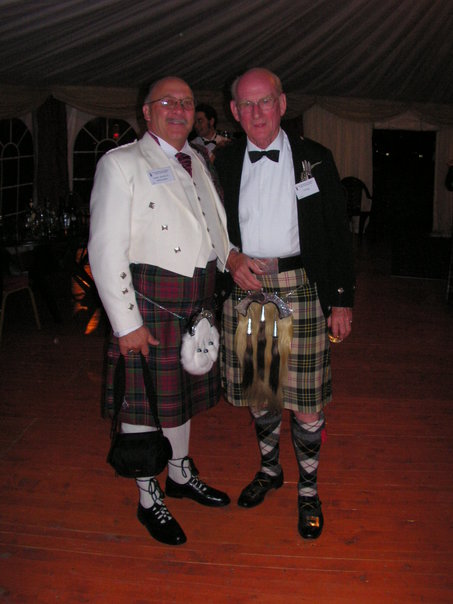
Clan Chief Sir William Macpherson (right) with clan relative Commander Xerxes Z. in white Prince Charlie jacket (left)
