= Full plaid =

Scottish Highland dress

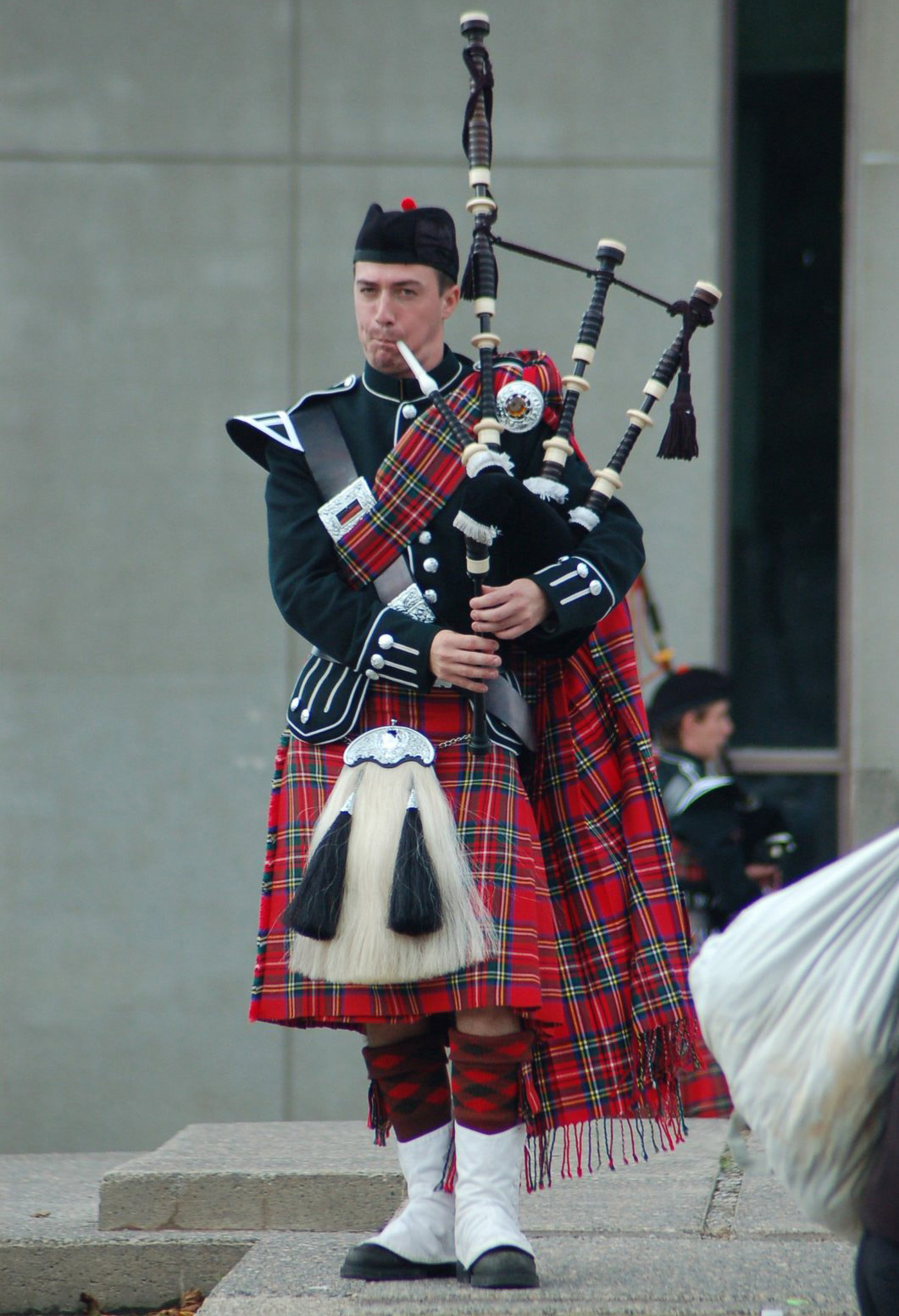
A bagpiper and member of the Queen's Bands wearing a full plaid in traditional Highland dress.

A full plaid, or just a plaid (/plæd/), is a long piece of tartan fabric, most often worn as part of a Highland dress. It usually matches the tartan of the kilt. A modern full plaid is pleated the whole way, with half of its length sewn shut (so that the pleats cannot open). Its length is about twice the distance from the ground to the wearer's shoulder.

A full plaid is typically only seen on members of pipe bands which elect to wear full dress (military styled) uniforms, and occasionally as formal Highland dress.

The full plaid is wrapped around the wearer's chest and under right arm, pulled firm to the body. The plaid is twisted on the left shoulder with one loose end falling behind the wearer's back and getting tucked into the waist belt. The leading edge of the other loose end is pulled forward and draped over the wearer's left shoulder.

Properly worn, the edge of the plaid should be level with top of left spat point at the rear of the leg, with fringe, composed of several inches of warp threads of tartan fabric, hanging down below this level. The lower edge of the plaid should be horizontal and parallel with the ground. The leading edge and front face of the plaid is secured by a brooch (often a cairngorm brooch) on the left shoulder.

To the lay person it would appear as a long, tartan, shoulder-cape.

== Scottish military dress ==
The plaid first appeared as a feature of Highland military dress in the British Army with the establishment of six independent companies raised in 1725. These subsequently became the Black Watch, and the plaid continued as a conspicuous feature of the uniforms worn by Scottish infantry regiments. As a military garment, the plaid served the practical dual purposes of a blanket and overcoat during the 18th century. It also provided protection from rain for the soldier's musket and powder. In its original form, the plaid comprised about twelve yards of double-width regimental or traditional tartan, which had to be laid on the ground and rolled into. The plaid continued to be a feature of regimental full dress uniform throughout the 19th and early 20th centuries, although by 1914 normally worn only by officers, sergeants and pipers.

== See also ==
- Fly plaid, a smaller tartan-cloth mantle, worn pinned to the left shoulder
- Belted plaid or "great kilt", an earlier form of the kilt, it was a large plaid (blanket) pleated by hand and belted around the waist
- Maud (plaid), a cloth mantle made in a small black-and-white chequered pattern
