= Belted plaid =

Large piece of fabric wrapped around the body, loosely gathered and belted at the waist

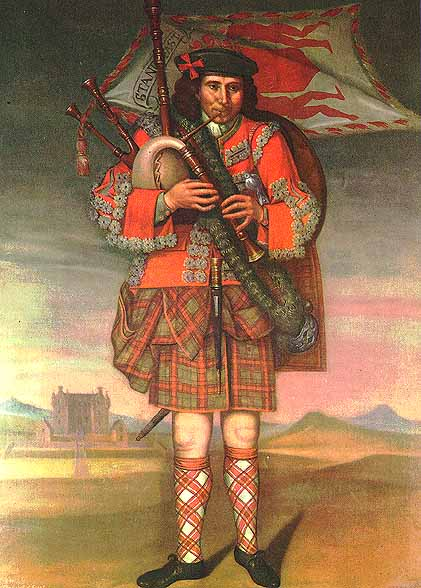
The Grant Piper by Richard Waitt, 1714. The pattern of the piper's belted plaid differs from any modern Grant tartan.

The belted plaid is a large blanket-like piece of fabric which is wrapped around the body with the material pleated or, more accurately, loosely gathered and secured at the waist by means of a belt. Typically, a portion of the belted plaid hangs down to about the knees (for men) or ankles (for women) with the rest of the material being wrapped up around the upper body in a variety of ways and pinned or otherwise secured to keep it in place.

The belted plaid was a standard item of men's Highland dress from the late 16th century until the middle of the 18th century. It was also the precursor of the modern tailored kilt.

== Terminology ==
Pronunciations
Scots Gaelic	Pronunciation
fèileadh-mòr	[feːləɣˈmoːɾ]
breacan an fhèilidh	[ˈpɾʲɛxkan ə ˈɲeːlɪ]

The word plaide in Gaelic roughly means blanket, and that was the original term for the garment. The belted plaid has been and is often referred to by a variety of different terms, including fèileadh-mòr, breacan an fhèilidh; and great kilt; (Note: 'Great kilt' is an English translation of féileadh-mór. The term can be misleading, since this garment was untailored, and modern-era kilts are tailored.) however, the garment was not known by the name great kilt during the years when it was in common use.

Both the terms fèileadh-mòr and breacan an fhèilidh are Gaelic terms, the former meaning roughly 'large wrap' and the latter roughly meaning 'tartan wrap'. Women's ankle-length rough equivalent of the belted plaid is called the earasaid (plural earasaidean; often anglicised to arisaid and arisaids).

== Description and history ==
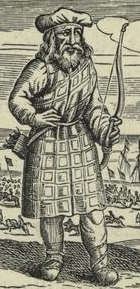
Scottish archer wearing kilt and plaid, early 17th century Pomerania

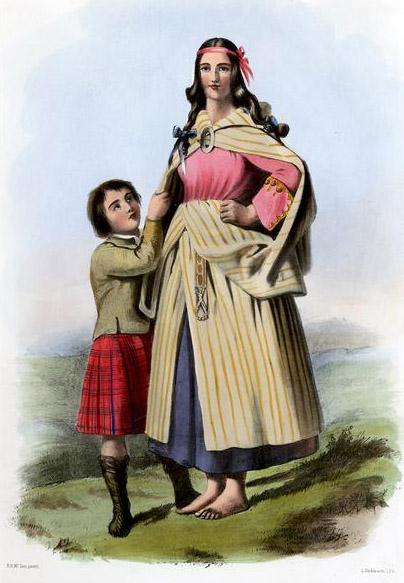
A woman wearing an earasaid, or women's belted plaid; earasaidean were typically striped in dun colours. Published 1845.

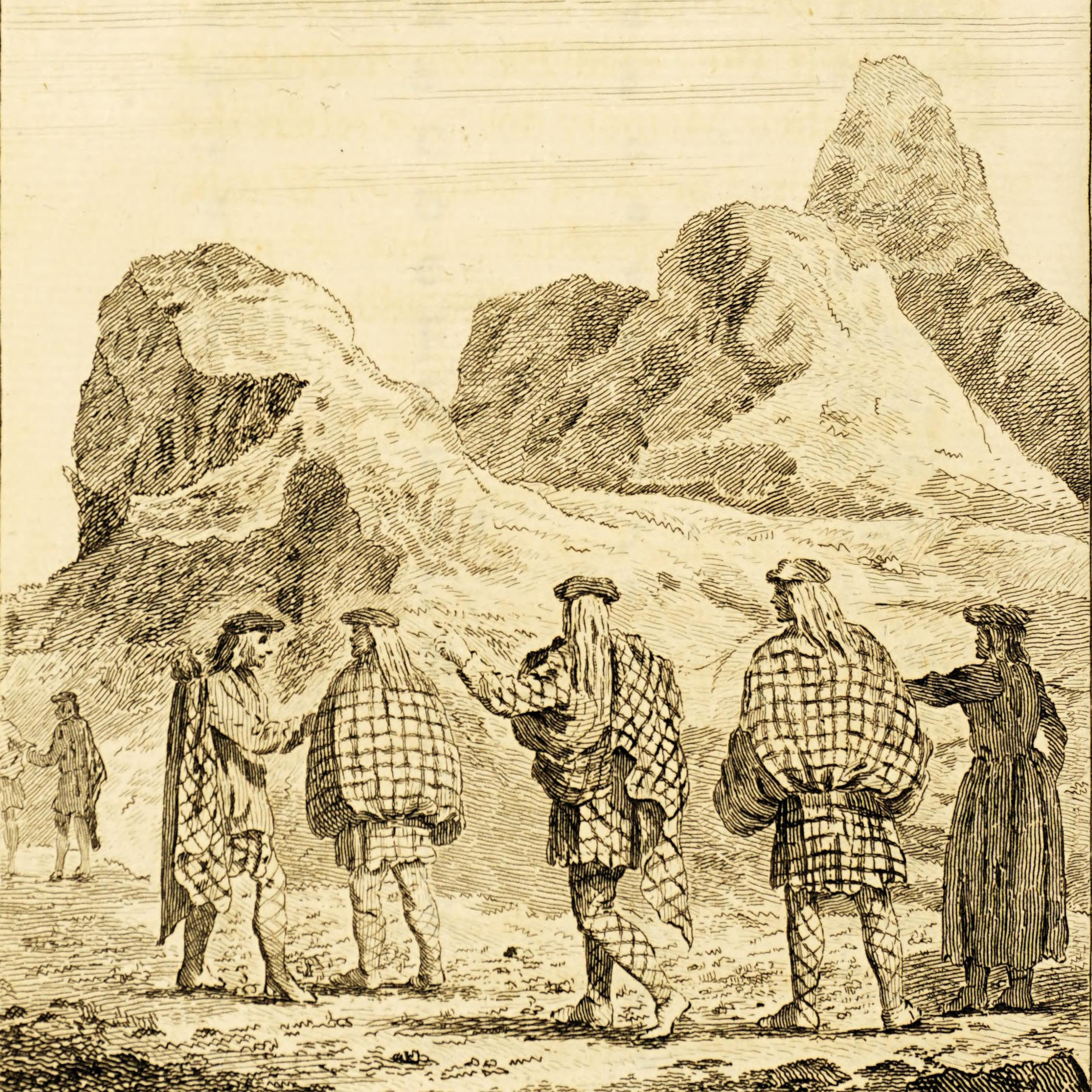
Belted plaids in the Scottish Highlands, 1730s

The belted plaid consisted of a piece of tartan fabric approximately 4 to 5 yards (3.5 to 4.5 metres) in length and about 50 to 60 inches (130 to 150 centimetres) wide. Since the weaving looms in those years wove fabric in 25–30-inch (65–75 cm) widths, the actual item was generally constructed from 8 to 10 yd (7.5 to 9 m) of such single-width fabric by stitching two 25–30-inch (65–75 cm) pieces together to get the 50–60-inch (130–150 cm) width.

It was typically worn as a kind of mantle or cloak cast about the shoulders. In the latter part of the 16th century, some in the Highlands of Scotland began putting a belt around their waist on the outside of the plaid, after first pleating or gathering the fabric.

=== Documentary evidence ===
The first clear reference to the belted plaid occurs in the year 1594. In that year, a group of Highlanders from the Western Isles went to Ireland to fight under Red Hugh O'Donnell. Writing about them, Lughaidh noted that despite being dressed similarly they could be distinguished from the Irish soldiers:

"They were recognized among the Irish soldiers by the distinction of their arms and clothing ... for their exterior dress was mottled cloaks of many colours ..., their belts were over their loins outside their cloaks."

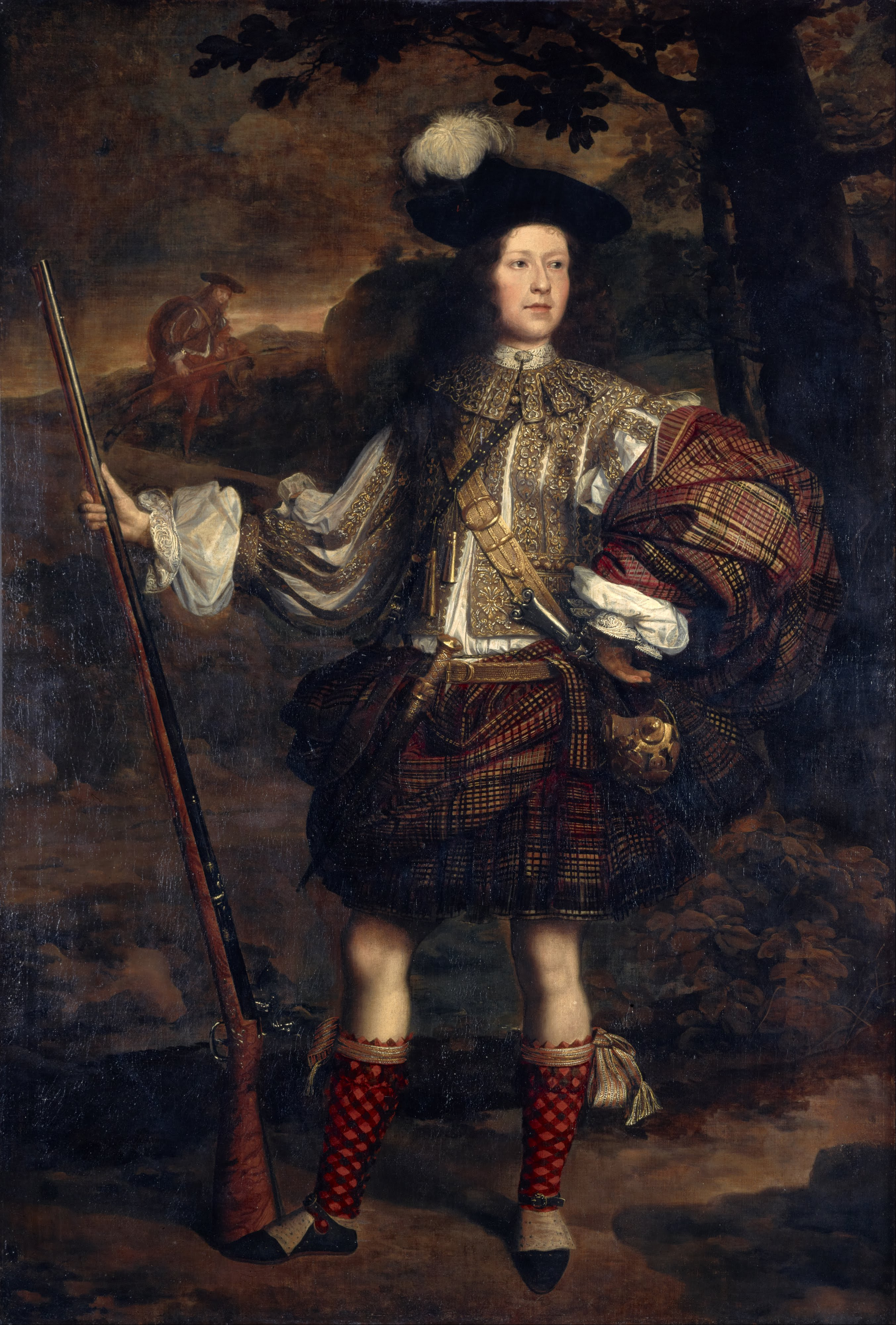
A drawstring under the plaid and a belt over it may both be visible in this late 1600s portrait of Lord Mungo Murray.

A surviving woman's plaid dated 1726 exists (reconstruction, displayed worn as an earasaid).

A surviving men's belted plaid from 1822 has a horizontal seam and small belt loops sewn across it at each pattern repeat, such that it could be rapidly pleated with a drawstring, or flattened entirely into a blanket.

=== Cloth ===
The belted plaid was made from wool, or a wool and linen combination, and twill-woven, often in a pattern of coloured stripes in one or both directions, giving a pattern of stripes or checks, respectively. The latter has become known as tartan, though originally the word referred to the type of cloth used, not the pattern of colours, as it almost exclusively signifies today. Early tartans were only particular to locales, rather than any specific Scottish clan; like other materials, tartan designs were produced by local weavers for local tastes, using the most available natural dyes. The modern notion of "clan tartans", whereby each clan or surname is associated with a particular design, did not exist at that time, but instead dates back to the early 19th century.

=== Customary use ===
The belted plaid was used not only as a garment, but also as bedding at night, the wearer wrapping himself in it and sleeping directly on the ground.

During the years preceding the Battle of Culloden, to the extent that Highlanders wore any kind of kilt-like garment, it was the belted plaid and not the modern tailored kilt.

== See also ==
- Full plaid, a long, pleated, tartan-cloth mantle, wrapped around the upper body and then thrown over the shoulder
- Fly plaid, a smaller tartan-cloth mantle, worn pinned to the left shoulder
- History of the kilt
- Poncho, a garment that could also serve as a blanket.
- Matchcoat
- Maud (plaid), a cloth mantle made in a small black-and-white chequered pattern
