= Barathea =

Type of woven fabric

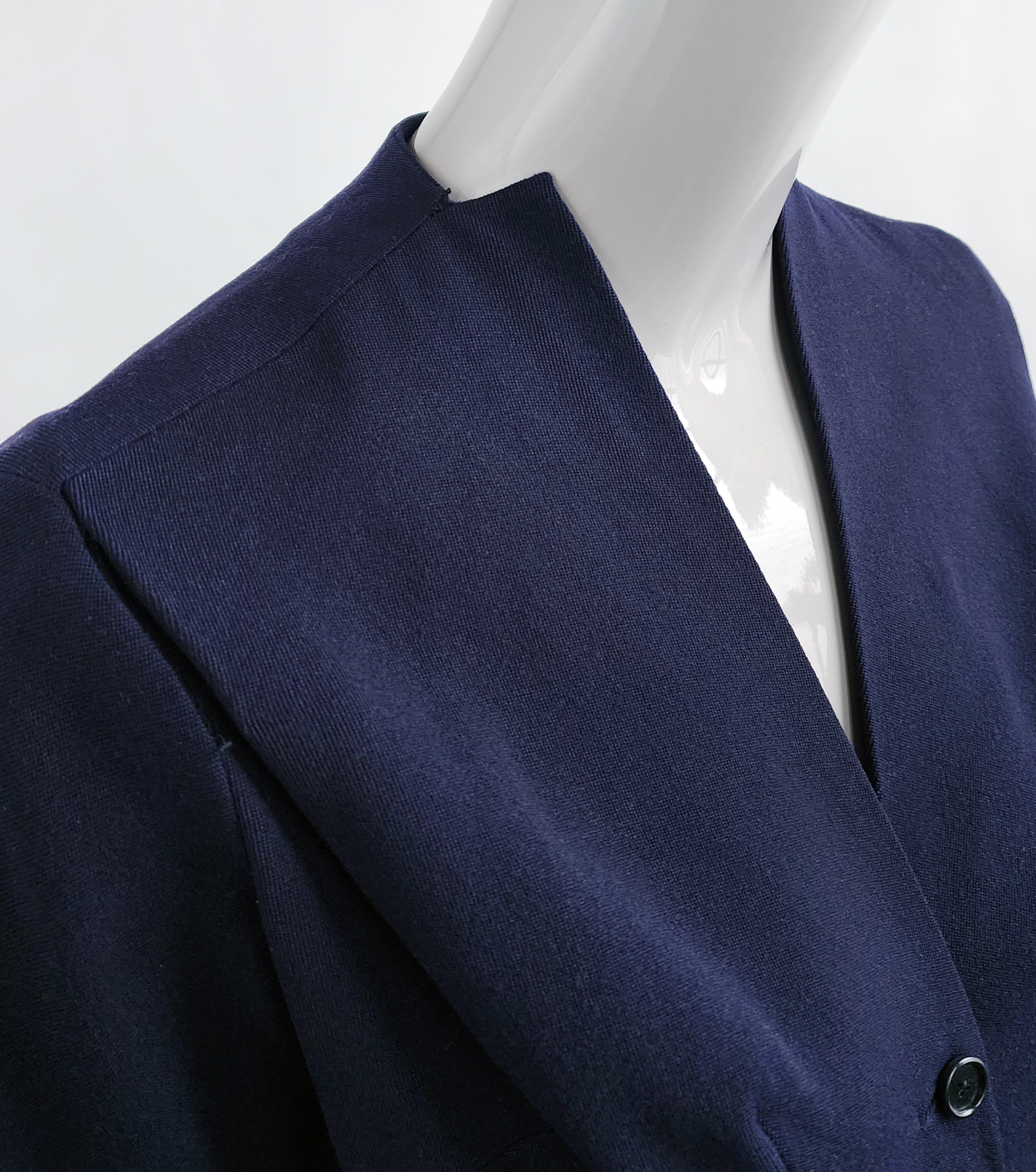
Detail of a Christian Dior Haute Couture wool barathea two-piece dress from Fall/Winter 1948.

Barathea, sometimes spelled barrathea, is a soft fabric with a broken twill weft rib, giving a surface that is lightly pebbled or ribbed, with the effect of a twill running both left and right. Originally developed as a cloth for mourning clothes in the 1840s, it took several decades to become popular for other purposes, due to its association with bereavement.

The yarns used are various combinations of wool, silk and cotton. Worsted barathea (made with a smooth wool yarn) is often used for evening coats, such as dress coats, dinner jackets, and military uniforms, in black and midnight blue. Silk barathea, either all silk, or using cotton weft and silken warp, is widely used in the necktie industry.
