= Coatee =

Type of tight-fitting uniform coat or jacket with short tails

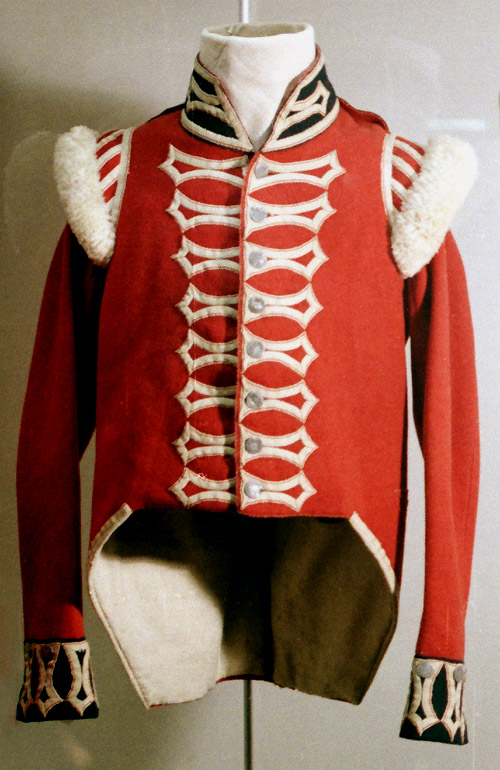
A British Army coatee from about 1815.

A coatee is a type of tight-fitting uniform coat or jacket, which is waist length at the front and has short tails behind. The coatee began to replace the long tail coat in western armies at the end of the eighteenth century, but was itself superseded by the tunic in the mid nineteenth century.

A coatee, worn with a waistcoat or vest, remains part of formal Highland dress.
