= Kilt =

Scottish skirt

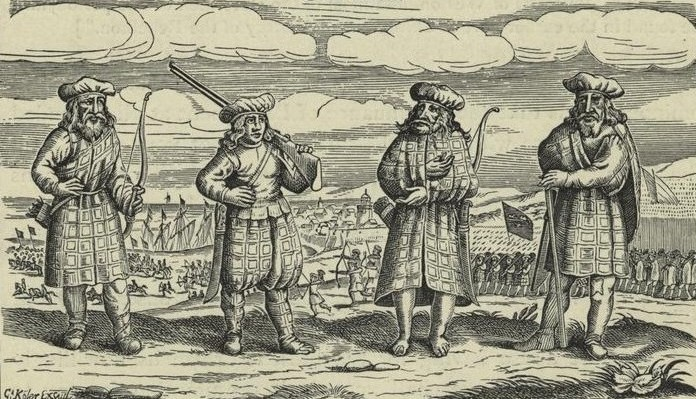
One of the earliest depictions of the kilt is this German print showing Highlanders around 1630.

A kilt (Scottish Gaelic: fèileadh [ˈfeːləɣ]) is a garment resembling a wrap-around knee-length skirt, made of twill-woven worsted wool with heavy pleats at the sides and back and traditionally a tartan pattern. Originating in the Scottish Highland dress for men, it is first recorded in the 16th century as the great kilt, a full-length garment whose upper half could be worn as a cloak. The small kilt or modern kilt emerged in the 18th century, and is essentially the bottom half of the great kilt. Since the 19th century, it has become associated with the wider culture of Scotland, and more broadly with Gaelic or Celtic heritage.

Although the kilt is most often worn by men on formal occasions and at Highland games and other sporting events, it has also been adapted as an item of informal male clothing, returning to its roots as an everyday garment. Kilts are now made for casual wear in a variety of materials. Alternative fastenings may be used and pockets inserted to avoid the need for a sporran. Kilts have also been adopted as female wear for some sports.

== History ==
The kilt was first recorded as the great kilt, the breacan or belted plaid, during the 16th century. The filleadh mòr or great kilt was a full-length garment whose upper half could be worn as a cloak draped over the shoulder, or brought up over the head. A version of the filleadh beag (philibeg), or small kilt (also known as the walking kilt), similar to the modern kilt was invented by an English Quaker from Lancashire named Thomas Rawlinson some time in the 1720s. He felt that the belted plaid was "cumbrous and unwieldy", and his solution was to separate the skirt and convert it into a distinct garment with pleats already sewn, which he himself began making. His associate, Iain MacDonnell, chief of the MacDonnells of Inverness, also began making it, and when clansmen employed in logging, charcoal manufacture and iron smelting saw their chief making the new apparel, they soon followed making the kilt. From there its making use spread "in the shortest space" amongst the Highlanders, and even amongst some of the Northern Lowlanders. It has been suggested there is evidence that the philibeg with unsewn pleats was made from the 1690s. The kilt's design continued to evolve over the centuries, adapting to practical needs.

== Variants ==
The name "kilt" is applied to a range of garments:

- The traditional garment, either in its historical form, or in the modern adaptation now usual in Scotland (see History of the kilt), usually in a tartan pattern
- The kilts worn by Irish pipe bands are based on the traditional Scottish garment but now in a single (solid) colour
- Variants of the Scottish kilt adopted in other Celtic nations, such as the Welsh cilt and the Cornish cilt

According to the Dictionary of the Scots Language and Oxford English Dictionary, the noun derives from a verb to kilt, originally meaning "to gird up; to tuck up (the skirts) round the body", which is apparently of Scandinavian origin.

=== Scotland ===
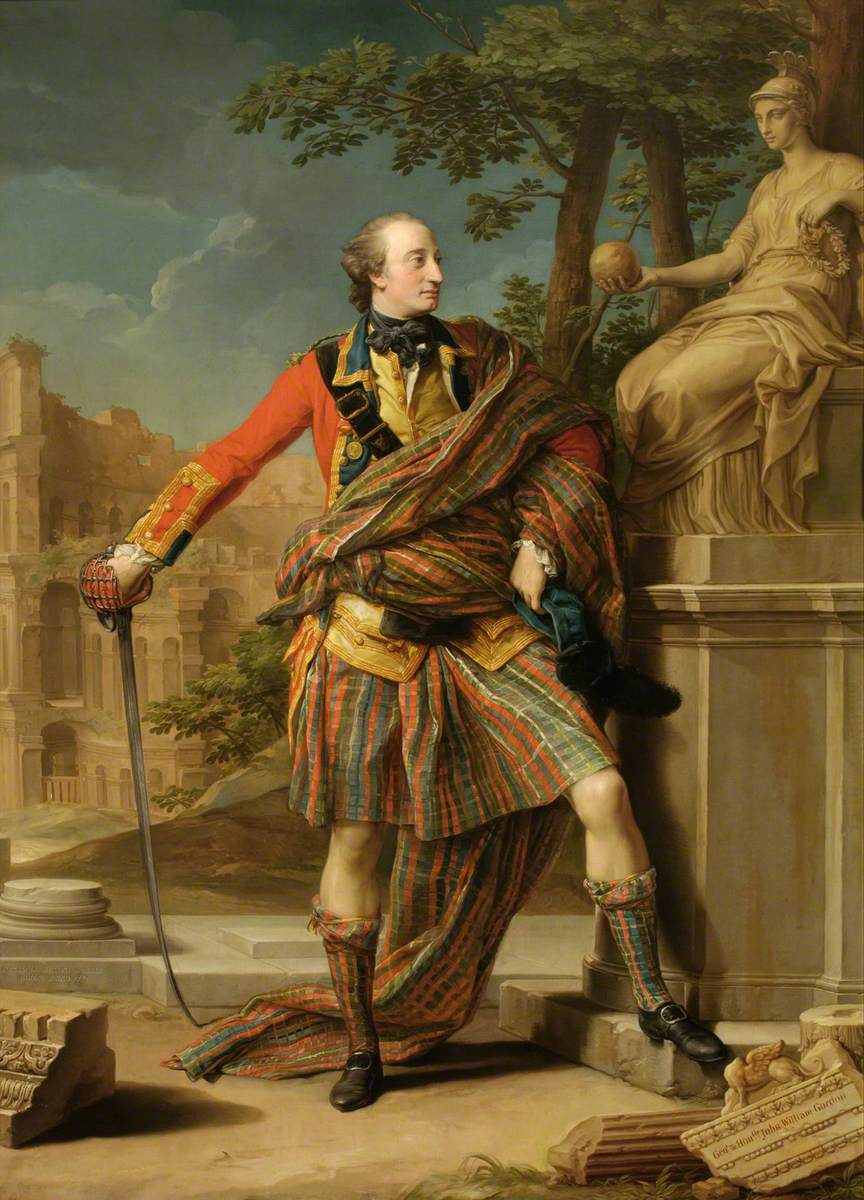
General William Gordon, shown wearing a kilt—part of the uniform of the short-lived 105th Regiment of Foot—in the Portrait of William Gordon by Pompeo Batoni (1765–66)

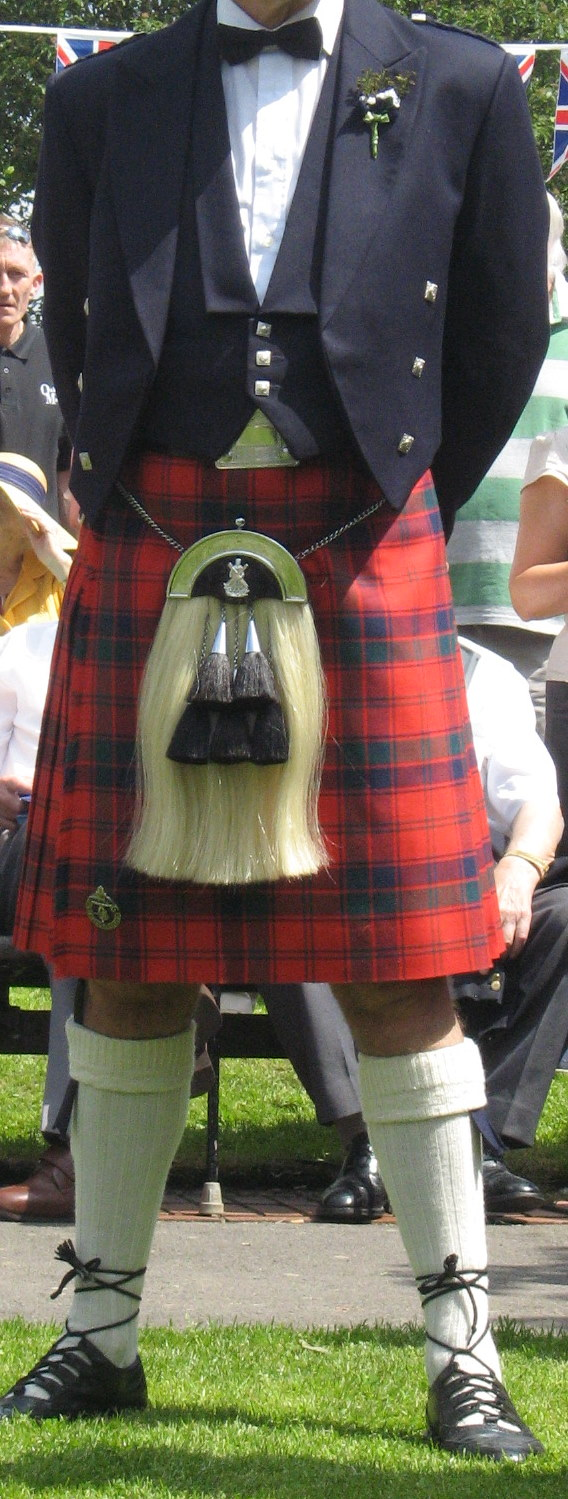
The modern Scottish kilt worn with formal evening wear (2009) and a highly decorative sporran hanging from the waist

Organisations that sanction and grade the competitions in Highland dancing and piping all have rules governing acceptable attire for the competitors. These rules specify that kilts are to be worn (except that in the national dances, the female competitors will be wearing the Aboyne dress).

==== Design and construction ====
The Scottish kilt displays uniqueness of design, construction, and convention which differentiate it from other garments fitting the general description. It is a tailored garment that is wrapped around the wearer's body at the natural waist (between the lowest rib and the hip) starting from one side (usually the wearer's left), around the front and back and across the front again to the opposite side. The fastenings consist of straps and buckles on both ends, the strap on the inside end usually passing through a slit in the waistband to be buckled on the outside; alternatively it may remain inside the waistband and be buckled inside.

A kilt covers the body from the waist down to the centre of the knees. The overlapping layers in front are called "aprons" and are flat; the single layer of fabric around the sides and back is pleated. A kilt pin may be fastened to the front apron on the free corner (but is not passed through the layer below, as its function is to add weight). Underwear may or may not be worn, as the wearer prefers, although tradition has it that a "true Scotsman" should wear nothing under his kilt. The Scottish Tartans Authority, however, warns that in some circumstances the practice could be "childish and unhygienic" and flying "in the face of decency".

==== Fabrics ====
The typical kilt as seen at modern Highland games events is made of twill woven worsted wool. The twill weave used for kilts is a "2–2 type", meaning that each weft thread passes over and under two warp threads at a time. The result is a distinctive diagonal-weave pattern in the fabric which is called the twill line. This kind of twill, when woven according to a given sett or written colour pattern (see below) is called tartan. In contrast kilts worn by Irish pipers are made from solid-colour cloth, with saffron or green being the most widely used colours.

Kilting fabric weights are given in ounces per yard and run from the very-heavy, regimental worsted of approximately 18–22 ounces (510–620 g) down to a light worsted of about 10–11 ounces (280–310 g). The most common weights for kilts are 13 ounces (370 g) and 16 ounces (450 g). The heavier weights are more appropriate for cooler weather, while the lighter weights would tend to be selected for warmer weather or for active use, such as Highland dancing. Some patterns are available in only a few weights.

A modern kilt for a typical adult uses about 6–8 yards of single-width (about 26–30 inches) or about 3–4 yards of double-width (about 54–60 inches) tartan fabric. Double-width fabric is woven so that the pattern exactly matches on the selvage. Kilts are usually made without a hem because a hem would make the garment too bulky and cause it to hang incorrectly. The exact amount of fabric needed depends upon several factors including the size of the sett, the number of pleats put into the garment, and the size of the person. For a full kilt, 8 yards of fabric would be used regardless of size and the number of pleats and depth of pleat would be adjusted according to their size. For a very large waist, it may be necessary to use 9 yards of cloth.

==== Setts ====
One of the most-distinctive features of the authentic Scots kilt is the tartan pattern, the sett, it exhibits. The association of particular patterns with individual clans and families can be traced back perhaps one or two centuries. It was only in the 19th-century Victorian era that the system of named tartans known today began to be systematically recorded and formalised, mostly by weaving companies for mercantile purposes. Up until this point, Highland tartans held regional associations rather than being identified with any particular clan.

Today there are also tartans for districts, counties, societies and corporations. There are also setts for states and provinces; schools and universities; sporting activities; individuals; and commemorative and simple generic patterns that anybody can wear (see History of the kilt for the process by which these associations came about).

Setts are always arranged horizontally and vertically, never diagonally (except when adapted for women's skirts). They are specified by their thread counts, the sequence of colours and their units of width. As an example, the Wallace tartan has a thread count given as "K/4 R32 K32 Y/4" (K is black, R is red, and Y is yellow). This means that 4 units of black thread will be succeeded by 32 units of red, etc., in both the warp and the weft. Typically, the units are the actual number of threads, but as long as the proportions are maintained, the resulting pattern will be the same. This thread count also includes a pivot point indicated by the slash between the colour and thread number. The weaver is supposed to reverse the weaving sequence at the pivot point to create a mirror image of the pattern. This is called a symmetrical tartan. Some tartans, like Buchanan, are asymmetrical, which means they do not have a pivot point. The weaver weaves the sequence all the way through and then starts at the beginning again for the next sett.

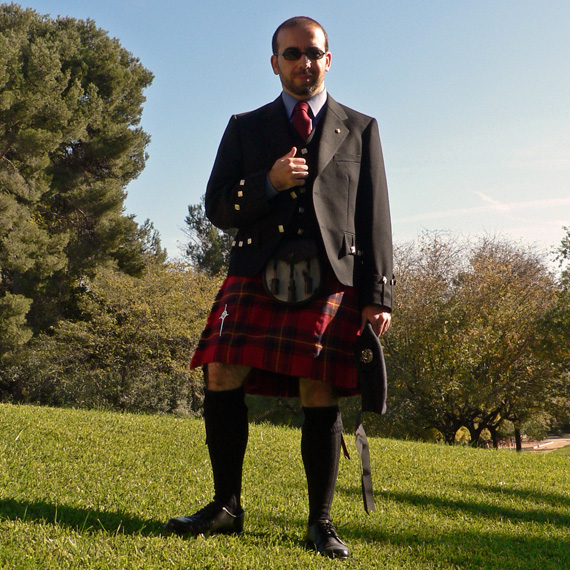
Oliver tartan kilt (2006)

Setts are further characterised by their size, the number of inches (or centimetres) in one full repeat. The size of a given sett depends on not only the number of threads in the repeat but also the weight of the fabric. This is because the heavier the fabric, the thicker the threads will be, and thus the same number of threads of a heavier-weight fabric will occupy more space. The colours given in the thread count are specified as in heraldry, although tartan patterns are not heraldic. The exact shade which is used is a matter of artistic freedom and will vary from one fabric mill to another as well as in dye lot to another within the same mill.

Tartans are commercially woven in four standard colour variations that describe the overall tone. "Ancient" or "Old" colours may be characterised by a slightly faded look intended to resemble the vegetable dyes that were once used, although in some cases "Old" simply identifies a tartan that was in use before the current one. Ancient greens and blues are lighter while reds appear orange. "Modern" colours are bright and show off modern aniline dyeing methods. The colours are bright red, dark hunter green, and usually navy blue. "Weathered" or "Reproduction" colours simulate the look of older cloth weathered by the elements. Greens turn to light brown, blues become grey, and reds are a deeper wine colour. The last colour variation is "Muted" which tends toward earth tones. The greens are olive, blues are slate blue, and red is an even deeper wine colour. This means that of the approximately 3500 registered tartans available in the Scottish Tartans Authority database as of 2004 there are four possible colour variations for each, resulting in around 14,000 recognised tartan choices.

Setts were registered until 2008, with the International Tartan Index (ITI) of the charitable organisation Scottish Tartans Authority (STA), which maintained a collection of fabric samples characterised by name and thread count, for free, which had its register, combined with others to form the Scottish Register of Tartans (SRT) of the statutory body the National Archives of Scotland (NAS), if the tartan meets SRT's criteria, for £70 as of 2010. Although many tartans are added every year, most of the registered patterns available today were created in the 19th century onward by commercial weavers who worked with a large variety of colours. The rise of Highland romanticism and the growing Anglicisation of Scottish culture by the Victorians at the time led to registering tartans with clan names. Before that, most of these patterns were more connected to geographical regions than to any clan. There is therefore nothing symbolic about the colours, and nothing about the patterns is a reflection of the status of the wearer.

==== Measurements ====
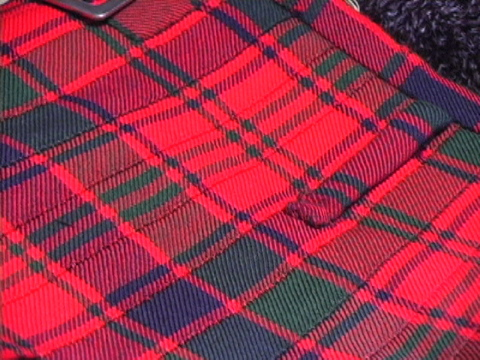
Stitching on the fell of a kilt (Robertson Red Modern)

Although ready-to-wear kilts can be obtained in standard sizes, a custom kilt is tailored to the individual proportions of the wearer. At least three measurements, the waist, hips, and length of the kilt, are usually required. Sometimes the rise (distance above the waist) or the fell (distance from waistline to the widest part of the hips) is also required.

A properly made kilt, when buckled on the tightest holes of the straps, is not so loose that the wearer can easily twist the kilt around their body, nor so tight that it causes "scalloping" of the fabric where it is buckled. Additionally, the length of the kilt when buckled at the waist reaches a point no lower than halfway across the kneecap and no higher than about an inch above it.

==== Pleating and stitching ====
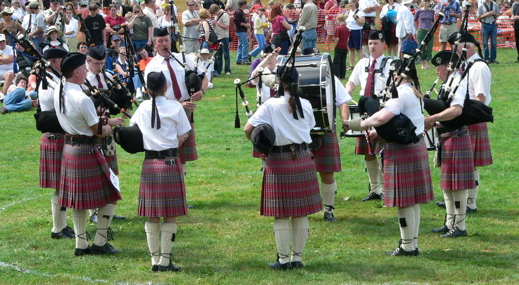
Pleating to the stripe (2005)

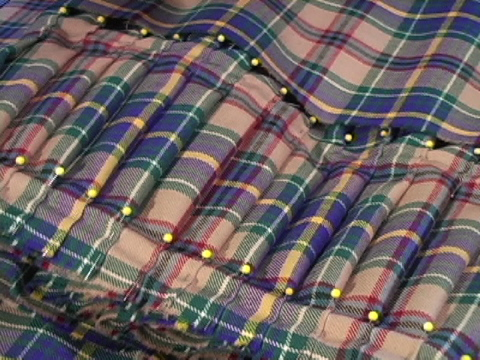
Pleating to the sett

A kilt can be pleated with either box or knife pleats. A knife pleat is a simple fold, while the box pleat is bulkier, consisting of two knife pleats back-to-back. Knife pleats are the most common in modern civilian kilts. Regimental traditions vary. The Argyll and Sutherland Highlanders use box pleats, while the Black Watch make their kilts of the same tartan with knife pleats. These traditions were also passed on to affiliated regiments in the Commonwealth, and were retained in successor battalions to these regiments in the amalgamated Royal Regiment of Scotland.

Pleats can be arranged relative to the pattern in two ways. In pleating to the stripe, one of the vertical stripes in the tartan is selected and the fabric is then folded so that this stripe runs down the center of each pleat. The result is that along the pleated section of the kilt (the back and sides) the pattern appears different from the unpleated front, often emphasising the horizontal bands rather than creating a balance between horizontal and vertical. This is often called military pleating because it is the style adopted by many military regiments. It is also widely used by pipe bands.

In pleating to the sett, the fabric is folded so that the pattern of the sett is maintained and is repeated all around the kilt. This is done by taking up one full sett in each pleat, or two full setts if they are small. This causes the pleated sections to have the same pattern as the unpleated front.

Any pleat is characterised by depth and width. The portion of the pleat that protrudes under the overlying pleat is the size or width. The pleat width is selected based on the size of the sett and the amount of fabric to be used in constructing the kilt, and will generally vary from about 1/2" to about 3/4".

The depth is the part of the pleat which is folded under the overlying pleat. It depends solely on the size of the tartan sett even when pleating to the stripe, since the sett determines the spacing of the stripes.

The number of pleats used in making kilts depends upon how much material is to be used in constructing the garment and upon the size of the sett.

The pleats across the fell are tapered slightly since the wearer's waist is usually narrower than the hips and the pleats are usually stitched down either by machine or by hand.

In Highland dancing, it is easy to see the effect of the stitching on the action of a kilt. The kilt hugs the dancer's body from the waist down to the hipline and, from there, in response to the dancer's movements, it breaks sharply out. The way the kilt moves in response to the dance steps is an important part of the dance. If the pleats were not stitched down in this portion of the kilt, the action, or movement, would be quite different. Kilts made for Highland dancing are typically pleated to the sett, as opposed to the stripe.

==== Accessories ====
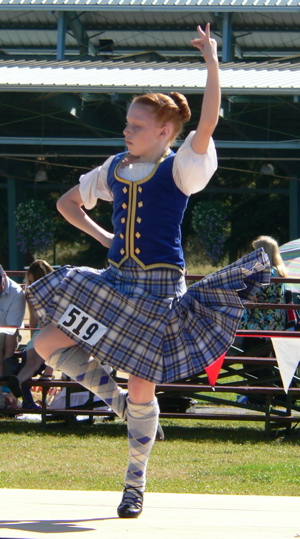
Highland dancer revealing the action of a kilt, worn here with a velvet waistcoat

The Scottish kilt is usually worn with kilt hose (woollen socks), turned down at the knee, often with garters and flashes, and a sporran (Gaelic for "purse": a type of pouch), which hangs around the waist from a chain or leather strap. This may be plain or embossed leather, or decorated with sealskin, fur, or polished metal plating.

Other common accessories, depending on the formality of the context, include:

- A belt (usually with embossed buckle)
- A jacket (of various traditional designs)
- A kilt pin
- A sgian-dubh (Gaelic: "black knife": a small sheathed knife worn in the top of the hose)
- Ghillie brogues
- Occasionally worn with a ghillie shirt, although this is more casual and, being a relatively modern invention, should not be confused with actual historic garments.

==== Styles of kilt wear ====
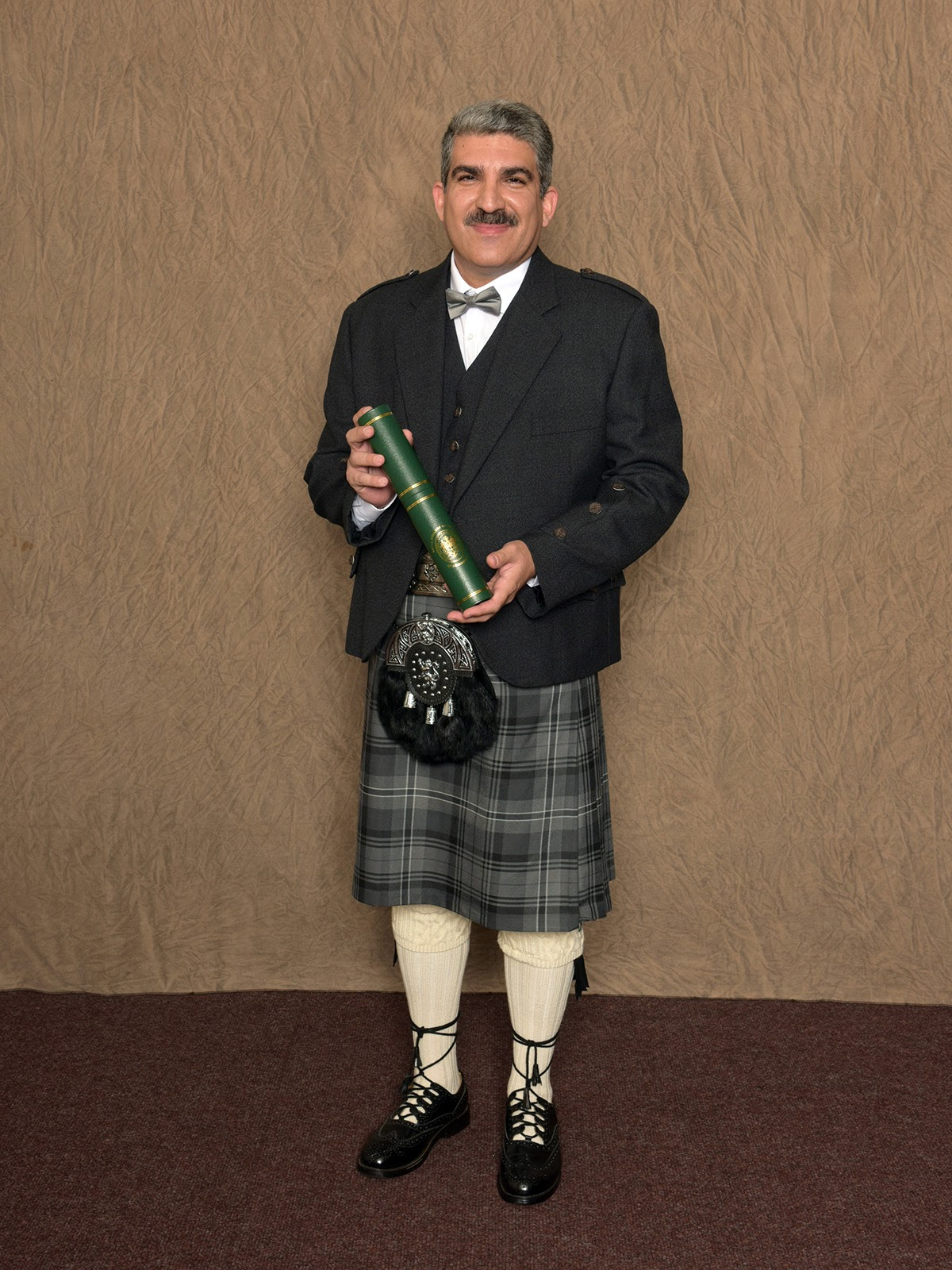
An Iraqi neurologist wears a kilt with an Argyll jacket at fellowship admission ceremony at the Royal College of Physicians of Edinburgh, November 2015

Today most Scottish people regard kilts as formal dress or national dress. Although there are still a few people who wear a kilt daily, it is generally owned or hired to be worn at weddings or other formal occasions and may be worn by anyone regardless of nationality or descent. For semi-formal wear, kilts are usually worn with a Prince Charlie coatee (worn with a black bow tie) or an Argyll jacket (worn with a black bow tie or a regular necktie). Full formal is white-tie and calls for a more formal coat, such as the Sherrifmuir doublet or regulation doublet. Irish formal dress is distinguished from Highland dress by the Brian Boru jacket, a modified Prince Charlie with a shawl collar, chain closure and round buttons. In all these cases, the coats are worn with an accompanying waistcoat (vest).

Kilts are also used for parades by groups such as the Boys' Brigade and Scouts, and in many places kilts are seen in force at Highland games and pipe band championships as well as being worn at Scottish country dances and ceilidhs.

Certain regiments and other units of the British Army and armies of other Commonwealth nations (including Australia, Canada, New Zealand, and South Africa) with a Scottish heritage still continue to wear kilts as part of dress or duty uniform, though they have not been used in combat since 1940 Uniforms in which kilts are worn include ceremonial dress, service dress, and barracks dress. Kilts are considered appropriate for ceremonial and less formal parades, office duties, walking out, mess dinners, classroom instruction, and band practice. Ceremonial kilts have also been developed for the US Marine Corps, and the pipe and drum bands of the US Military Academy, US Naval Academy, and Norwich University (the military college of Vermont).

It is becoming somewhat less rare to see them in the workplace. Casual use of kilts dressed down with lace-up boots or moccasins, and with T-shirts or golf shirts, is becoming increasingly familiar at Highland games. The kilt is associated with a sense of Scottish national pride and will often be seen being worn, along with a football top, when members of the Tartan Army are watching a football or rugby match. The small sgian-dubh knife is sometimes replaced by a wooden or plastic alternative or omitted altogether for security concerns; for example, it typically is not allowed to be worn or carried onto a commercial aircraft.

=== Ireland ===
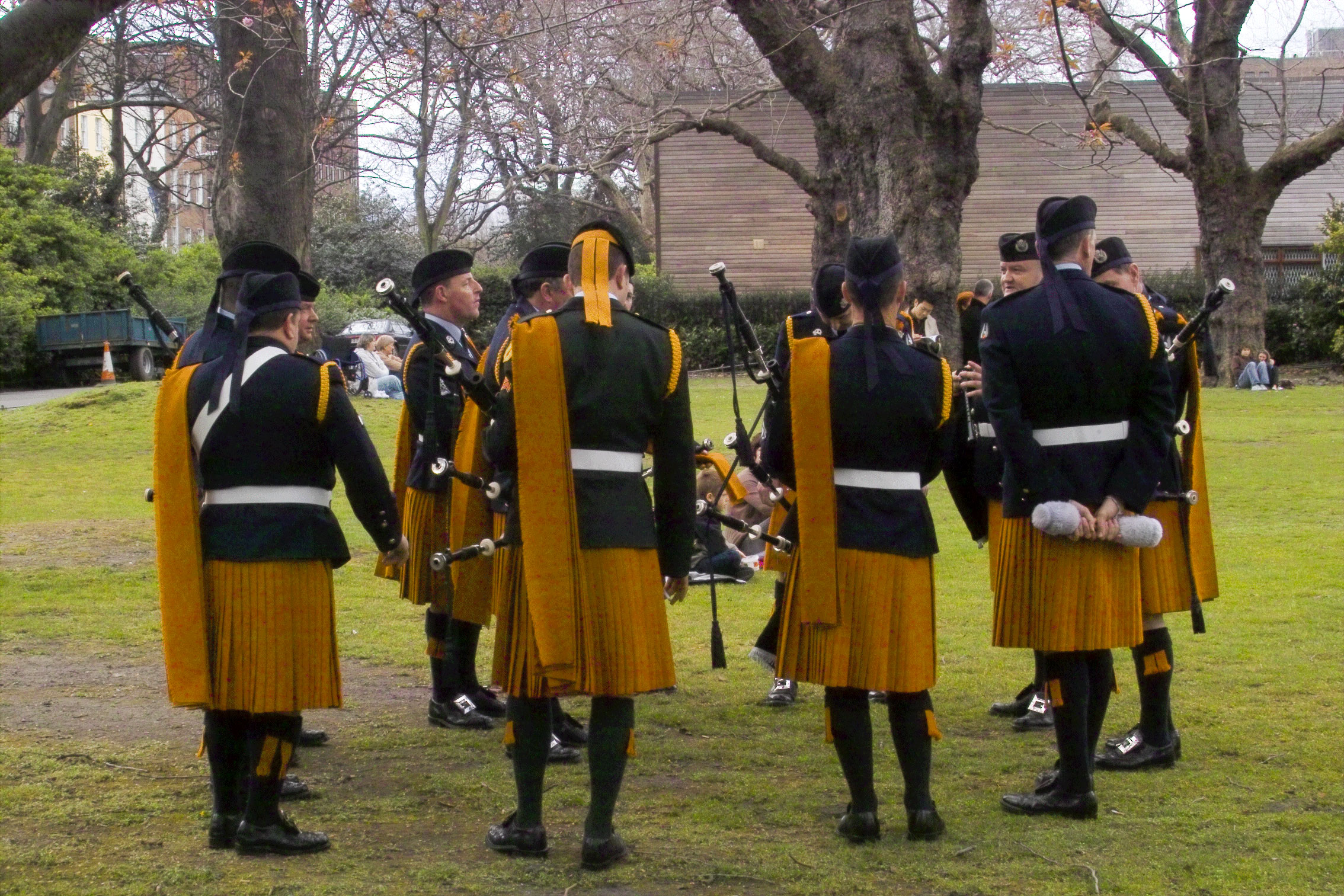
Irish Defence Force pipers wearing saffron kilts

Though the origins of the Irish kilt continue to be a subject of debate, current evidence suggests that kilts originated in the Scottish Highlands and Isles and were worn by Irish nationalists from at least 1850s onwards and then cemented from the early 1900s as a symbol of Gaelic identity.

A garment that has often been mistaken for kilts in early depictions is the Irish léine croich ('saffron shirt'), a long tunic traditionally made from yellow cloth, but also found in other solid colours (e.g. black, green, red, or brown), or striped. Solid-coloured kilts were first adopted for use by Irish nationalists and thereafter by Irish regiments serving in the British Army, but they could often be seen in late 19th and early 20th century photos in Ireland especially at political and musical gatherings, as the kilt was re-adopted as a symbol of Gaelic nationalism in Ireland during this period. Tartan was rarer in Irish kilts, as it was more expensive to manufacture. For the most part it was usually only used for sashes, trews and shawls. Wealthy Irish such as the Gaelic chieftains and high-ranking soldiers could afford tartan kilts.

Within the world of Irish dancing, boys' kilts have been largely abandoned, especially since the worldwide popularity of Riverdance and the revival and interest in Irish dancing generally.

The Irish still wear kilts but they are largely restricted to formal events and weddings. Irish marching bands often dress in kilts as well.

=== Other Celtic nations ===
Although not a traditional component of national dress outside Scotland or Ireland, kilts have become recently popular in the other Celtic nations as a sign of Celtic identity. Kilts and tartans can therefore also be seen in Wales, Cornwall, the Isle of Man, Brittany and Galicia; Northumbrian kilts in border tartan have also been adopted.

There are currently sixteen Breton tartans officially recorded in the Scottish tartan registries. The Breton tartans are: Brittany National (Breton National), Brittany Walking, Lead it Of, and a further nine county tartans (Kerne, Leon, Tregor, Gwened, Dol, St. Malo, Rennes, Nantes, St. Brieuc). Others have been recently created for smaller areas in Brittany (Ushent, Bro Vigoudenn and Menez Du "Black Mountain").

There are three Galician tartans recorded in the Scottish registries: Galicia, "Gallaecia – Galician National", and Bombeiros Voluntarios De Galicia. There is historical evidence of the use of tartan and kilt in Galicia up to the 18th century.

Kilts are also traditionally worn by some people in Austria, especially in Carinthia and Upper Austria, due to their Celtic heritage.

=== Contemporary designs ===
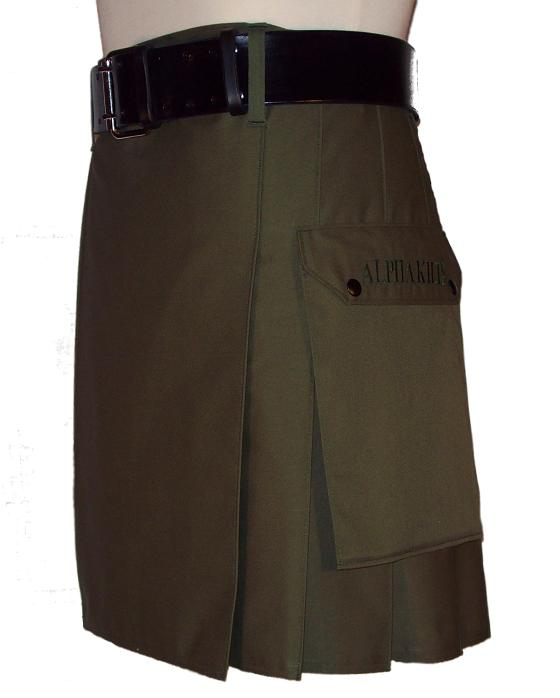
Example of contemporary kilt

Kilts and other male skirts in general were relaunched as a trend during the 1980s. Stephen Sprouse introduced a black denim mini-skirt over black denim jeans in 1983. Then in 1984, Jean Paul Gaultier made waves in the fashion industry when he reintroduced mini skirts and kilts for men.

Starting in the late 1990s, contemporary kilts (also known as modern kilts, fashion kilts, and, especially in the United States, utility kilts) have appeared in the clothing marketplace in Scotland, the US, and Canada in a range of fabrics, including leather, denim, corduroy, and cotton. They may be designed for formal or casual dress, for use in sports or outdoor recreation, or as white or blue collar workwear. Some are closely modelled on traditional Scottish kilts, but others are similar only in being knee-length skirt-like garments for men. They may have box pleats, symmetrical knife pleats and be fastened by snaps, studs or velcro instead of buckles. Many are designed to be worn without a sporran, and may have pockets or tool belts attached.

In Canada, kilts are widely common as part of female dress at schools with a uniform policy. As well, due to the rich Scottish heritage of the country, they may frequently be seen at weddings and formal events. In Nova Scotia, they may even be worn as common daily attire.

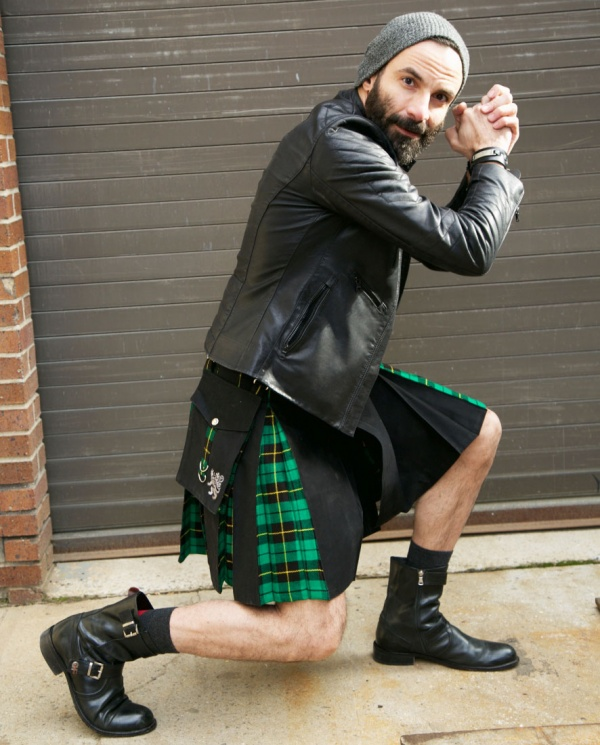
Contemporary hybrid kilt

In 2008, a USPS letter carrier, Dean Peterson, made a formal proposal that the kilt be approved as an acceptable postal uniform—for reasons of comfort. The proposal was defeated at the convention of the 220,000-member National Association of Letter Carriers in 2008 by a large margin.

5.11 Tactical produced a "tactical duty kilt" as an April Fools' joke but has continued producing it. The contemporary hybrid kilts are made up of tartan-woven fabric material.

Female athletes, especially lacrosse and field hockey players, often wear lacrosse kilts, a simple form of contemporary kilt. They will typically wear compression shorts or spandex underneath. Such kilts are popular among many levels of lacrosse, from youth leagues to college leagues, although some teams are replacing the kilt with the more streamlined athletic skirt.

Men's kilts are often seen in popular contemporary media. For example, in the Syfy series Tin Man, side characters are shown wearing kilts as peasant working clothes. Trends in everyday fashion, especially in the Gothic subculture, have led to a popularisation of the kilt as an alternative to more conventional menswear. Some of these are made of PVC or cotton-polyester blends.

== See also ==
- Arisaid
- Belted plaid
- Dhoti
- Fly plaid
- Full plaid
- Fustanella
- Highland dress
- Lungi
- Men's skirts
- Shendyt
- Tartan
- Trews
- True Scotsman
- Wrap (clothing)

== Bibliography ==
- Trevor-Roper, Hugh; Hobsbawm, Eric; Ranger, Terence, eds. (1983), The Invention of Tradition, United Kingdom: Cambridge University Press, ISBN 0-521-24645-8.
- Thomson, Thomas, ed. (1816), Annals of Philosophy, vol. VIII, London: Baldwin, Cradock and Joy
