= Fly plaid =

Type of Scottish Highland dress

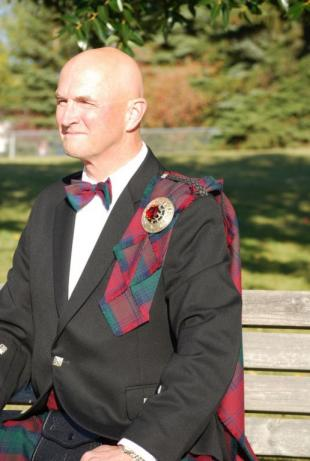
A man wearing a fly plaid

In Highland dress, the modern fly plaid originated with the traditional Great Plaid (Scottish Gaelic: Féileadh Mòr) worn in the Scottish Highlands. The Great Plaid was a large piece of cloth, which by the 16th century measured up to 8.2 metres (9.0 yards) in length, half of which was pleated and belted about the waist, while the upper half was draped over the left shoulder, was then gathered in front and could be used as a cloak and hood during inclement weather.

The fly plaid harkens back to that garment and was introduced in the 18th century when fashion dictated a switch to the modern kilt. The fly plaid replaced that portion of the Great Kilt that was draped over the shoulder. It is today typically worn in two lengths, from about a metre (39 inches) square to 1.4 metres (56 inches) square (54 inches being a standard fabric width). It is worn in the same tartan or colour as the kilt.

It is typically worn with a jacket that has epaulets, but this is not mandatory, and brooch.

Some fly plaids are sewn so that one corner is gathered prior to attaching the brooch. Others are not sewn and are pleated by hand before draping over the shoulder or inserting through an epaulet.

== See also ==
- Full plaid, a longer, pleated, tartan-cloth mantle, wrapped around the upper body and then thrown over the shoulder
- Belted plaid or "great kilt", an earlier form of the kilt, it was a large plaid (blanket) pleated by hand and belted around the waist
- Maud (plaid), a cloth mantle made in a small black-and-white chequered pattern
