= Queen's Regiment (disambiguation) =

The Queen's Regiment (QUEENS) was an infantry regiment of the British Army formed in 1966.

Several other regiments in the British Army have held the title of "Queen's Regiment":

- A royalist Queen's Regiment of Horse that took part in English Civil War and was heavily defeated at Shelford Priory, Nottinghamshire, in 1645
- 2nd Dragoon Guards (Queen's Bays), known as the Queen's Regiment of Dragoon Guards, formed in 1685
- Queen's Regiment of Foot, a previous (1685) name of the King's Own Royal Regiment (Lancaster)
- Queen's Regiment of Horse, a previous (1685) name of the 1st King's Dragoon Guards
- Queen's Royal Regiment (West Surrey) was a line infantry regiment of the English and later the British Army from 1661 to 1959
- 16th The Queen's Lancers, a cavalry regiment of the British Army formed in 1759
- 105th Regiment of Foot (Queen's Own Royal Regiment of Highlanders) of the later Seven Years' War
- The Queen's Regiment of Light Infantry Militia, a previous (1850s) name of the Queen's Edinburgh Light Infantry Militia
- 16th/5th The Queen's Royal Lancers, a cavalry regiment of the British Army formed in 1922
