= History of the kilt =

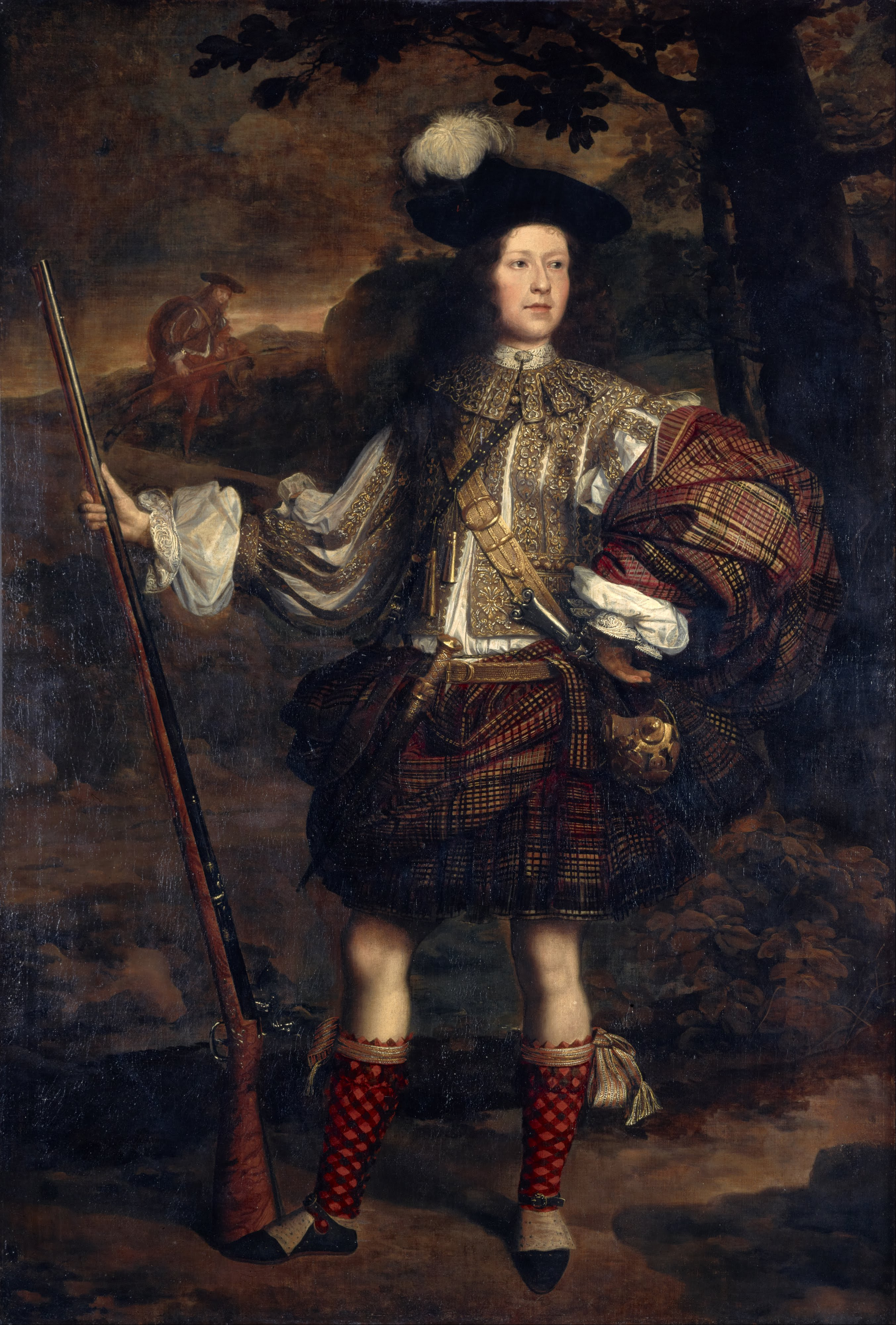
Highland chieftain Lord Mungo Murray wearing belted plaid, around 1680.

The history of the modern kilt stretches back to at least the end of the 16th century. The kilt first appeared as the belted plaid or great kilt, a full-length garment whose upper half could be worn as a cloak draped over the shoulder, or brought up over the head as a hood. The small kilt or walking kilt (similar to the modern or military kilt) did not develop until the late 17th or early 18th century, and is essentially the bottom half of the great kilt.

The noun kilt comes from the Scots verb kilt meaning 'to tuck up the clothes around the body'. The Scots word derives from the Old Norse kjalta (meaning 'lap', 'fold of a gathered skirt').

== The great kilt ==
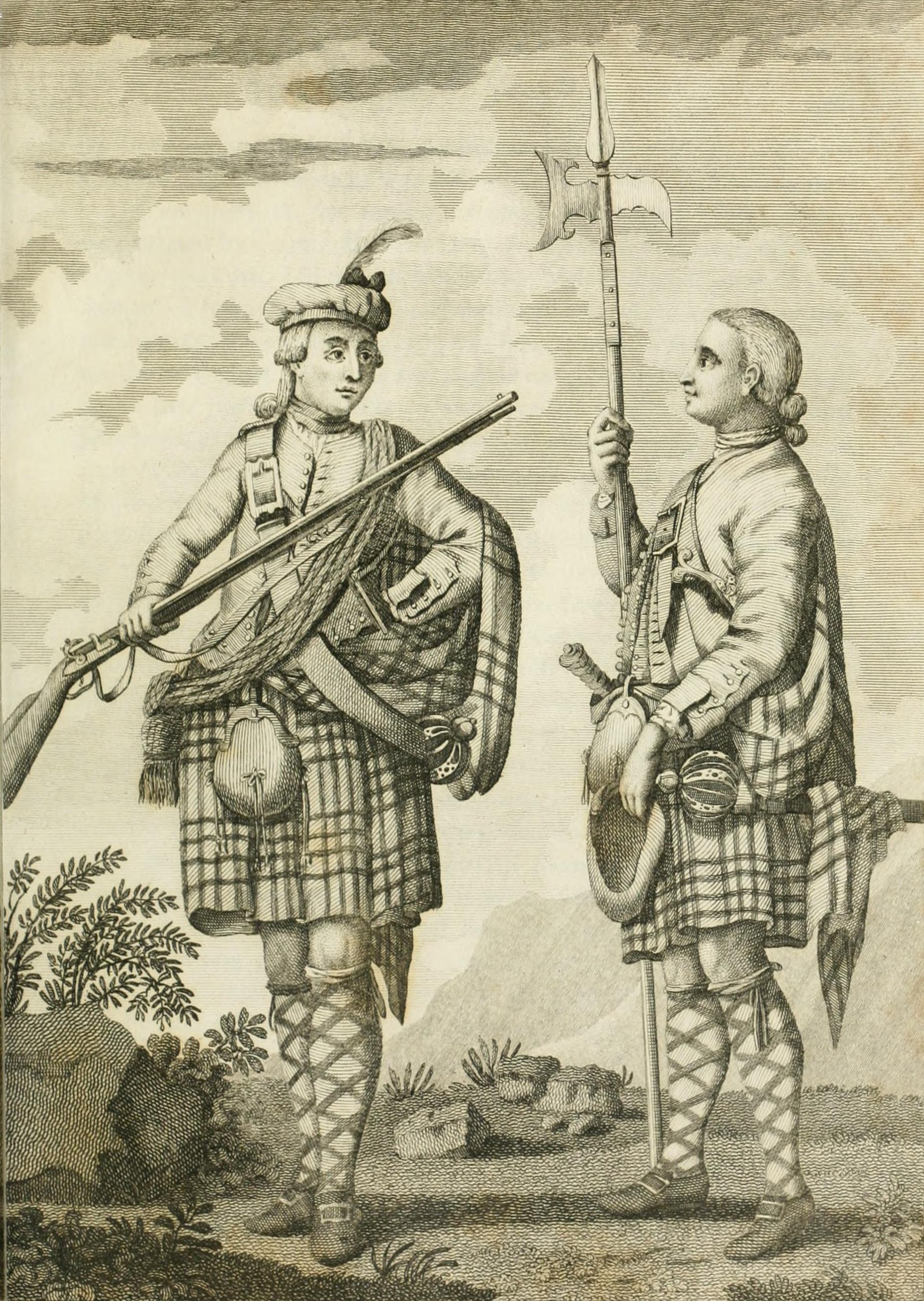
Highland soldiers in 1740, an early picture of great kilt, with the plaid being used to protect the musket lock from rain and wind.

The belted plaid (breacan an fhéilidh) or great plaid (feileadh mòr), also known as the great kilt, is likely to have evolved over the course of the 16th century from the earlier "brat" or woollen cloak (also known as a plaid) which was worn over a tunic (the léine), which was also worn by the Gaelic Irish. This earlier cloak may have been plain in colour or in various check or tartan designs, depending on the wealth of the wearer; this earlier fashion of clothing had not changed significantly from that worn by Celtic warriors in Roman times.

Over the course of the 16th century, with the increasing availability of wool, the cloak had grown to such a size that it began to be gathered up and belted. The belted plaid was originally a length of thick woollen cloth made up from two loom-widths sewn together to give a total width of 54 to 60 inches (140 to 150 cm), and up to 7 yards (6.4 m) in length. This garment was gathered up into pleats and secured by a wide belt.

Plaids with belt loops were in use by the 18th century. A surviving men's belted plaid from 1822 has a belt loops sewn inside it at each pattern repeat, such that it can be unpleated entirely into a blanket, or rapidly pleated with a hidden drawstring belt (with a second belt worn outside, to flatten the pleats, as in the portrait of Lord Mungo Murray above).

The upper half could be worn as a cloak draped over the left shoulder, hung down over the belt and gathered up at the front, or brought up over the shoulders or head for protection against weather. It was worn over a léine (a full-sleeved tunic stopping below the waist) and could also serve as a camping blanket.

A description from 1746 states:

The garb is certainly very loose, and fits men inured to it to go through great fatigues, to make very quick marches, to bear out against the inclemency of the weather, to wade through rivers, and shelter in huts, woods, and rocks upon occasion; which men dressed in the low country garb could not possibly endure.

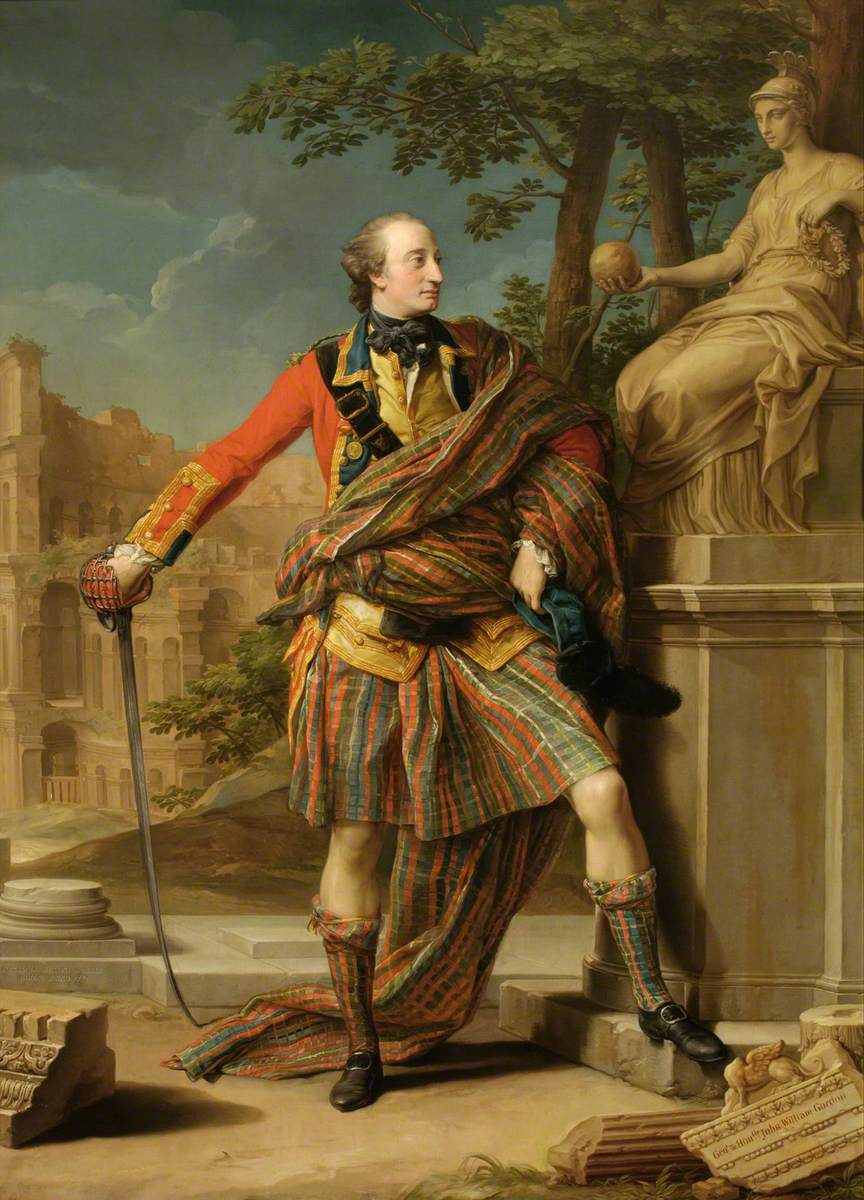
General William Gordon, shown wearing a belted plaid – possibly the uniform of the short-lived 105th Regiment of Foot – in the Portrait of William Gordon by Pompeo Batoni (1765–66).

For battle, it was customary to take off the plaid beforehand and set it aside, the Highland charge being made wearing only the léine croich or war shirt, a knee-length shirt of leather, linen, or canvas, heavily pleated and sometimes quilted as protection.

The exact age of the great kilt is still under debate. Earlier carvings or illustrations prior to the 16th century appearing to show the kilt may show the léine. The earliest written source that definitely describes the belted plaid or great kilt comes from 1594. The great kilt is mostly associated with the Scottish Highlands, but was also used in poor Lowlands rural areas. Widespread use of this type of kilt continued into the 19th century, and some still wear it today (kiltmakers who still supply great kilts offer them primarily as highly formal attire – equivalent to white-tie evening wear – typically paired with a Sheriffmuir doublet and a ruffled jabot).

== The small kilt or walking kilt ==
Sometime in the late 17th or early 18th century the small kilt (fèileadh beag, anglicised as filibeg or philabeg), using a single width of cloth worn hanging down below the belt came into use, becoming popular throughout the Highlands and northern Lowlands by 1746, although the great kilt or belted plaid continued to be worn. The small kilt is a development from the great kilt, being essentially its bottom half.

The tailored kilt was adopted by the Highland regiments of the British Army, and the military kilt and its formalised accessories passed into civilian usage during the early 19th century and have remained popular ever since.

The earliest extant example of a tailored kilt is from c. 1796 (currently in the possession of the Scottish Tartans Authority). A regimental kilt of the Gordon Highlanders (92nd Regiment of Foot) from c. 1817 still survives in remarkable condition at the National Army Museum.

=== Dispute about invention ===
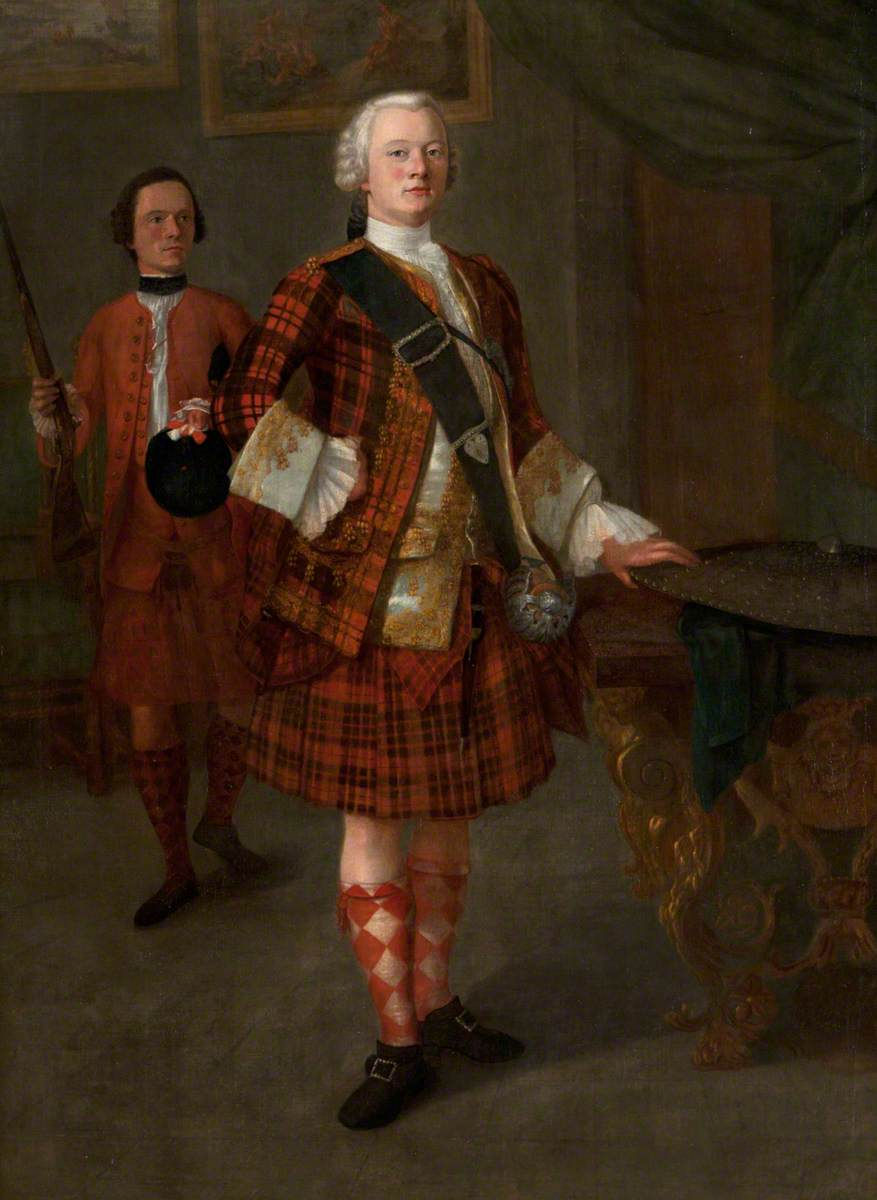
Alastair Ruadh MacDonnell, c. 1747, in a belted plaid with a retainer in the small kilt, probably the first to appear in a portrait.

A letter written by Ivan Baillie in 1768 and published in the Edinburgh Magazine in March 1785 states that the garment people would recognize as a kilt today was invented in the 1720s by Thomas Rawlinson, a Quaker from Lancashire. After the Jacobite campaign of 1715, the government opened the Highlands to outside exploitation, and Rawlinson went into partnership with Ian MacDonnell, chief of the MacDonnells of Glengarry, to manufacture charcoal from the forests near Inverness and smelt iron ore there. So the story goes, the belted plaid worn by the Highlanders he employed was too "cumbrous and unwieldy" for this work, so, together with the tailor of the regiment stationed at Inverness, Rawlinson produced a kilt which consisted of the lower half of the belted plaid worn as a "distinct garment with pleats already sewn". He wore it himself, as did his business partner, whose clansmen then followed suit.

Maj. H. R. Duff (1815) repeated the story, in short form, as fact in his Culloden Papers, and Sir Walter Scott (1816) agreed with him in a review of the book. David Stewart of Garth (1825) wrote of the story as being unsubstantiated, and "one of the arguments brought forward by some modern authors, to prove that the Highland garb is of recent introduction." Some 19th-century writers supported the notion of the story but did not get the details correct: John MacCulloch (1824) remembered the name "Rawlinson", but placed the events at a lead mine in Tyndrum, while John Sinclair (1830) wrote "it is well known that the phillibeg was invented by an Englishman", but then got the location and date wrong. A 1914 article in Celtic Review considered that the story not appearing until half a century after the alleged invention was suspicious.

Reactions of 20th- and 21st-century researchers to the Rawlinson story have been mixed. J. G. Mackay (1924) calls it a "myth" without "credence", but one difficult to dispel for having gone so long without "a serious attempt to contradict it". He suspects a military-political motivation behind the letter: "There was at that time, as on several occasions since, an attempt being made to have the wearing of the [Highland] dress by the Highland regiments discontinued ... and the article in question was written with the intention of discrediting the dress as a national garb." Sir Thomas Innes of Learney (1939/1971) calls it a "wretched story". Barnes & Kennedy (1956) say the idea "was attributed" to Rawlinson, without taking a side. John Telfer Dunbar (1979) takes the letter at face value, and Hugh Trevor-Roper (1983) accepts it without much question, relying on it heavily in a later posthumous volume (2008). Banks & de La Chapelle (2007) label the story a "legend", accept the location, then suggest that the workers themselves may have invented the short kilt. Murray Pittock (2010) wrote that "it is ... ridiculous to suppose that an English Quaker industrialist could determine the sartorial priorities of ... a national culture" and that the story was characterised by "easy vehemence and lack of either rigour or depth". John Purser (2020) reports that there is no evidence to support the story in Rawlinson's own copious detailed papers.

It has been suggested by Matthew Newsome (2000) that there is evidence of Highlanders wearing only the bottom part of the belted plaid before this, as early as the 1690s. Innes of Learney cited a 1661 map of Aberdeen by James Gordon of Rothiemay as possibly illustrating a short kilt; "[Gordon's] evidence is not confined to his illustration, for he describes the garment as 'folded all round the body about the region of the belt'". (Note: The 1661 map, also cited by Mackay (1924), can be examined, with ability to zoom in on detail (the figure in question is just above the map's distance scale), here: "Abredoniae novae et veteris descriptio - A description of new and of old Aberdeen". Maps.NLS.uk. National Library of Scotland. 2014.) Dunbar argued that because the engraver was Dutch that the outfit represented Dutch costume; he did not address the textual description. Earlier, D. W. Stewart (1893) also argued for evidence of 17th-century use, though the materials he was reading are not very clear, and Dunbar argues against his interpretations. Mackay further suggests Scottish coats of arms published in 1659 and 1673 show supporters in small kilts, and A. Campbell (1899) did likewise, as did Innes of Learney; Dunbar again offered a conflicting opinion. Mackay also quoted c. 1715 Scots Jacobite songs that specifically mentioned the "philabeg", and mid-17th-century sources that seem to treat the plaid and kilt as separate garments. J. F. Campbell (1862) also pointed out such material. A similar passage appears in William Brereton's Travels, written 1634–35.

A 1677 account by one Thomas Kirk of Yorkshire described Scotsmen wearing "a sort of breeches, not unlike a petticoat, that reaches not so low, by far, as their knees. ... with a plaid over the left shoulder and under the right arm ...." Dunbar, relying on H. F. McClintock (1943), argues that it is not clear that the "petticoat" and plaid were separate garments (i.e., that the entire getup could have been a belted plaid). Dunbar called it "an ambiguous reference" that has been "furiously" debated. Mackay raised a point of logic: Since the belted plaid was made of two pieces of tartan cloth stitched together to provide the necessary top-to-bottom span, "It is surely too great a strain upon our credulity to ask us to believe" that no one before Rawlinson ever thought to use the lower one by itself. J.-A. Henderson (2000) accepts the historical visual evidence: "The idea of making the [belted] plaid shorter probably occurred to several people, as a smattering of early pictures show"; but he considers Rawlinson to have popularised the idea.

All of the above is typical of the long-running debate, with different authors (often with unkind words for the opposition) offering their opinions and some evidence, with neither viewpoint clearly having the evidentiary upper-hand. Professor and museum curator Hugh Cheape wrote of the dispute: "Such a debate has tended to be circular, without adding much more than value judgement to our knowledge of Highland dress."

Nonetheless, the kilt of Rawlinson's factory is the earliest documented example with sewn-in pleats, a distinctive feature of the kilt worn today. Probably the earliest portrait unambiguously featuring a small kilt is one of Alastair Ruadh MacDonnell of Glengarry (in a belted plaid and tartan jacket), son of the aforementioned Ian MacDonnell, with a retainer in the background in the small kilt. The artist is unknown, and the painting is loosely dated to c. 1747. Dunbar argued that the location of Glengarry supported the idea of the small kilt originating there.

== Proscription and revival of the kilt ==
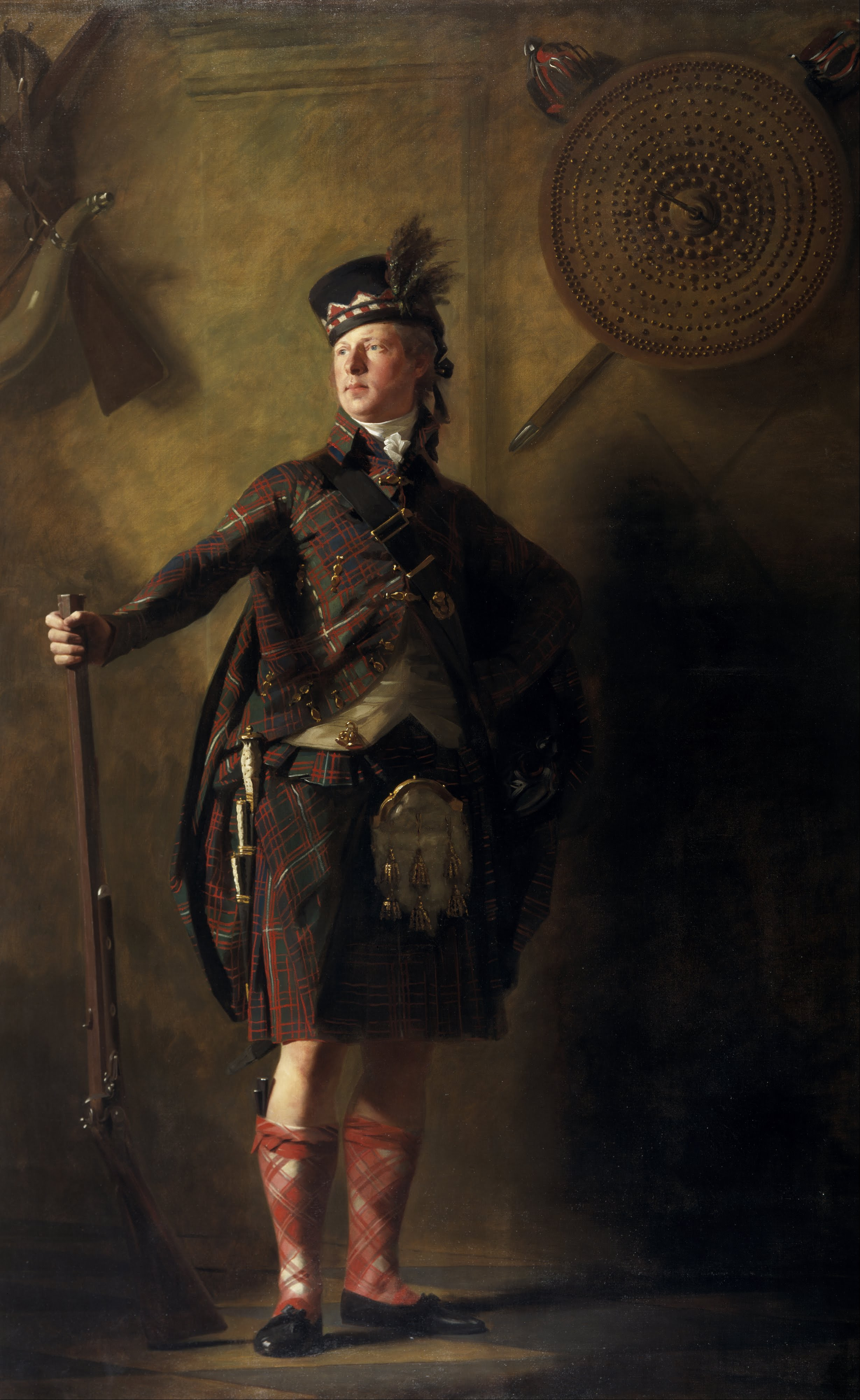
Portrait by Henry Raeburn of Alexander Ranaldson MacDonell of Glengarry in 1812.

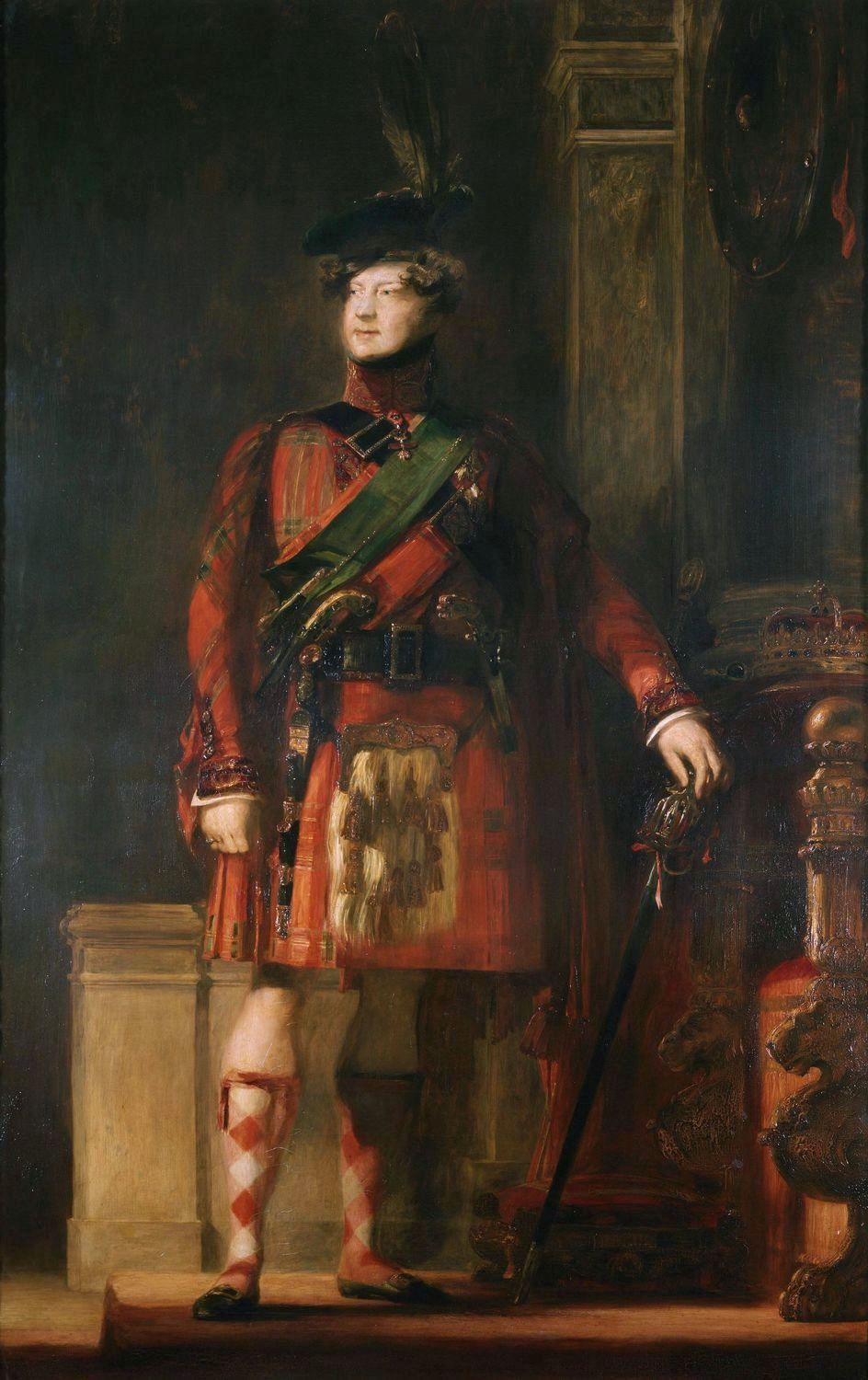
George IV in Highland Dress, 1829. David Wilkie's 1829 flattering portrait of the kilted King George IV, with lighting chosen to tone down the brightness of his kilt and his knees shown bare, without the pink tights he actually wore at the event in 1822.

A characteristic of the Highland clan system was that clansmen felt loyalty only to God, their monarch, and their clan chief. The Jacobite risings demonstrated the dangers to central government of such warrior Highland clans, and as part of a series of measures the government of King George II imposed the "Dress Act" in 1746, outlawing men and boys wearing items of Highland dress including kilts (although an exception was made for the Highland regiments) with the intent of suppressing Highland culture. The penalties were severe; six months' imprisonment for the first offense and seven years' transportation for the second. The ban remained in effect for 35 years.

1815 cartoon of Parisian women sneakily looking at kilted Scottish soldiers

Thus, with the exception of the Army and those who served in it, the kilt went out of use in the Scottish Highlands, but during those years it became fashionable for Scottish romantics to wear kilts as a form of protest against the ban. This was an age that romanticised "primitive" peoples, which is how Highlanders were viewed. Most Lowlanders had viewed Highlanders with fear before 1745, but many identified with them after their power was broken. The kilt, along with other features of Gaelic culture, had become identified with Jacobitism, and now that this had ceased to be a real danger it was viewed with romantic nostalgia.

Once the ban was lifted in 1782, Highland landowners set up Highland Societies with aims including "improvements" (which others would call the Highland clearances) and promoting "the general use of the ancient Highland dress". The Celtic Society of Edinburgh, chaired by Walter Scott, encouraged lowlanders to join this antiquarian enthusiasm.

The kilt became identified with the whole of Scotland with the pageantry of the visit of King George IV to Scotland in 1822, even though 9 out of 10 Scots now lived in the Lowlands. Scott and the Highland societies organised a "gathering of the Gael" and established entirely new Scottish "invented traditions", including Lowlanders wearing a stylised version of the traditional garment of the Highlanders. At this time many other traditions such as clan identification by tartan were developed (prior to this, tartans were identified with regions, not specific clans).

After that point, the kilt gathered momentum as an emblem of Scottish culture as identified by antiquarians, romantics, and others, who spent much effort praising the "ancient" and natural qualities of the kilt. King George IV had appeared in a spectacular kilt, and his successor Queen Victoria dressed her boys in the kilt, widening its appeal. The kilt became part of the Scottish national identity and the wider Celtic identity.

== Military use ==
From 1624, the Independent Highland Companies had worn kilts as government troops, and with their amalgamation into the Earl of Crawford's Highland Regiment, 43rd (later 42nd) Regiment of Foot, in 1739, their small-kilt uniform was standardised with a new dark tartan, today known as "Black Watch", "Government 1", "old Campbell", and other names. (Their great-kilt tartan was different, and has been lost.)

Many Jacobite rebels adopted kilts as an informal uniform, with even their English supporters wearing tartan items during the Jacobite rising of 1745. In the aftermath of that rebellion the Government decided to form more Highland regiments for the army in order to direct the energies of Gaels, that "hardy and intrepid race of men". In doing so, they formed effective new army regiments to send to fight in India, North America, and other locations while lowering the possibility of rebellion at home. Army uniforms were exempt from the ban on wearing kilts in the Dress Act, and as a means of identification, the regiments were given different tartans. These regiments opted for the modern kilts for undress uniforms, and while the great kilt remained as dress uniform this was phased out by the early 19th century.

Many Scottish units wore the kilt in combat during the First World War. A common misconception is that the Scottish had gained nicknames such as 'Devils in Skirts' or 'Ladies from Hell' by Germans during the First World War, but there is a lack of evidence of Germans ever using such terms, and most likely were invented by the Scottish themselves. The Highland regiments of the Commonwealth armies entered the Second World War wearing the kilt, but it was rapidly recognized as impractical for modern warfare, and in the first year of the war was officially banned as combat dress. The Queen's Own Cameron Highlanders had already been deployed to France before the order came into effect, and so were the last regiment to wear the kilt in action at the Battle of Dunkirk on 27 May 1940. However, on D-Day, June 1944, Lord Lovat, commander of 1 Special Service Brigade, was accompanied by his personal piper Bill Millin, who wore a kilt– and played the bagpipes – while German bullets whizzed around him. Capt. Ogilvie of the Glider Pilot Regiment landed in a kilt at Arnhem.

The kerns of Gaelic Ireland wore the long léine, or 'saffron shirt' (often misinterpreted as a kilt in depictions), which may have had connections with the predecessor of the modern kilt. This tradition has been continued in the pipe bands of the Republic of Ireland's defence forces.

The kilt is utilized in the modern full-dress uniforms for multiple active Scottish regiments of the British Army who have some affiliation with Scotland. This includes the Royal Regiment of Scotland, Scots Guards, Royal Scots Dragoon Guards, and many other units.

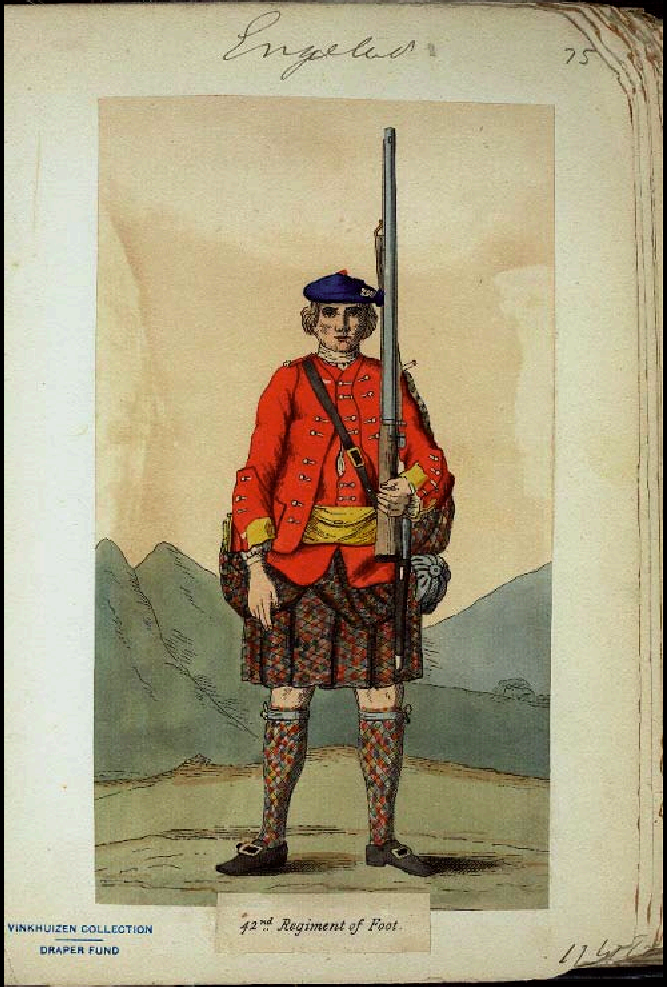
A private from the 42nd Regiment of Foot, 1742

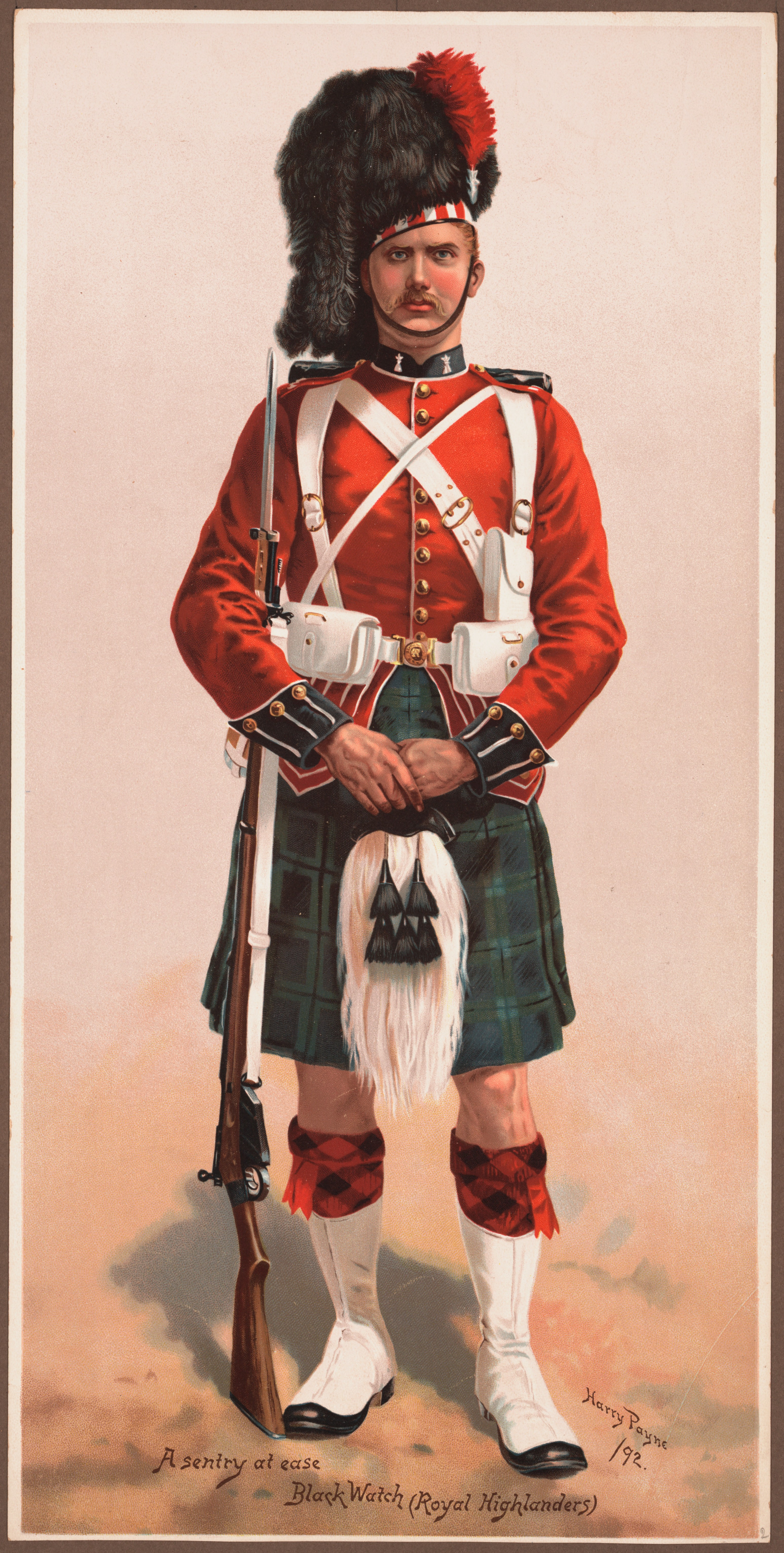
A private of the Black Watch (Royal Highlanders), 1892

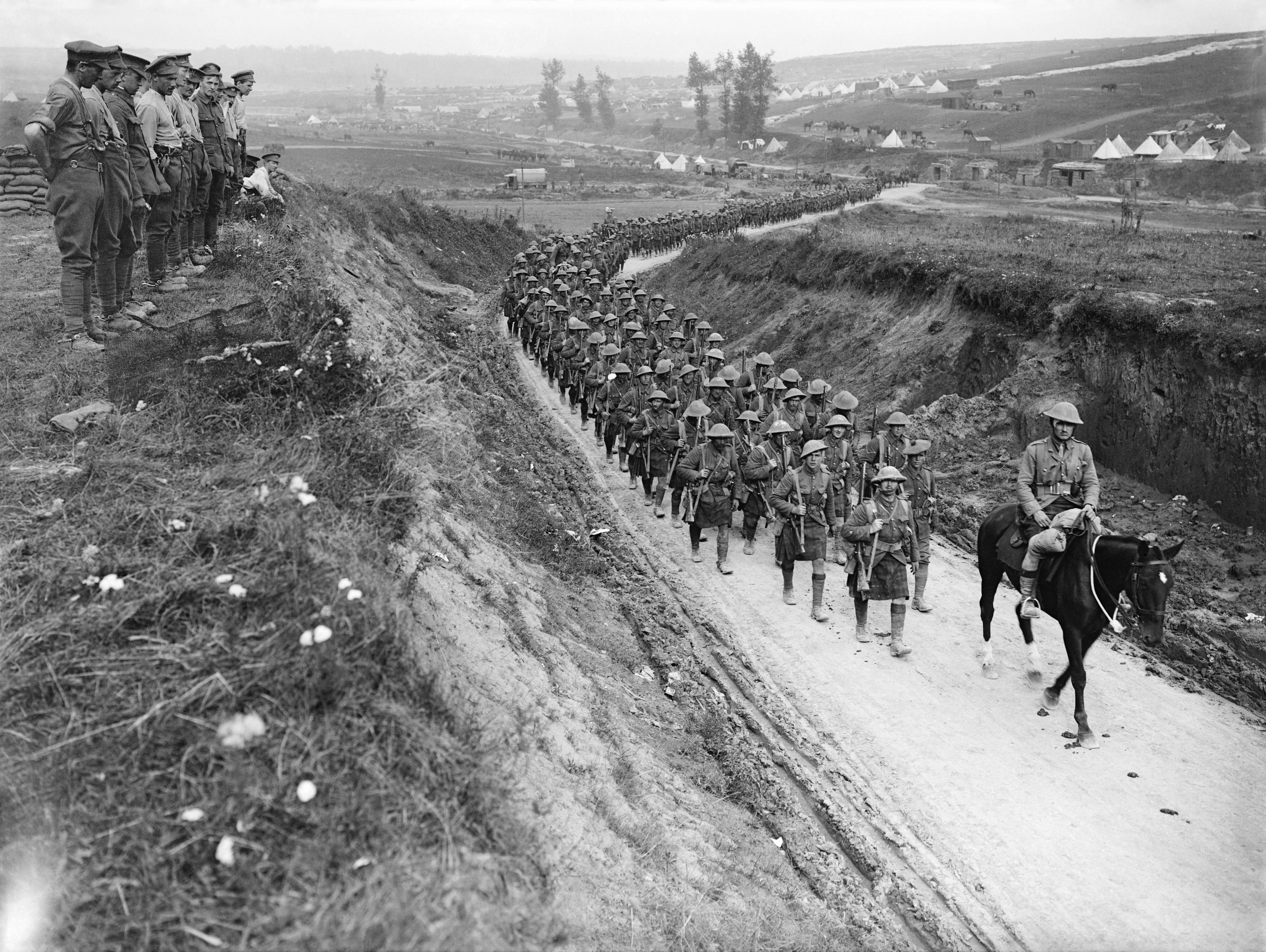
Column of the 2nd Battalion, Gordon Highlanders marching to the trenches along the Becordel–Fricourt road, France, October 1916.

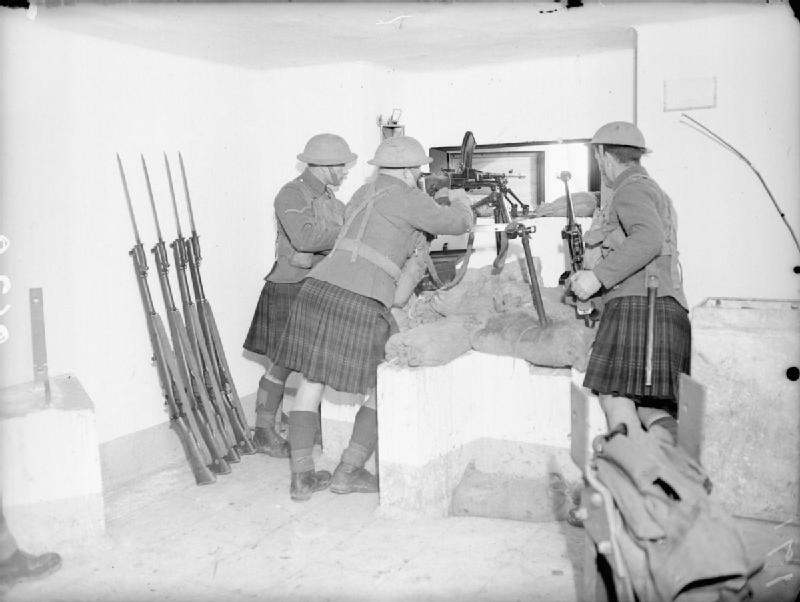
Men of the Queen's Own Cameron Highlanders man a bunker at Aix, France, 1939

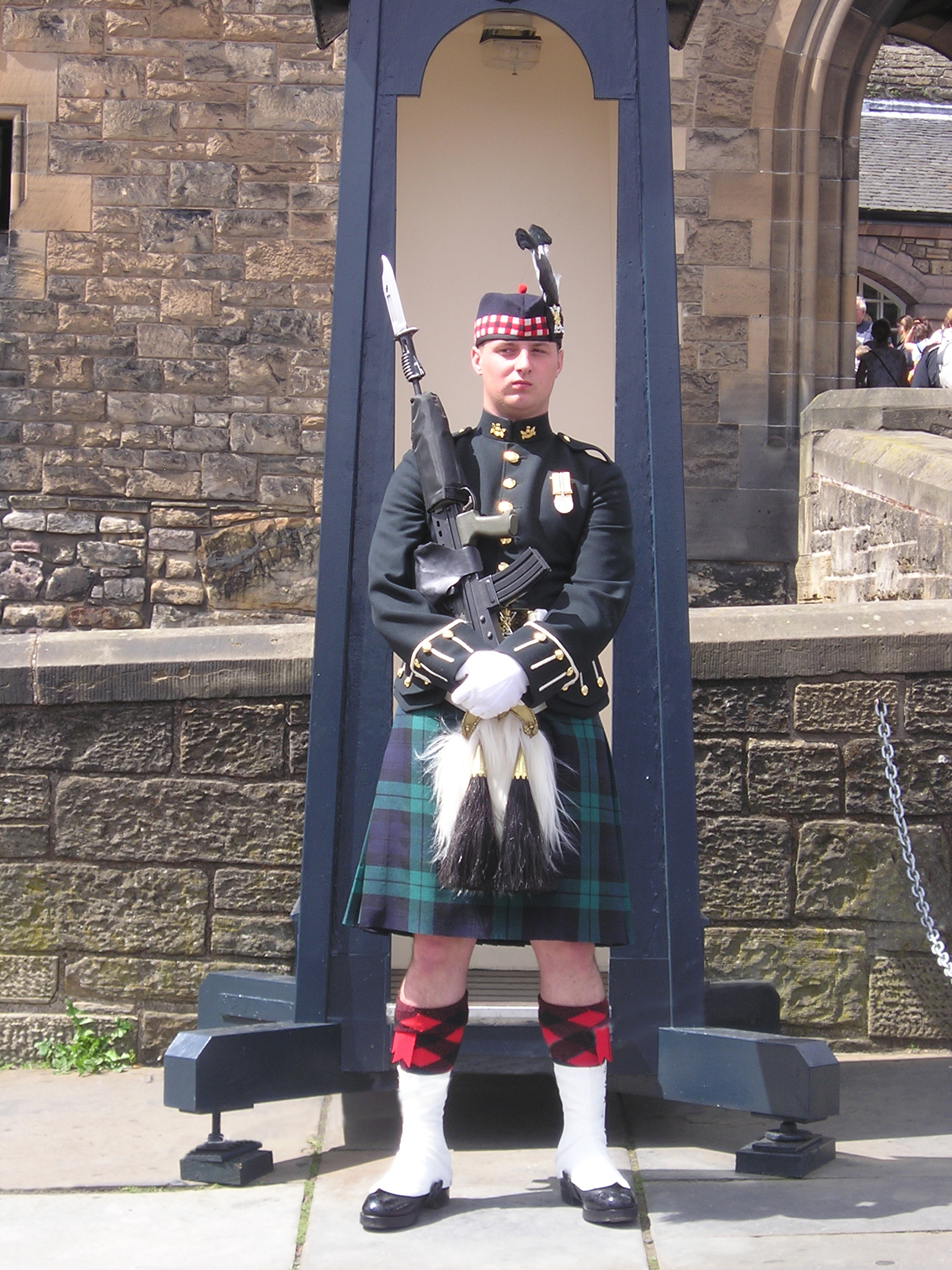
Edinburgh Castle guard of the 4th Battalion, Royal Regiment of Scotland, 2006

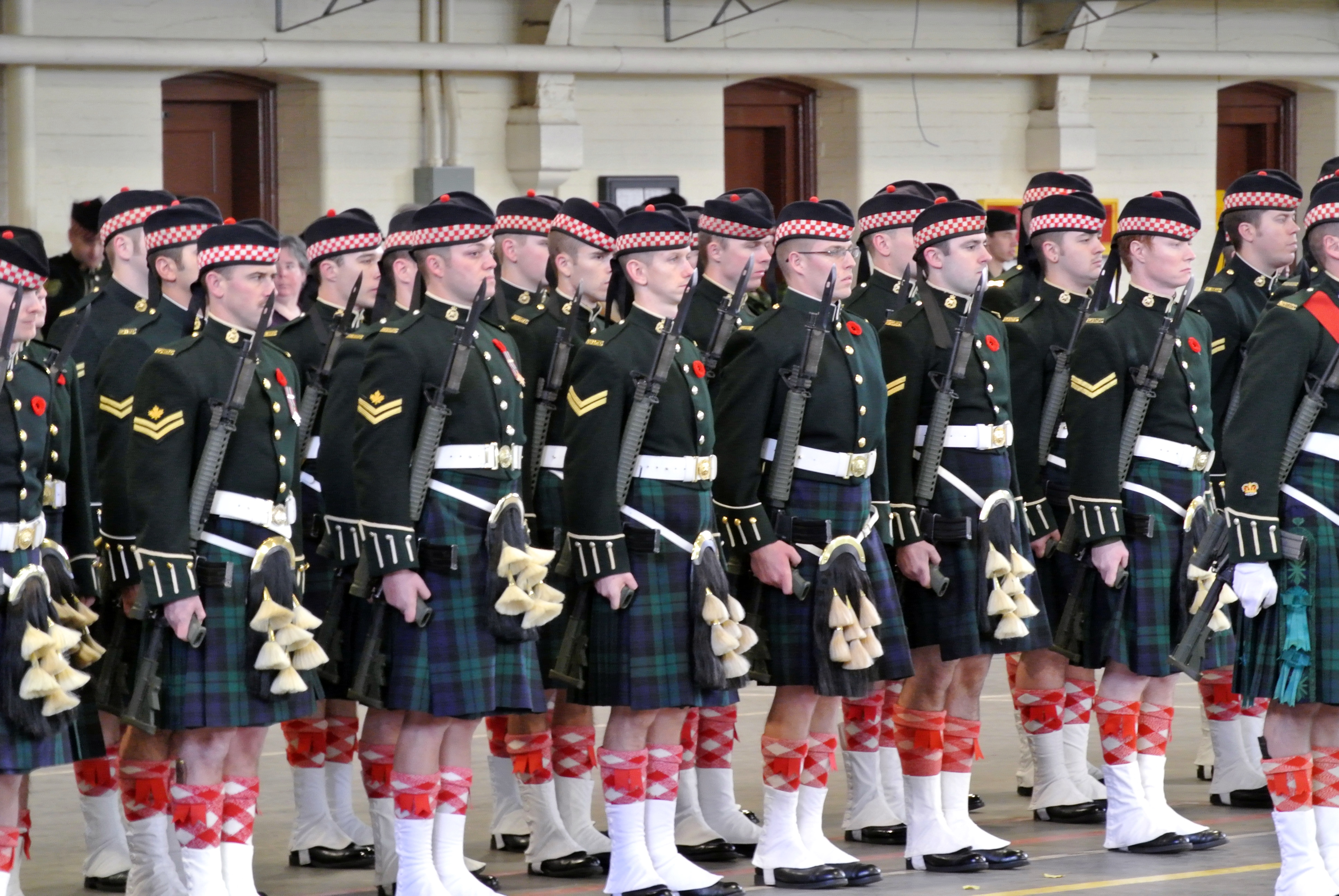
Argyll and Sutherland Highlanders of Canada, 2013
