= Sporran =

Belt pouch traditionally worn with men's Scottish Highland dress

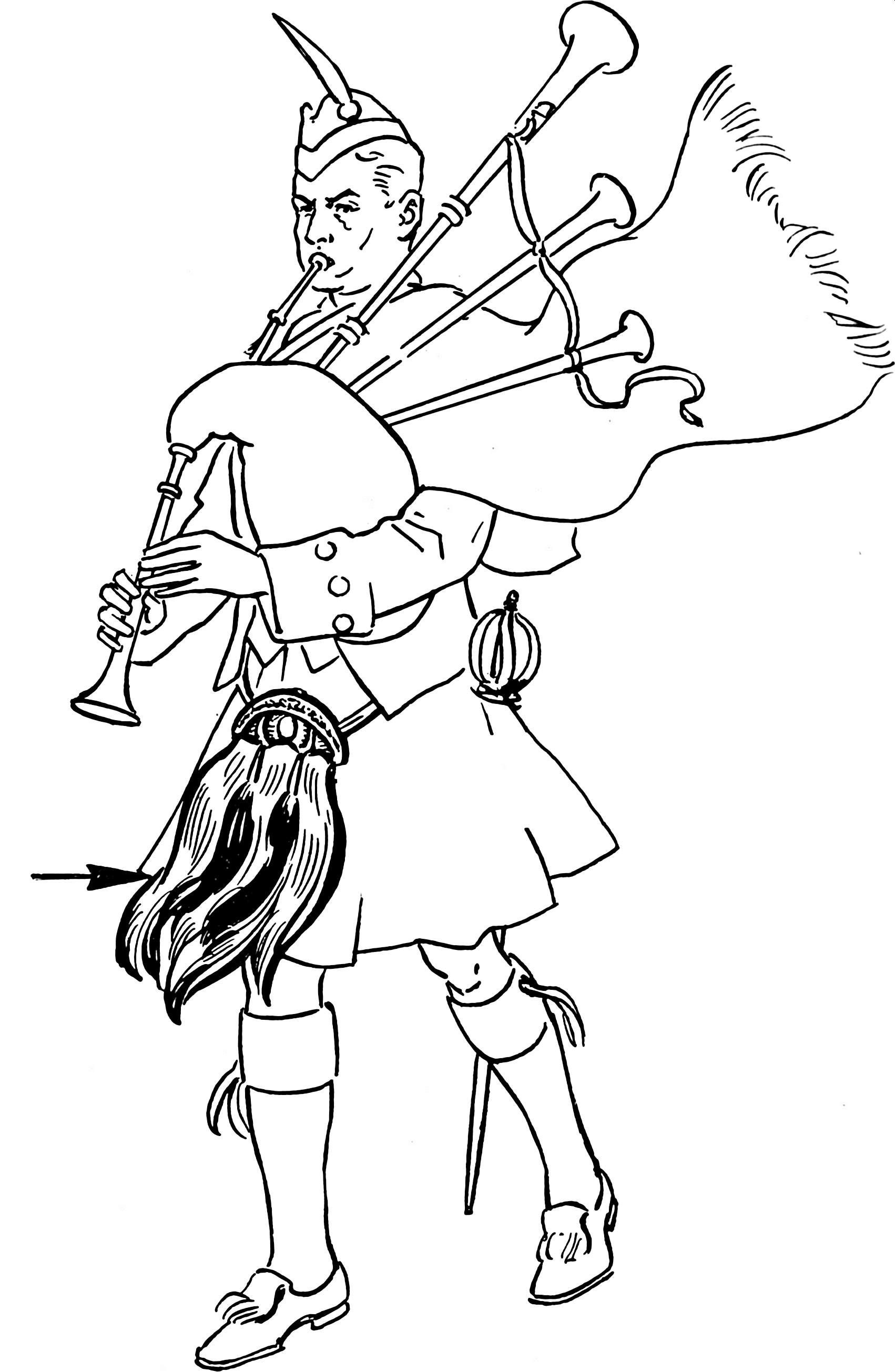
Bagpiper in Highland dress with sporran indicated

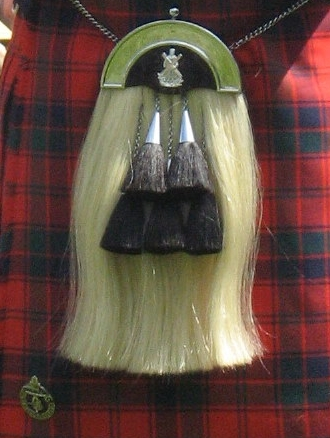
A horsehair sporran

The sporran (/ˈspɒrən/; Scottish Gaelic for 'purse'), a traditional part of male Scottish Highland dress, is a pouch that functions as a pocket for the kilt. Made of leather or fur, the ornamentation of the sporran is chosen to complement the formality of dress worn with it. The sporran is worn on a leather strap or chain, conventionally positioned in front of the groin of the wearer.

Since the traditional kilt does not have pockets, the sporran serves as a wallet and container for any other necessary personal items. It is essentially a remnant of the common European medieval belt-pouch, superseded elsewhere as clothing came to have pockets, but continuing in the Scottish Highlands because of the lack of these accessories in traditional dress. The sporran hangs below the belt buckle; and much effort is made to match their style and design. The kilt belt buckle may be very ornate, and contain similar motifs to the sporran cantle and the sgian dubh. Early sporrans would have been worn suspended from the belt or on either of the hips, rather than hung from a separate strap in front of the wearer.

When driving a car, dancing, playing drums, or engaging in any activity where a heavy pouch might encumber the wearer, the sporran may be turned around the waist to let it hang on the hip in a more casual position.

== Types ==
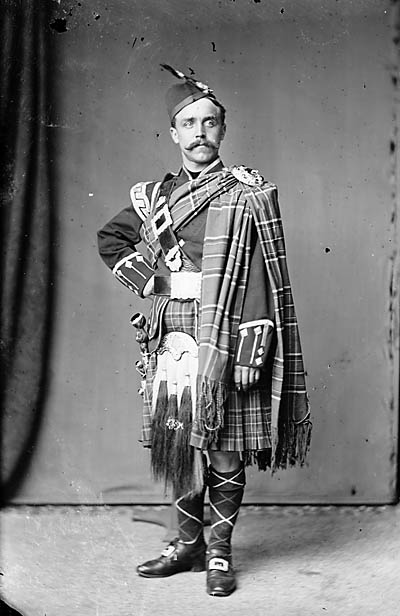
A man wearing tartan, including a large sporran (Russell) NLW3363120

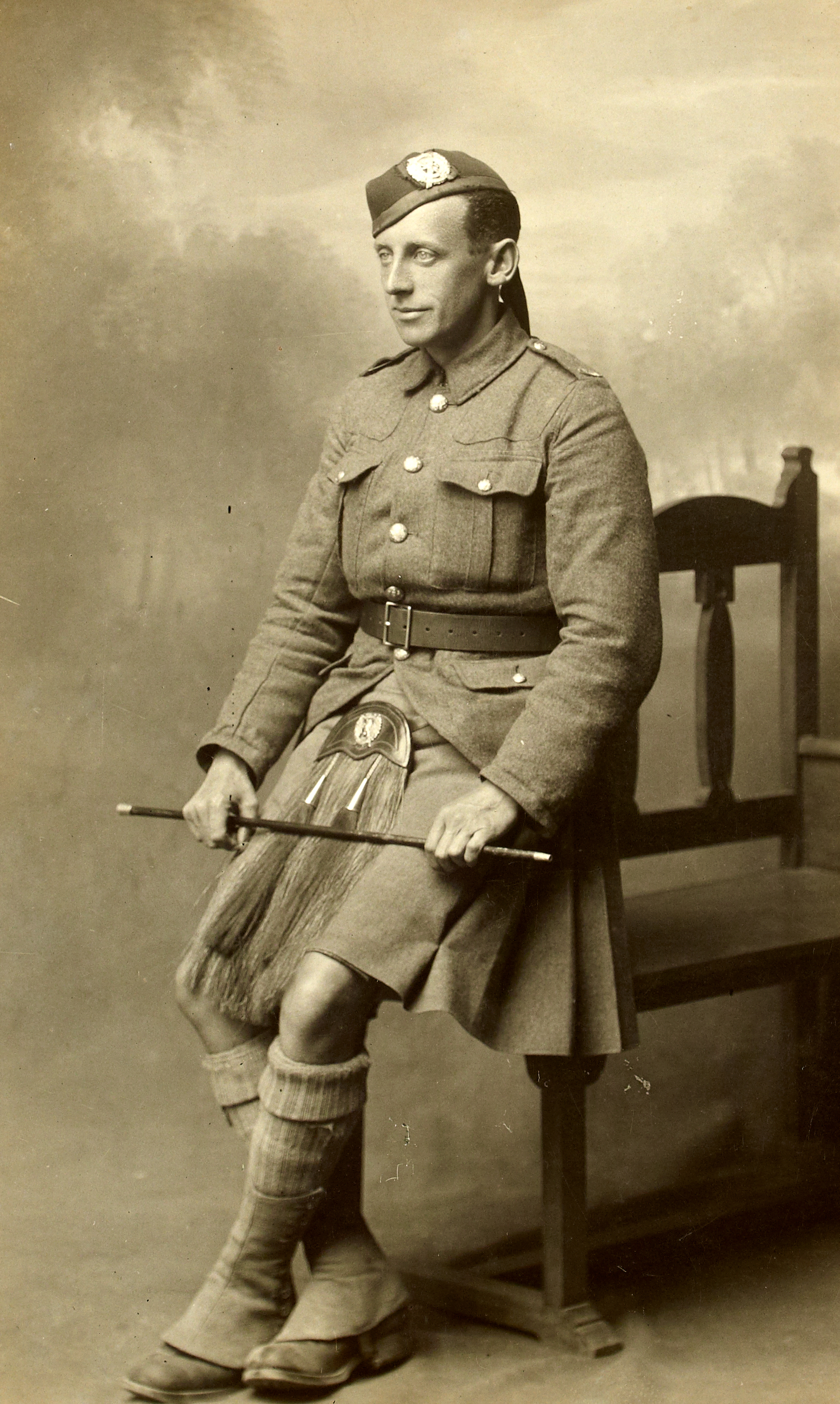
Soldier (likely London Scottish reserve regiment) wearing a two-tassel sporran and a grey kilt [1921]

=== Day sporrans ===
Day sporrans are usually brown leather shovel pouches with simple adornment. These "day" sporrans often have three or more leather tassels and frequently Celtic knot designs carved or embossed into the leather. This style of traditional purse is convenient to use on a daily basis. This style is often made entirely of leather, with a leather flap, front, and three tassels or more. They are often embossed or hand-tooled with Celtic, thistle, or other designs on the flap and body, and fasten with a stud or hook closure.

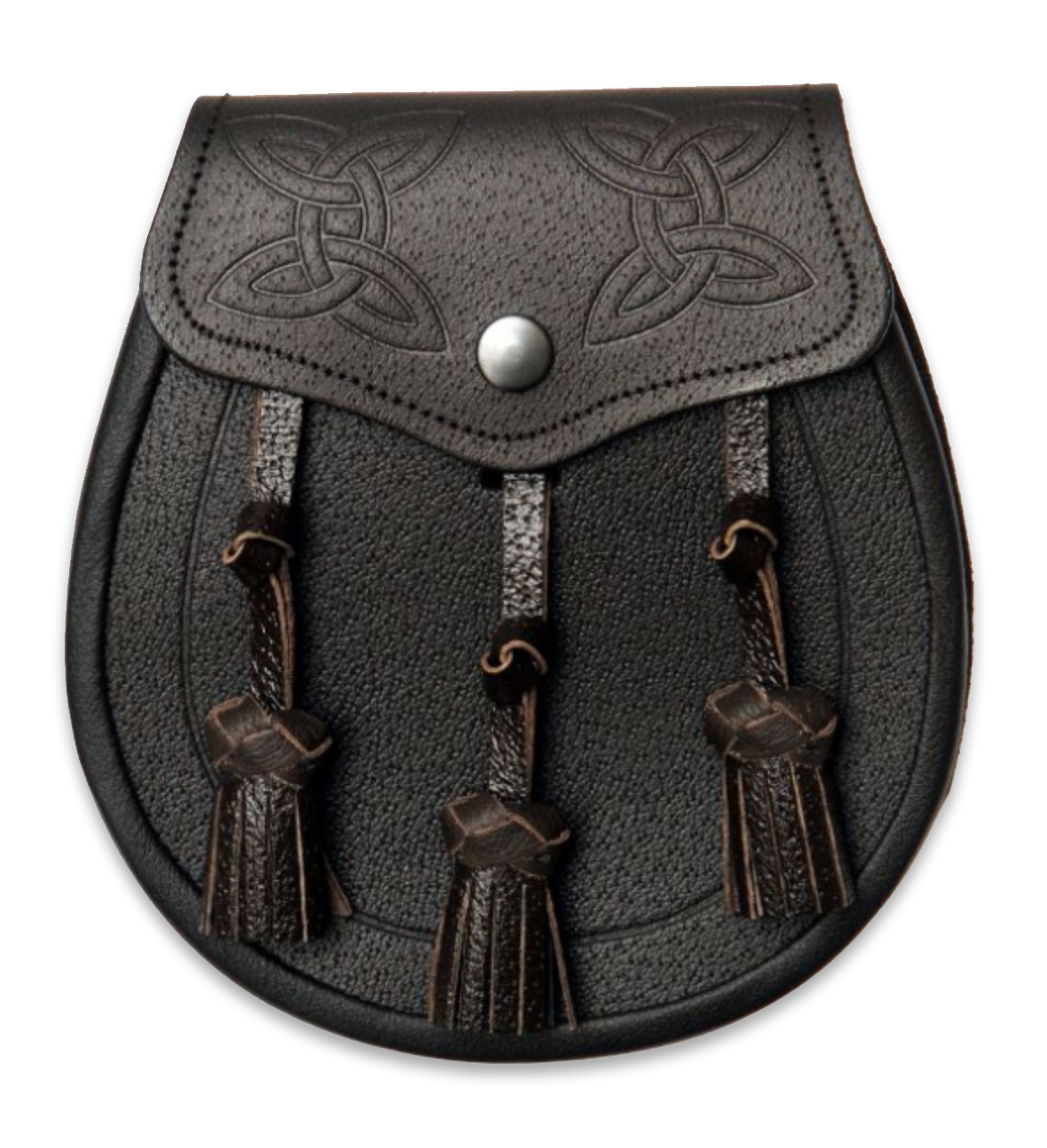
Day sporran

=== Dress sporrans ===
Dress sporrans can be larger than the day variety, and are often highly ornate. Victorian examples were usually quite ostentatious, and much more elaborate than the simple leather pouch of the 17th or 18th century. They may have sterling or silver-plated cantles trimming the top of the pouch and a fur-covered face with fur or hair tassels. The cantle may contain intricate filigree or etchings of Celtic knots. The top of the cantle may have a set stone, jewel, or emblems such as Saint Andrew, a thistle, Clan, or Masonic symbols.

==== Full-dress sporrans ====
This style is regarded as the most formal type of sporran. It is an essential attachment for those who wear kilts in special ceremonies and formal events. It normally contains fur fronts, a fur gusset, 3–6 decorative fur tassels with regular or cross chains, and a metal cantle at the top. The cantle arcs along the top of the pouch and conceals a clasp, ordinarily made from pewter or silver. It might be decorated with Celtic symbols such as the lion rampant, thistle, stag, or Saltire. Some elaborate cantles may include gemstones, such as garnets. This style commonly fastens at the rear with a stud on a small flap that connects the front and rear of the sporran. It allows the wearer to carry a range of items due to the larger size of this sporran.

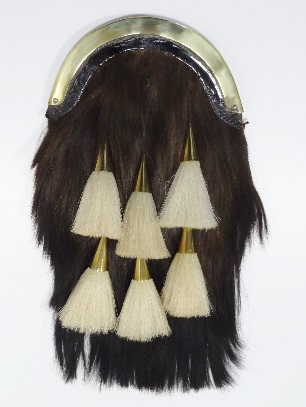
The Argyll and Sutherland Highlanders Regimental full-dress sporran

==== Semi-dress sporrans ====
Semi-dress sporrans combine the same shape and design as the day-wear sporran and a less formal version of the full dress sporran. They are often worn for semi-formal occasions with Argyll outfits. Designs may decorate the leather flap of this style, or a silver clan symbol or other insignia may adorn on the flap. The body fur of this style is normally a hair hide rather than a loftier material reserved for full dress sporrans. The basic figure is commonly included with a fur front, leather gusset, three decorated fur tassels with regular or cross-chains, and a leather flap at the top. Celtic or Scottish designs often are featured on the flap, and may have pewter badges' decoration to raise the design.

==== Full mask sporrans ====
This style is commonly made from the head of an animal such as the badger, otter, fox, Scottish wildcat, pine marten, or other small animals. The animal's head typically forms the front flap of the pouch, and the body of the pouch is made from the same pelt. This style displays the Scottish tradition, since the earliest pouches probably included the head with the pelt. Today, people do not wear this style very often for standard formal occasions, though it may be worn in historic re-enactments and festivals as a costume accessory.

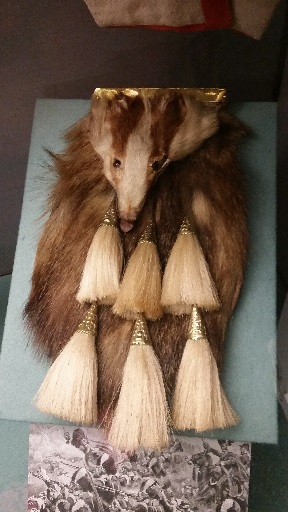
Badger-head sporran on display in The Argyll and Sutherland Highlanders Regimental Museum

==== Horsehair sporrans ====
This style is most commonly worn as part of regimental attire for the pipers or the drummers. In general, it is one of the most dramatic and biggest of dress-sporrans with a very formal style. A traditional horsehair pouch extends just below the belt to just below the hem of the kilt. The most ordinary pattern contains black horsehair tassels on a white horsehair background. Pewter or silver cantle is also carved on the sporran. This style made from horsehide rather than tail hair, are more able to keep with the compact shape and decor of less showy, semi-dress versions.

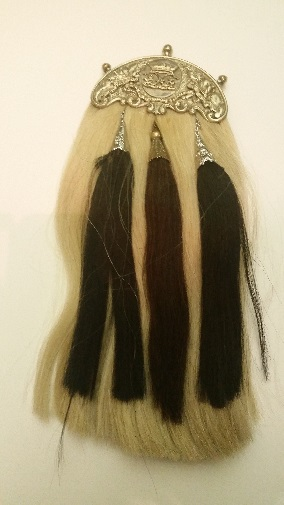
Horsehair sporran on display in The Argyll and Sutherland Highlanders Regimental Museum

== Materials and law ==
As sporrans are typically made of animal skin, their production, ownership, and transportation across borders may be regulated by legislation set to control the trade of protected and endangered species. A 2007 BBC report on legislation introduced by the Scottish Executive stated that sporran owners may need licences to prove that the animals used in construction of their pouch conformed to these regulations.

In 2009, European politicians voted to ban the sale of seal products putting an end to the use of seal in sporran production.

== Tradition in Argyll and Sutherland Highlanders Regiment ==
=== Tradition ===
Soldiers did not wear sporrans very often in daily life. The main function of sporrans were used as haversack, for each Highlander carried his own provision of oatmeal—eating it if necessary, raw, or mixed with a little cold water—as did Montrose in the dawn before the Battle of Inverlochy. To have enough comfort for a soldier to be able to walk, the sporran usually would be worn as high as possible. Soldiers normally could get a sporran from the regimental office free of charge, as long as they gave it back when they left the Regiment. However, some officers and sergeants had to pay and book their own unique styles of sporrans. That sporran was their private property, no matter if they still stayed and served in the Regiments.

For most highlander regiments, they used different number of tassels to distinguish their own unique symbol. For example, The Argyll and Sutherland Highlanders regiment used six tassels on sporrans to differ with other highlanders' regiments. The general rules for six tassels are: two at the top in a line, two under them in a line, and two in the centre to hang below these, so that a line drawn across the bottom of the side tassels would pass through the centre of the centre tassels. The sporran-belt when on the man is to be cut to three inches from the buckle, and to be cut to a point in the shoemaker's shop—it is not to be doubled into the keeper; one keeper will be sufficient—and the point of strap will be in the direction of the right hip, and the buckle will be worn exactly over the spine and not to one side.

The tradition of wearing sporran in the Argyll and Sutherland Highlanders Regiment is a bit different from the daily wearing of other highlanders. The official description of the dress sporran is "engraved gilt top, five sided, square edges, with centre in black enamel. On the centre, Boar's head and scroll. Princess' Coronet on top with her Cypher, the cat and scroll similar to full dress headdress. Six small gold bullion tassels."

Here are the dress regulations to indicate; the dress sporran was not to exceed eleven inches in length, and the badger-skin sporran no more than thirteen inches. The dress sporran was not to have more than six tassels. Officers were permitted to wear undress sporran resembling the men's. Goatskins with silver tassels were differed as the style of the officers' sporran with other ranks. The knobs (i.e. the bells) on the tassels of the officer's purse were ordered to the gilt. The rank-and-file purse was of black hair with white tassels, and was still larger and broader than formerly.

=== Typical types ===
In terms of historic records, there are six different types of sporran which were used in the regimental events. The Badger-head sporrans were typically used by the officers and sergeants. The horsehair sporrans were widely used in different ranks. The swinging six sporrans were extremely popular for the soldiers.

Badger-head sporran typically forms as the front flap of the pouch, and the body of the pouch is made from the same pelt. From the year 1800, the badger skin probably was a widely used material for sporrans and became a new fashion trend for the officers and sergeants as in most Highland corps, opening in front, with a straight narrow silver or brass top, edged with crimson leather, two rows of small white tassels and silver bells, mounted on red leather and suspended by twisted white leather thongs or cords. In ordinary occasions, officers and sergeants started to wear a sporran of badger skin with the head and narrow brass curved top, edged with black leather, and six white tassels in brass cups.

The rank and file wore similar ones of black or grey goatskin, but the white tassels had red cords. The sporran had a white buff leather strap and was somewhat smaller and squarer than the modern pattern. It was worn in the old fashion, well braced up, close to the jacket. These sporrans, unlike the present day ones, had a large roomy pouch, the opening being concealed by the flat top.

Horsehair sporran was normally worn by pipers and drummers of the Regimental music band. The most ordinary pattern contains black horsehair tassels on a white horsehair background. Pewter or silver cantle is also carved on the sporran. Sometimes, the pattern thistle decorated cantle and tassel tops. It's widely distinguished as the most popular pattern of an officer's sporran with white horsehair background, and normal soldier's with black horsehair background.

Swinging six sporran is generally known as a "swinging six" due to the six white horse hair tassels which hang from the front of the sporran, made of black goatskin. Behind the brass cantle is a leather purse to keep money or personal items in. The style of sporran was adopted as part of the Sutherland Highlanders' uniform between 1823 and 1826 and was later worn as part of the uniform of the Argyll and Sutherland Highlanders Regiment after the 93rd and 91st amalgamated in 1881. This type of sporran was commonly worn by the sergeants and soldiers.

White sporran was issued as a buff coloured leather sporran that had to be coated in a white liquid which dried to form a white surface (This often rubbed off onto the front of the kilt). A regimental sporran badge was then attached to the front. This style was only worn on limited occasions and did not replace the swinging six sporrans or the other plain leather one, both of which continued to be worn throughout this period. Most soldiers were happy when the white sporran was no longer issued as part of the uniform of the Argyll and Sutherland Highlanders.

Civilian sporran worn by General Duncan Campbell of Lochnell. The sporran has a silver cantle, a border decorated with thistle foliage, and a central coat of arms of the Campbell of Lochnell family; six silver thread tassels; and, a white goat hair covering on a white/light tan leather sporran edged in black leather.

Plain leather sporran has become very popular today, as it is convenient to wear daily. This style concentrates on practical function more than aesthetic value, it only keeps the Regimental badge without six tassels and another decorative pattern. This style is an essential accessory for the kilt to hold money, keys, etc.

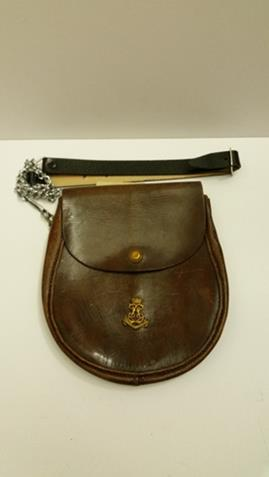
Lieutenant Colonel's sporran, belongs to The Argyll and Sutherland Highlanders Regimental Museum

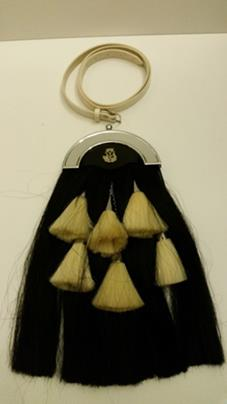
Soldier's sporran, belongs to the Argyll and Sutherland Highlanders Regimental Museum

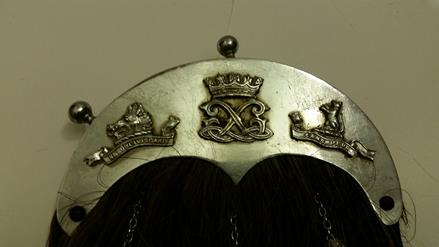
Boar's head and scroll. Princess’ Coronet, belongs to The Argyll and Sutherland Highlanders Regimental Museum

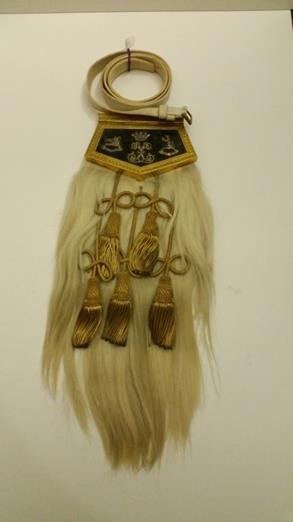
Scottish Highlanders Regimental Officer's sporran, belongs to The Argyll and Sutherland Highlanders Regimental Museum

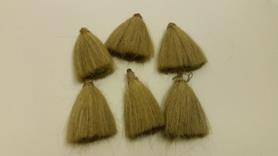
Six white horse hair tassels, belong to The Argyll and Sutherland Highlanders Regimental Museum

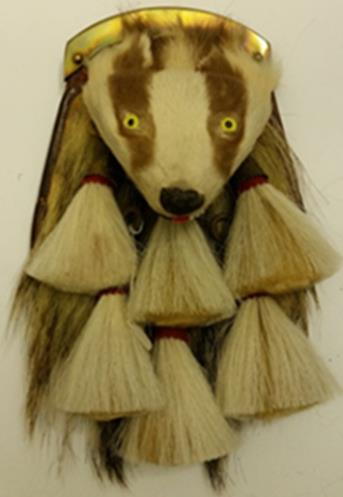
Captain's sporran, belongs to The Argyll and Sutherland Highlanders Regimental Museum

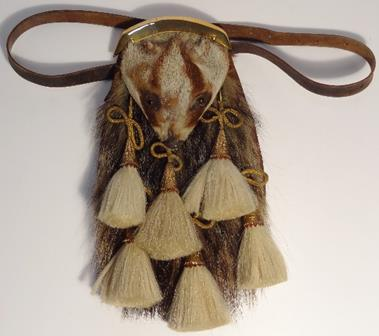
Major's sporran, 8th Bn, belongs to The Argyll and Sutherland Highlanders Regimental Museum

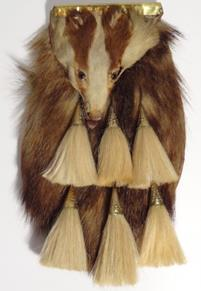
Sergeant's sporran, belongs to The Argyll and Sutherland Highlanders Regimental Museum

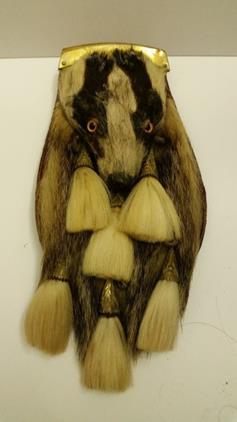
Sergeant's sporran, belongs to The Argyll and Sutherland Highlanders Regimental Museum

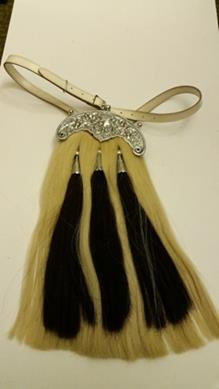
Piper major's sporran, belongs to The Argyll and Sutherland Highlanders Regimental Museum

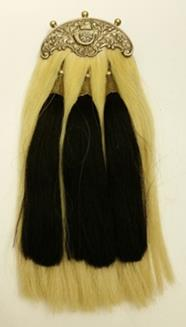
Piper major's sporran, belongs to The Argyll and Sutherland Highlanders Regimental Museum

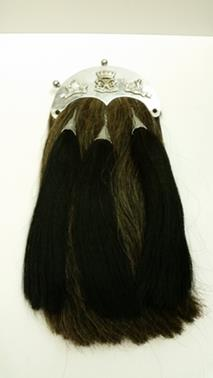
Piper's sporran, belongs to The Argyll and Sutherland Highlanders Regimental Museum

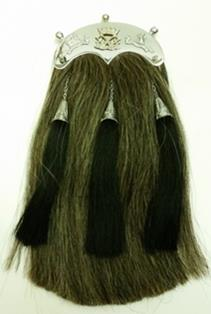
Piper's sporran, belongs to The Argyll and Sutherland Highlanders Regimental Museum

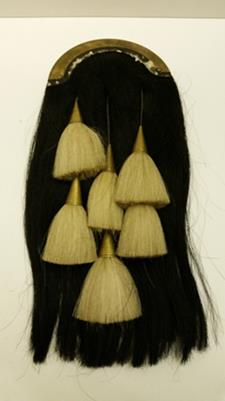
Sergeants’ sporran, belongs to The Argyll and Sutherland Highlanders Regimental Museum

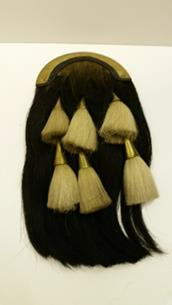
Sergeants’ sporran, belongs to The Argyll and Sutherland Highlanders Regimental Museum

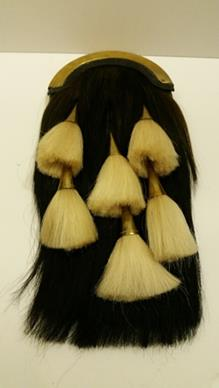
Soldiers’ sporran, belongs to The Argyll and Sutherland Highlanders Regimental Museum

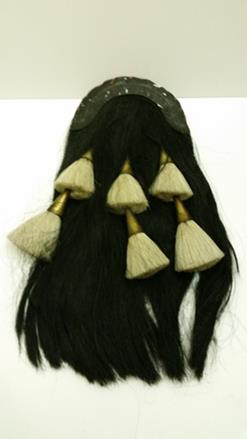
Soldiers’ sporran, belongs to The Argyll and Sutherland Highlanders Regimental Museum

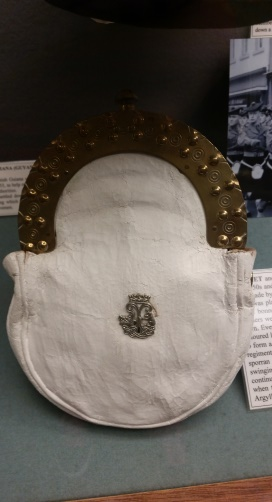
White day-wear sporran, belongs to The Argyll and Sutherland Highlanders Regimental Museum

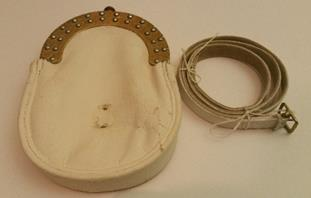
White day-wear sporran, belongs to The Argyll and Sutherland Highlanders Regimental Museum

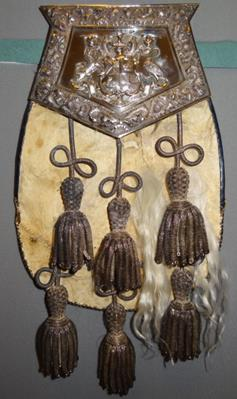
Civilian sporran worn by General Duncan Campbell of Lochnell. The sporran has a silver cantle, a border decorated with thistle foliage, and a central coat of arms of the Campbell of Lochnell family; six silver thread tassels; and, a white goat hair covering on a white/light tan leather sporran edged in black leather, belongs to The Argyll and Sutherland Highlanders Regimental Museum

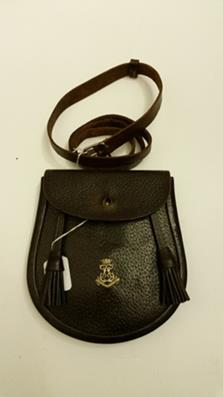
Captain's sporran, belongs to The Argyll and Sutherland Highlanders Regimental Museum

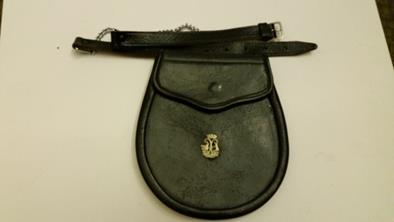
Sergeant's sporran, belongs to The Argyll and Sutherland Highlanders Regimental Museum

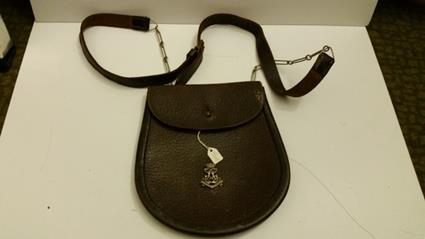
Second Lieutenant's sporran, belongs to The Argyll and Sutherland Highlanders Regimental Museum

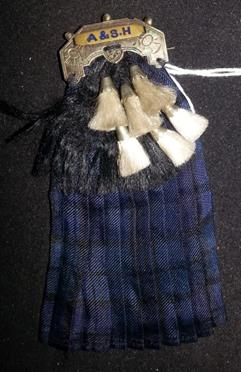
Argyll&Suntherland Highlanders' sweetheart brooch in the shape of a sporran belonging to S/4392 Pte Alexander McIntyre, World War 1, belongs to The Argyll and Sutherland Highlanders Regimental Museum

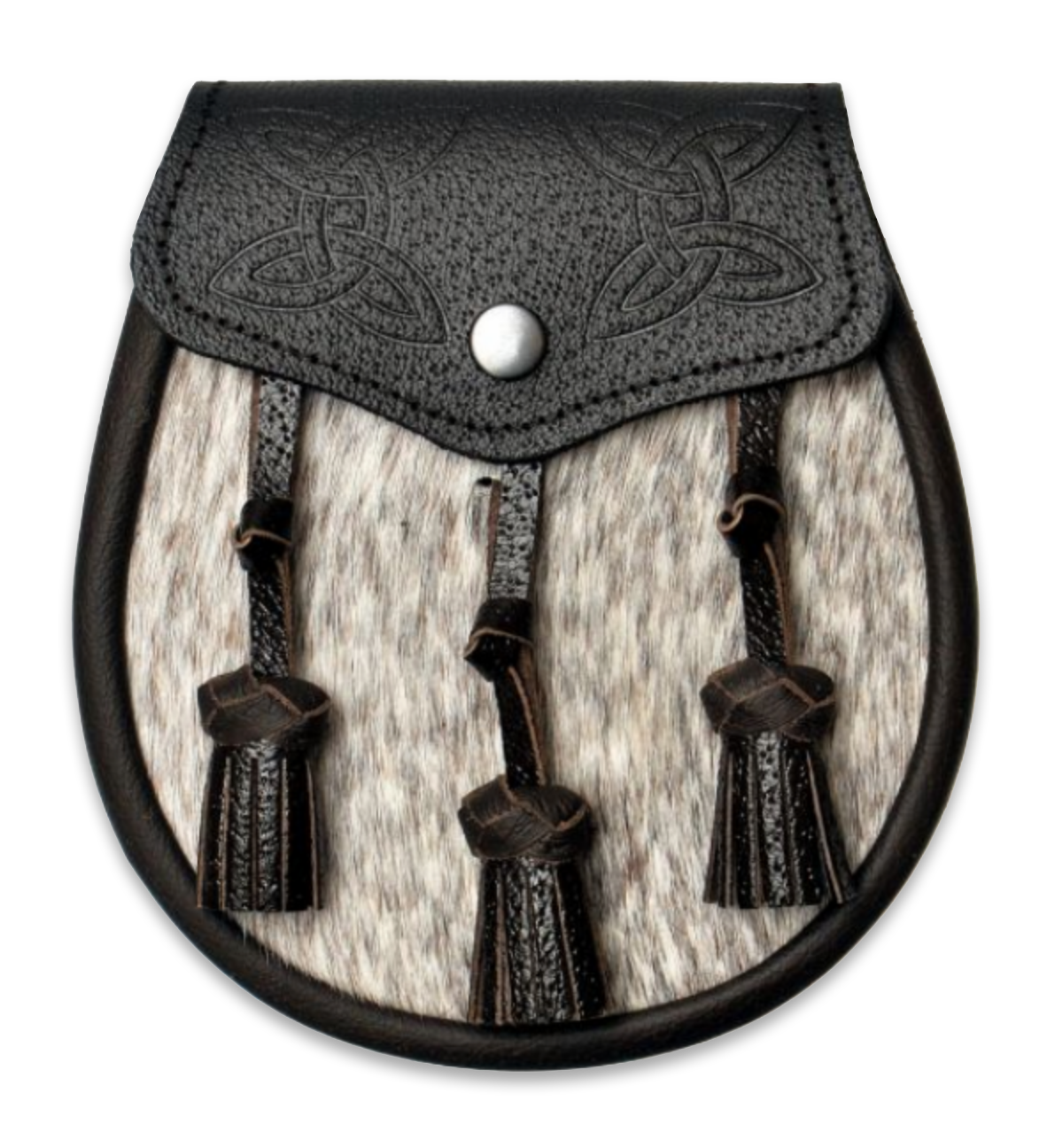
Semi-dress sporran
