= David Graeme (British Army officer) =

British Army general

David Graeme (2 February 1716 – 19 January 1797) was a British officer in the Scots Brigade, diplomat and courtier, responsible for carrying George III's proposal of marriage to Charlotte of Mecklenburg-Strelitz.

== Origins and estate ==
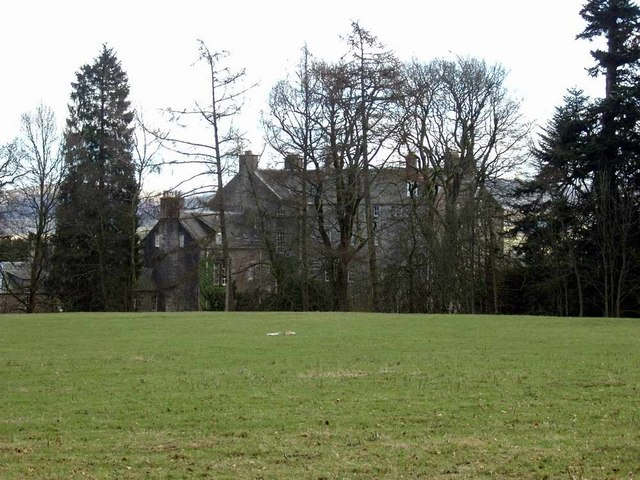
Braco Castle

Graeme was the son of James Graeme of Braco and Catherine Stirling, the daughter of Sir William Stirling of Ardoch. His parents were both Jacobite sympathisers, but he himself played no part in the 1745 uprising.

He inherited Braco Castle on the death of his father in 1736 and subsequently inherited also the barony of Gorthie, in Perthshire, on the death of his cousin, Mungo Graeme. The expenses inherent in his way of life necessitated the sale of Gorthie after his death.

== Military career ==
He served in the Jacobite Scots brigade in the Dutch Republic and the Austrian Netherlands under W.P. Colyear, being promoted to captain in 1745, and to lieutenant-colonel in 1752. Serving under Alexander Marjoribanks he stayed at Loevestein Castle between 1750-1754 where there is a fresco by Robert Gordon depicting Lord George Murray (general), his wife, son and a bagpiper. In 1758, he was appointed as a contractor supplying British troops in Germany during the Seven Years' War. In 1760/1, he raised the 105th Regiment of Foot (Queen's Own Royal Regiment of Highlanders) for the British army, taking the rank of colonel, until it was disbanded in 1763. Having been promoted to major-general in 1762, he was appointed colonel of the 49th (Hertfordshire) Regiment of Foot from 1764 to 1768 and colonel of the 19th (The 1st Yorkshire North Riding) Regiment of Foot. He was promoted to lieutenant-general in 1772 and general in 1783.

== Diplomat and courtier ==
Contrary to the report of Horace Walpole, Graeme was not sent by Lord Bute on a tour of German courts in order to report on the rival attractions of a number of Protestant princesses. However, in 1761 he was sent to Mecklenburg-Strelitz to carry George III's proposal of marriage to Princess Sophia Charlotte. Thereafter he was Secretary to the Queen between 1761 and 1764 and Comptroller of the Queen's Household between 1765 and 1774. Between 1764 and 1773, he was also Member of Parliament (MP) for Perthshire. David Graeme was co-owner of the sugar plantation Montrose in the Parish of St. John on the Island of Grenada from c.1780 onwards.

For his services to Queen Charlotte between 1761 and 1774, Graeme was appointed, in ca. 1788, Master of St. Katherine's Hospital, a peculiar and exempt jurisdiction in the patronage and gift of the Queen Consort. This was a charitable institution, a hospice for the needy and infirm founded in the twelfth century, attached to the collegiate church of St. Katherine the Virgin and Martyr. By the eighteenth century, its main activities appear to have been supporting a school for the education of poor children and almshouses for retired sailors. It still collected income from various ancient rights, including the right of issuing marriage licences as well as grants of probate and administration. The Master was provided with a house and a modest stipend. The hospital was just outside the Tower of London, on the south-east, until 1825 when it was removed to Regent's Park and the church was demolished to make way for the construction of the eponymous dock.

== Family and descendants ==
General Graeme married Miss Hepburn (daughter of James Conglaton Hepburn of Keith, in Haddingtonshire, and Catherine Riccard of Rickarton). They had an only child Catherine; she married on 13 June 1768 the son and heir of Viscount Hampden.

He died at his house in George Street, Edinburgh.

Parliament of Great Britain
Preceded by John Murray	Member of Parliament for Perthshire; 1764–1773	Succeeded by James Murray
Military offices
Preceded by Lord George Beauclerk	Colonel of the 19th (The 1st Yorkshire North Riding) Regiment of Foot; 1768–1797	Succeeded by Samuel Hulse
Preceded by John Stanwix	Colonel of the 49th Regiment of Foot; 1764–1768	Succeeded by Sir Alexander Maitland, 1st Baronet
