= Portrait of William Gordon =

Painting by Pompeo Batoni

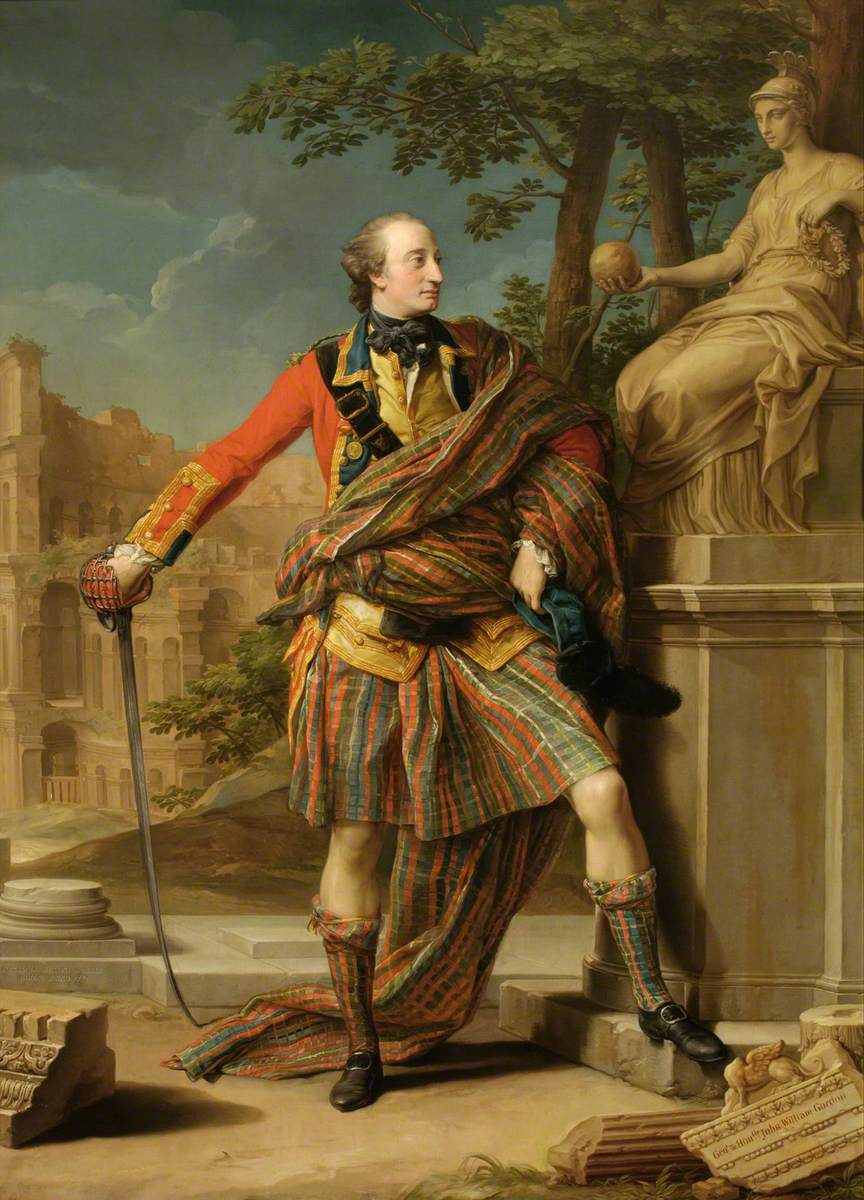
- Artist: Pompeo Batoni
- Year: 1766
- Type: Oil on canvas, portrait painting
- Dimensions: 289.5 cm × 217 cm (114.0 in × 85 in)
- Location: Fyvie Castle; Aberdeenshire

Portrait of William Gordon is a 1766 portrait painting by the Italian artist Pompeo Batoni. It depicts the Scottish soldier Colonel William Gordon. Gordon was on his Grand Tour when he sat to Batoni in Rome. He is shown wearing the uniform of the 105th Foot, a Highland regiment of the British Army which he had commanded during the Seven Years' War. Distinctly Neoclassical in tone, the Huntly Tartan plaids resemble those of a Roman toga. A statue of Roma and the ruins of the Colosseum in the background reinforces this association. Gordon likely chose to be depicted in Highland costume, at a time when it was still had lingering association with Jacobite sympathies. James Boswell saw the painting in Batoni's studio during his visit to Rome.

The painting is in the collection of Fyvie Castle in Aberdeenshire, controlled by the National Trust for Scotland.

== Bibliography ==
- Black, Jeremy. Italy and the Grand Tour. Yale University Press, 2003.
- Bowron, Edgar Peters & Kerber, Peter Björn. Pompeo Batoni: Prince of Painters in Eighteenth-century Rome. Yale University Press, 2007.
- Coltman, Viccy. Art and Identity in Scotland: A Cultural History from the Jacobite Rising of 1745 to Walter Scott. Cambridge University Press, 2019.
