= Queen's Own Royal Regiment of Highlanders =

Defunct British infantry regiment

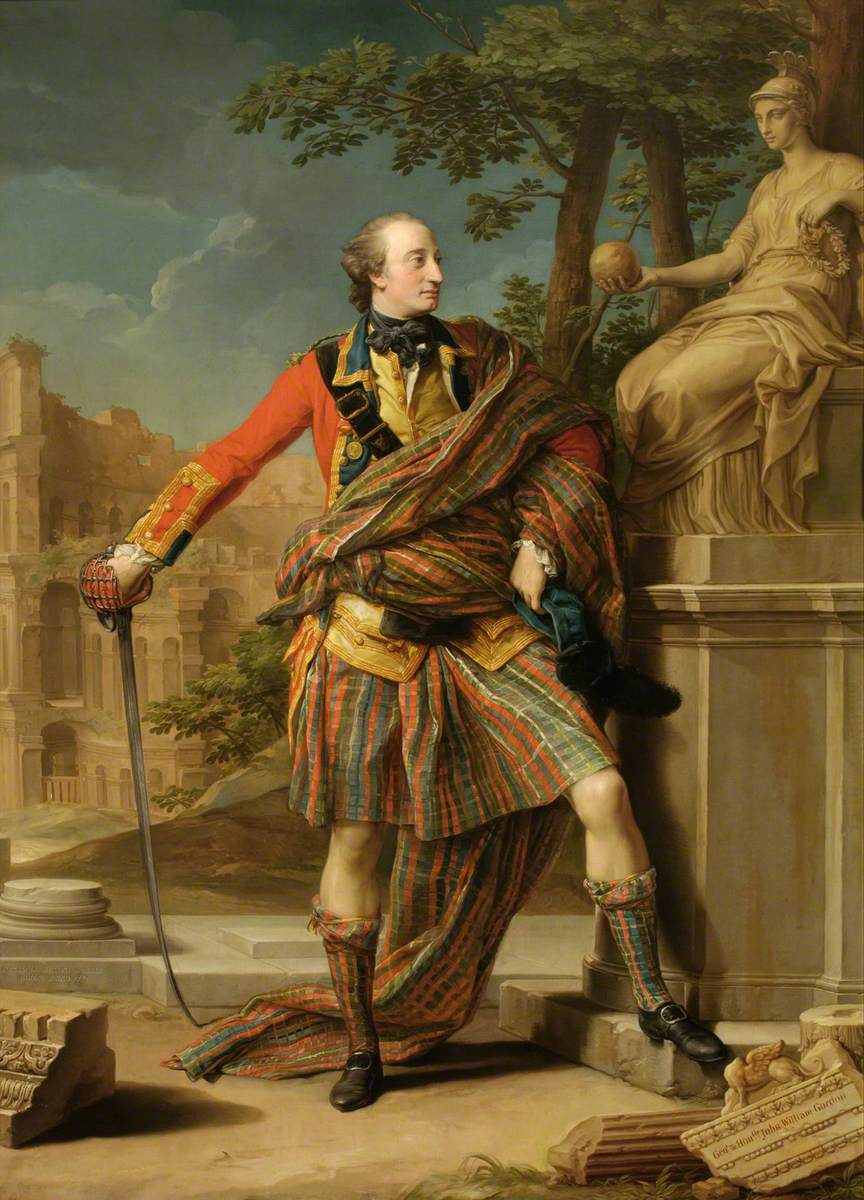
General William Gordon, shown wearing the uniform of the 105th Regiment in Portrait of William Gordon by Pompeo Batoni. Actually, when the painting was made (1765–66), the regiment had already been disbanded; Gordon, then on half-pay, evidently kept the uniform and had it with him when visiting Rome, where he met Batoni.

The 105th Regiment of Foot (Queen's Own Royal Regiment of Highlanders) was a short-lived British line infantry regiment. It was raised in Perthshire by Major-General David Graeme as a two-battalion regiment on 15 October 1760 by converting independent companies. It was named after Charlotte of Mecklenburg-Strelitz, who had been selected as the wife for the future George III of Great Britain. The regiment served in Ireland and was disbanded in 1763.
