= Smoggie =

Demonym for people from Teesside, Northern England

- Teesside English
- Native to: England
- Region: Teesside
- Ethnicity: English
- Language family: Indo-European: Germanic; West Germanic; North Sea Germanic; Anglo-Frisian; Anglic; Anglian; North Anglic; Northern English; Northumbrian; Smoggie
- Early forms: Old English: Middle English

Language codes
- ISO 639-3: –

Smoggie is a colloquial term used to refer to people from the Teesside area of North East England. The term is also used to describe the local accent and dialect spoken in the area. The term relates to the area's notoriety for its high levels of pollution from local industry, which resulted in a thick smog that often blanketed the region. Despite popular belief that the term originates from the 1960s, its earliest recorded use is in the 1990s, as visiting football supporters from other areas of the country began to refer to the locals as "smog monsters", which was later shortened to "smoggies". Despite its origins as a term of derision, "Smoggie" has since been adopted as a term of pride by many residents of Teesside.

== History ==
Originally, this was a term of abuse for supporters of Middlesbrough F.C. coined by their Sunderland A.F.C. counterparts. The name was meant to refer to the heavy air pollution once produced by the local petrochemical industry, and from Dorman Long. Though, at first, Smoggie was used as a pejorative term, it has become an example of reappropriation with many people now proudly calling themselves 'Smoggies'.

== Current usage ==
Primarily directed at people from Teesside, 'Smoggies' is often used to describe the areas of Teesside with a noticeable amount of industry. The term was referred to by Middlesbrough South and East Cleveland MP, Tom Blenkinsop, in the House of Commons, and was recorded in Hansard, in July 2011. Smoggies has occasional use as a nickname for Middlesbrough F.C. In 2013 the Cleveland Art Society organised a major exhibition of the works of local artists entitled Smoggies Allowed in an Art Gallery.

== Characteristics ==
Due to the rapid growth of Teesside in the 19th century, Smoggie represents an example of new dialect formation and was influenced by Northumbrian, Yorkshire and Hiberno-English. Despite its mixed origins, it is considered part of the urban North East dialect area, forming the 'Southern Urban North-Eastern English' dialect region including Hartlepool and Darlington.

=== Phonology ===
- Like most North East dialects, the definite article is always full and never reduced to t' as in the Yorkshire dialect.
- Final unstressed /i/ is a tense [i] rather than a lax [ɪ]. This mirrors other North Eastern dialects and contrasts with Yorkshire English.
- H-dropping is common in informal speech. This is considered unusual among most North East dialects but is shared with Mackem.
- /l/ is typically more velarised than in other North East dialects.
- Square–nurse merger: the vowel in word, heard, nurse, etc. is pronounced in the same way as in square, dare for many speakers. This is [ɛː]. This causes pairs such as fair and fur, bared and bird, where and were to become homophones.
- The phoneme /aɪ/ (as in prize) may become a monophthong [ɑː] before a voiced consonant. For example, five becomes [fɑːv] (fahve), prize becomes [pʰɹɑːz] (prahze). This does not occur before voiceless consonants, so "price" is [pʰɹaɪs].
- The FACE vowel is typically [eː], or sometimes more rarely [ɪə] or [ɜː].
- The GOOSE vowel is typically [ɪʉ] or [ʉː].
- The START vowel is typically more fronted than in upper North East varieties, thus park is typically pronounced [paːk].
- In conservative forms of the dialect make and take are pronounced mek and tek ([ˈmɛk] and [ˈtɛk]). These contrast with the Sunderland and Durham variants mak and tak but are counterintuitively shared with broad Geordie.

=== Vocabulary ===
- Smoggie is characterised by a relative lack of Northumbrianisms in comparison to Geordie, Mackem, and Pitmatic (upper North East dialects). Markedly North-Eastern forms such as divvent or dinnet for "don't" and gan for "go" are not found on Teesside.
  - However, a limited number of Northumbrian words are still found in the dialect, such as bairn and canny.
- The emphatic interjection well aye corresponds to the upper North East whey aye or Scots och aye.
- ’oway or ’owee corresponds to Geordie howay or Mackem haway. On Teesside the h is always dropped.

== See also ==
- Mackem
- Monkey hanger

== Bibliography ==
- Williams, Ann; Kerswill, Paul (1999). "Dialect levelling: change and continuity in Milton Keynes, Reading and Hull" (PDF). In Foulkes, Paul; Docherty, Gerard (eds.). Urban voices. Accent studies in the British Isles. London: Arnold. pp. 141–162. Archived from the original (PDF) on 16 September 2012.
