= Pitmatic =

Dialects spoken in former mining areas of Northumberland and Durham

- Pronunciation: /pɪtˈmatɪk/
- Region: Great Northern Coalfield
- Language family: Indo-European: Germanic; West Germanic; Ingvaeonic; Anglo-Frisian; Anglic; Anglian; North Anglic; Northern English; Northumbrian; Pitmatic
- Early form: Early Modern English
- Writing system: English alphabet

Language codes
- ISO 639-3: –
- Glottolog: nort3300
- Linguasphere: 52-ABA-aba
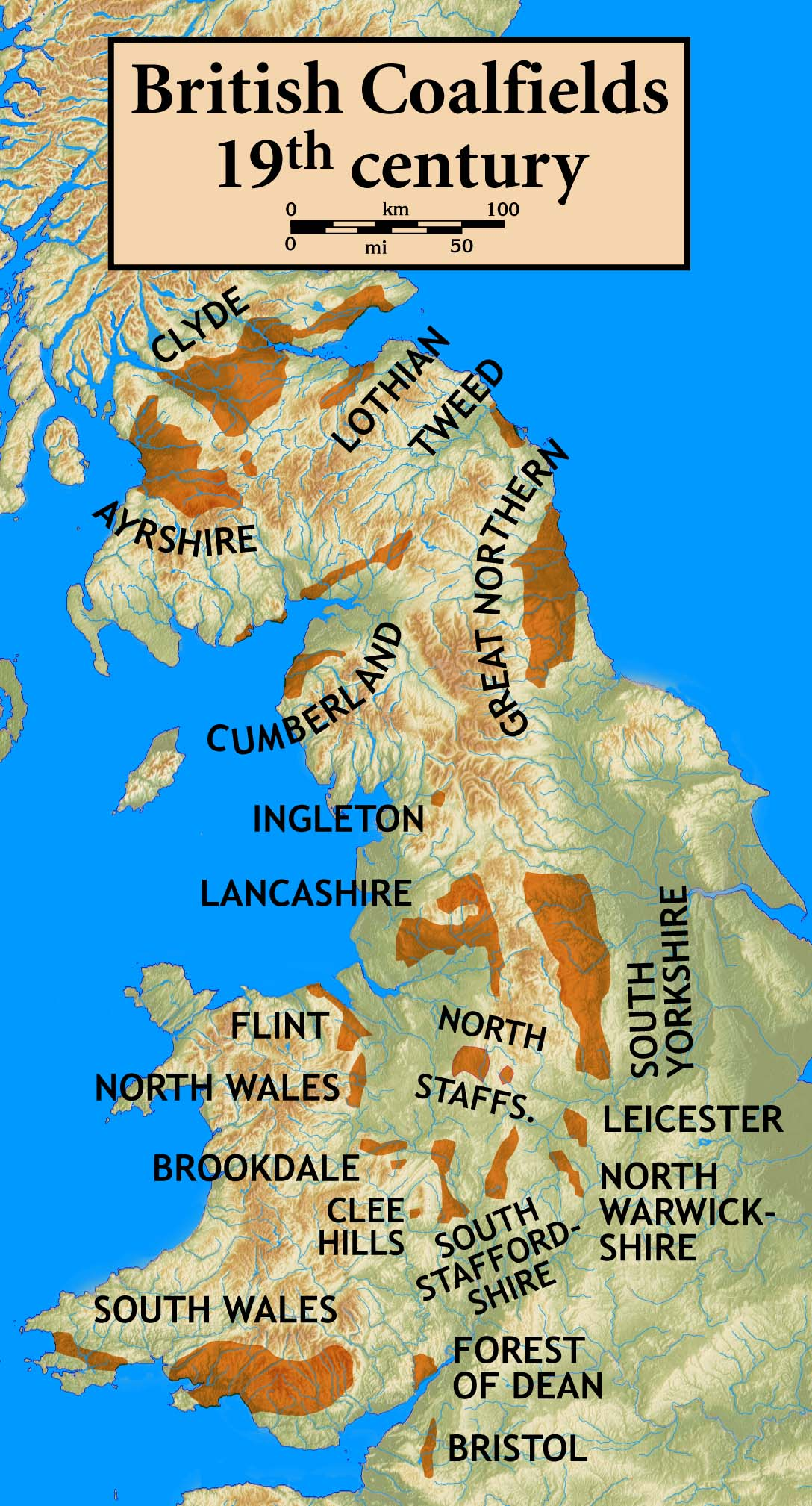
- Map of 19th-century coalfields in Great Britain showing, near top-right, the Great Northern Coalfield, the home of Pitmatic.

Pitmatic – originally 'pitmatical' – is a group of traditional Northern English dialects spoken in rural areas of the Great Northern Coalfield in England.

One lexical feature distinguishing Pitmatic from other Northumbrian dialects, such as Geordie and Mackem, is its use of the mining jargon prevalent in local collieries. For example, in Tyneside and Northumberland, Cuddy is a nickname for St. Cuthbert, while in Alnwick Pitmatic, a cuddy is a pit pony. According to the British Library's lead curator of spoken English, writing in 2019, "Locals insist there are significant differences between Geordie and several other local dialects, such as Pitmatic and Mackem. Pitmatic is the dialect of the former mining areas in County Durham and around Ashington to the north of Newcastle upon Tyne, while Mackem is used locally to refer to the dialect of the city of Sunderland and the surrounding urban area of Wearside".

Traditionally, the dialect used the Northumbrian burr, wherein /r/ is realised as [ʁ]. This is now very rare.

== Dialectology ==
While Pitmatic was spoken by miners throughout the Great Northern Coalfield — from Ashington in Northumberland to Fishburn in County Durham — sources describe its particular use in the Durham collieries. Pitmatic is distinct from the traditional agricultural speech of the Wear and Tees valleys in County Durham, which is classified as part of the 'West Northern' dialect group.

According to Bill Griffiths, the emergence of Pitmatic in County Durham is closely tied to the historical spread of heavy industry southward from the lower Tyne, beginning in the northern and western parts of County Durham and subsequently extending into the eastern districts. As industrialisation progressed, the speech of Tyneside, associated with the 'North Northern' dialect group, functioned as a superstrate, particularly among mobile industrial workers and in urbanised mining communities. This Tyneside superstrate came into contact with the older County Durham substrate, resulting in a series of contact varieties.

=== Dictionaries and compilations ===
Although he did not use the term "Pitmatic", Alexander J. Ellis's seminal survey of English dialects in the late nineteenth century included the language of "Pitmen", focusing on the region "between rivers Tyne and Wansbeck" and drawing on informants from Humshaugh, Earsdon, and Backworth. Dialect words in Northumberland and Tyneside, including many specific to the coal-mining industry, were collected by Oliver Heslop and published in two volumes in 1892 and 1894 respectively.

A dictionary of East Durham Pitmatic spoken in Hetton-le-Hole, compiled by Rev. Francis M. T. Palgrave, was published in 1896 and reprinted in 1997. The heritage society of nearby Houghton-le-Spring produced a list of words and phrases in 2017 collected over the preceding five years. Harold Orton compiled a corpus (dataset) of dialect forms for 35 locations in Northumberland and northern Durham, known as the Orton Corpus.

Pit Talk in County Durham, an illustrated, 90-page pamphlet by Dave Douglass, a local miner, was published in 1973. In 2007, Bill Griffiths produced a dictionary of Pitmatic where each entry includes information on a word's etymology; it was well reviewed. In an earlier work, Griffiths cited a newspaper of 1873 for the first recorded mention of the term "pitmatical".

== Vocabulary ==
Pitmatic words and expressions include:

- alreet* – alright, how are you?
- bairn* – child
- bait^{†} – meal eaten underground
- blaa* – blow
- breed* – bread
- browt* – brought
- byeth^{‡} – both
- beuk* – book
- beut* – boot
- cannet* – cannot, can't
- canny* – nice
- chods* – lumps
- clag* – to stick
- cyak* – cake
- clarts* – mud
- de* – do
- dinnet, dint * – don't
- duds* – clothes
- dunch* – crash, bang together
- fyace* – face
- gan canny ower the greaser^{†} – mind how you go (Note: The greaser was a mechanism installed between the rails of the mine railway that lubricated the wheels of coal-carrying tubs.)
- gannin* – going
- gansey* – have a go
- had yer hand* – hold on a minute
- heed* – head
- hoggers* – shorts worn by miners
- hose^{†} – pipe conveying compressed air
- hoss* – horse
- howk* – to remove or extract
- hoy* – to throw
- hyem* – home
- impittent* – impudent
- jesting* – joking
- jigger^{†} – vibrating trough for cleaning coal
- jowling^{†} – tapping the wall or ceiling of a mine to check its condition
- keep had young'un* – take care
- kets* – sweets
- knaa* – know
- lektrishun^{†} – electrician
- lass* – girl
- lugs* – ears
- maingate^{†} – principal roadway in a mine
- marra* – mate, friend, work-mate
- myak*; myek, mak^{‡} – make
- myest^{‡} – most
- ne* – no (determiner)
- netty* – toilet
- nivver* – never
- oot-by^{†} – direction towards the mineshaft
- ower* – over
- plodge* – to walk through mud or water
- rammel^{†} – worthess stone mixed with coal
- rapping^{†} – transmitting signals
- rive* – to tear or rip off
- shul* – shovel
- skeets^{†} – guides for cages (Note: A cage suspended on a wire rope is a conveyance used for moving workers and supplies below the surface of a mine.) going up or down a mineshaft
- spelk* – splinter
- spuggy* – bird, sparrow
- speun* – spoon
- syam* – same
- syek* – sake
- tadger^{†} – electric drill
- tak^{*} – take
- tak had^{†} – take hold, steady yourself (in the cage)
- thee* – your
- windy pick^{†} – pneumatic pick
- winnet* – won't
- wrang* – wrong
- whe* – who
- ye're gettin yersel aheed o the buzzer^{†} – getting above your station, being forward
- yummer* – bad mood

* from Houghton-le-Spring Heritage Society (2017)
^{†} from Griffiths (2007)
‡ from Den Cutts

== Culture ==
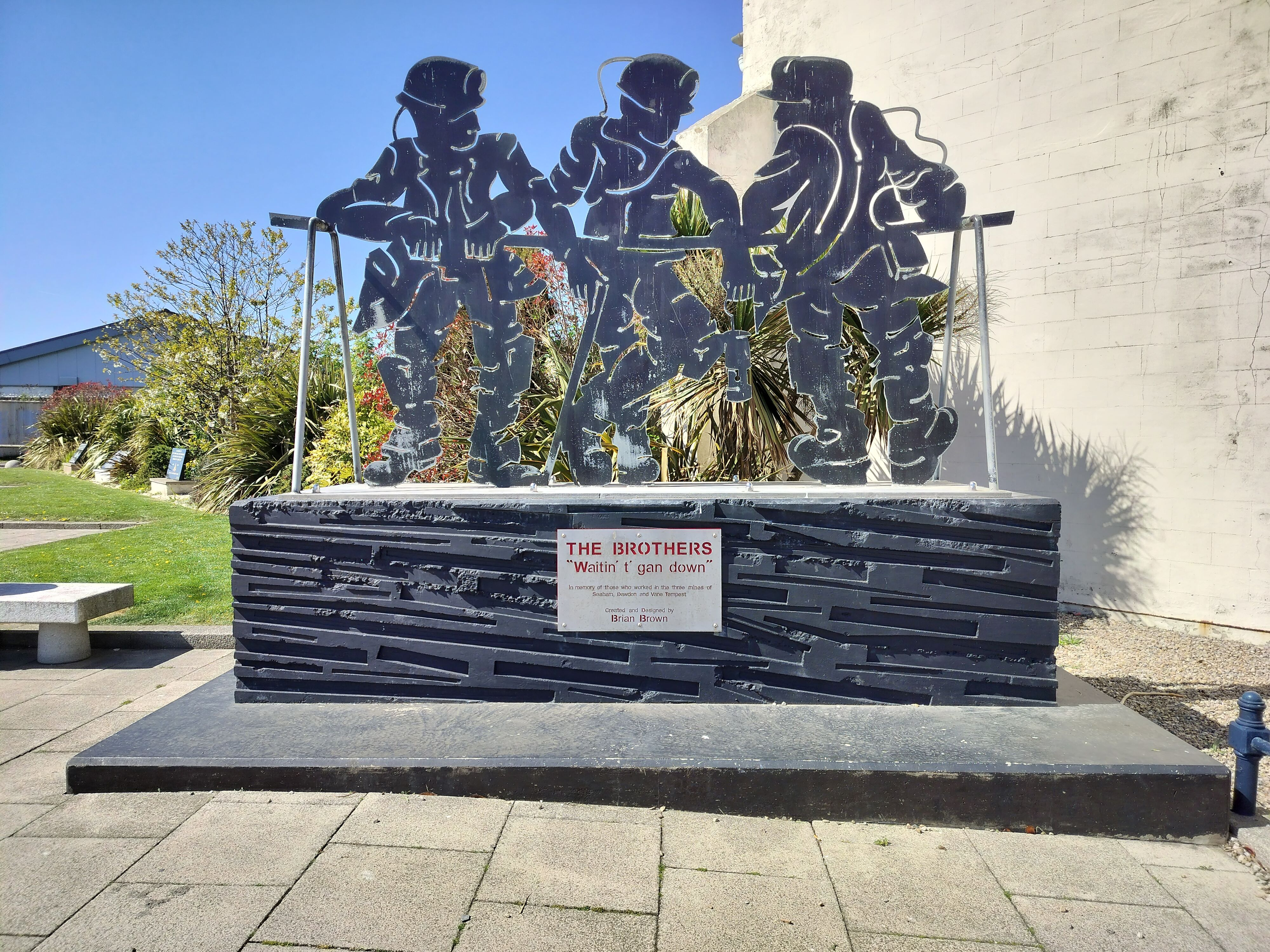
Waitin' t' gan down (Waiting to go down) on a coal mining memorial in Seaham.

In 2000, Melvyn Bragg presented a programme about Pitmatic on BBC Radio 4 as part of a series on English regional dialects.

Pitmatic is heard in parts of the second episode of Ken Loach's 1975 series Days of Hope, which was filmed around Esh Winning in Durham; the cast included local actor Alun Armstrong.

The poet, singer-songwriter and entertainer Tommy Armstrong worked mainly in Pitmatic and Geordie. British comedian Bobby Thompson, popular across North East England, was famous for his Pitmatic accent.

== Related forms of English ==
Other Northern English dialects include:

- Cumbrian and Northumbrian dialects
  - Geordie (spoken in Tyneside); see also Geordie dialect words
  - Mackem (spoken in Wearside)
  - Smoggie (spoken in Teesside)
- Yorkshire and Lancashire dialects
  - Scouse (spoken in Merseyside)
  - Mancunian (Spoken in Manchester)

== See also ==
- English language in Northern England
- Northumbrian dialect – Any of several English dialects spoken in Northumbria, England
