= Northumbrian dialect =

Any of several English dialects spoken in Northumbria, England

- Northumberland and Durham dialect North East dialect
- Native to: England
- Region: Northumberland and Durham (Northumbria)
- Ethnicity: English
- Native speakers: (<307,000 cited 2001)
- Language family: Indo-European: Germanic; West Germanic; North Sea Germanic; Anglo-Frisian; Anglic; Anglian; North Anglic; Northern English; Northumbrian dialect
- Early forms: Old English: Northumbrian Old English; Northern Middle English; Northumbrian Early Modern English

Language codes
- ISO 639-3: –
- Glottolog: nort3300
- Location of the historic counties of Northumberland and Durham in England.

Northumberland and Durham dialect, Northumbrian dialect, or in England North East dialect is any one of several traditional English dialects spoken in the historic counties of Northumberland and County Durham. The term Northumbrian can refer to the region of Northumbria but can also refer specifically to the county of Northumberland. This article focuses on the former definition and thus includes varieties from throughout the wider region, including County Durham. Northumbrian dialects are closely related to Scots and Cumbrian, sharing with them a common origin in Northumbrian Old English.

The traditional dialect has spawned multiple modern varieties, and Northumbrian dialect can also be used to broadly include all of them:

- Geordie, the most famous dialect spoken in the region, largely spoken in Tyneside, centred in Newcastle and Gateshead
- Mackem, a dialect spoken in Wearside, centred on Sunderland
- Smoggie, a dialect spoken in Teesside; an area at the southern tip of region which straddles the border of Yorkshire and County Durham
- Poolie (Hartlepudlian). Spoken in Hartlepool, its own kind of enclave tucked in the South East Durham coast, similar to Pitmatic and Sunderland/EastDurham accents. With more historical Irish and some Teesside influences in the pronunciation of certain words.
- Pitmatic or "Yacker", a group of dialects spoken in mining towns of Northumberland and Durham Coalfield
- Berwick dialect, spoken in Berwick-upon-Tweed, the northernmost town in England
- The only rhotic or variably rhotic dialect left in the region (Northumberland and northern Durham), nearly extinct, which uses the Northumbrian burr, mostly spoken today only by the oldest rural, male speakers.

== Dialect divisions ==
=== 19th century ===
Alexander John Ellis, a 19th century linguist and philologist, divided Northumberland and Durham into three main dialect groups based on their linguistic features. Ellis considered the bulk of Northumberland and northern County Durham as belonging to the "North Northern" dialect group. This group was deemed to be a transitional variety between other Northern dialects (those north of the Humber–Lune Line) and Scots, but overall still considered a form of Northern English. However, a small portion of northwestern Northumberland around the Cheviot hills was deemed to be Scots-speaking and therefore categorised as a variety of the Scots language. The southern part of County Durham was considered part of the 'West Northern' dialect group, which was deemed to be more closely related to Richmondshire and Cumbrian dialects, especially that of the Vale of Eden. Like Cumbrian, the dialect of south Durham was subject to greater Scandinavian influence than the rest of Durham and Northumberland. Scandinavian influence is evident in the naming of streams in south Durham, which are typically named "becks" (from the Old Norse "bekkr"). In contrast, "burns" (from the Old English "burna") are found in north Durham and Northumberland.

=== 21st century ===
Urban North East English dialects are a group of English dialects spoken in urban areas of the North East of England, including major cities such as Newcastle upon Tyne, Sunderland, and Middlesbrough. These dialects have emerged as a result of the region's rapid urbanization during the 19th and 20th centuries, which brought about significant social and demographic changes. In comparison to traditional dialects, urban North East English dialects have undergone a greater degree of dialect levelling. A tripartite division is recognised among modern urban dialects in the North East of England, which distinguishes between the northern, central, and southern urban dialects:

- Northern Urban North-Eastern English: Tyneside and urban Northumberland
- Central Urban North-Eastern English: Sunderland and much of Durham unitary authority
- Southern Urban North-Eastern English: Teesside, Hartlepool and Darlington

Central and northern urban dialects retain a decidedly Northumbrian base, but have been shaped by a standard English superstrate, resulting in hybrid dialects that incorporate elements of both traditional dialects and more standardised forms of English. On the other hand, the southern urban dialects have been subject to more significant dialect restructuring, resulting in a dialect which, while still North Eastern in character, lacks more marked Northumbrian forms such as 'gan' (to go) and 'divvent' or 'dinnet' (don't) that survive in Tyneside, Wearside and Durham.

== Phonology ==
=== Consonants ===
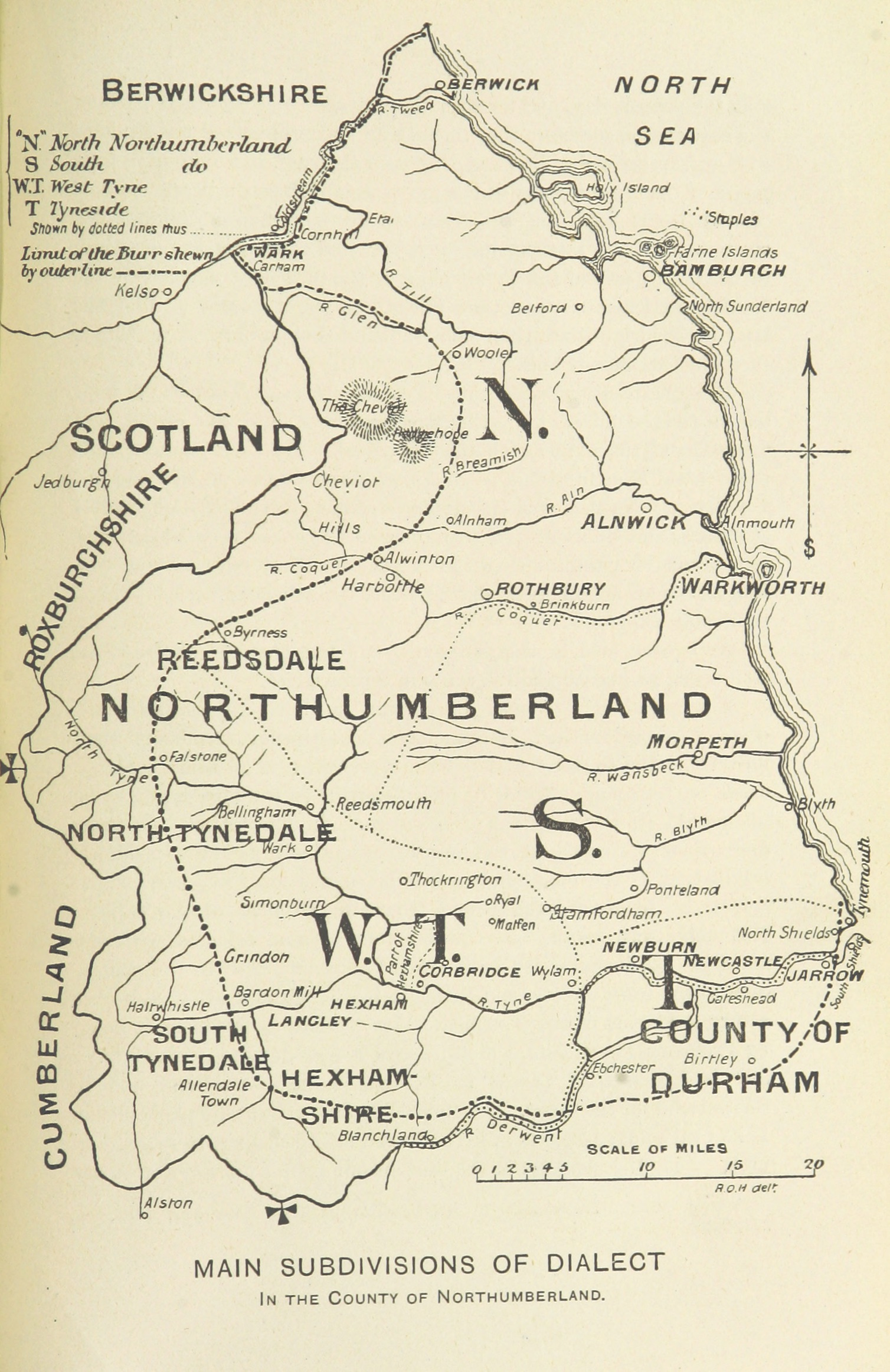
A 19th century dialect map of Northumberland and north Durham. The limit of the Northumbrian burr is shown by the outline.

- Northumbrian burr: the uvular pronunciation of /r/ as [ʁ] was prevalent in traditional dialects throughout much of Northumberland as well as northwestern County Durham.
  - Exceptions in Northumberland included Tynemouth; the Scots-speaking Cheviots; and the south-west of the Country, where it was pronounced [ɾ].
  - The Northumbrian burr was typically absent from the further south in Durham. However, it was intermittently present in varieties of Durham Pitmatic spoken in the northeastern section of the Durham coalfield, which formed a transitional region extending as far south as Kelloe. The development of coal mining in the region and the ensuing in-migration from Northumberland to meet the increased demand for labour likely contributed to the presence of the burr in these Pitmatic varieties. Nowadays, the feature is mostly restricted to elderly rural residents of Northumberland.
- /hw/ is traditionally realised as [ʍ] in Northumberland and upper Weardale; on Tyneside and throughout the rest of Durham, it is typically /w/ as in Standard English.
- In contrast to most varieties of Northern English, traditional dialects north of the Tees are largely H-retaining. Northumberland and north Durham dialects are fully H-retaining while south Durham dialects occupy a transitional zone and exhibit variable H-retention.
- As with most Northern English dialects, final /ŋ/ sound is reduced to [n] e.g. gannin for "ganging" ("going").
- In common with most dialects of England, Northumbrian has lost /x/. Scots /x/ typically corresponds to /f/ in Northumbrian cognates, compare Scots loch [lɔx] and cleuch/cleugh [kluːx] with Northumbrian lough [lɒf] and cleugh [kljʊf].
- Unlike most Northern English dialects /l/ is clear in all cases and never velarised.
- The most conservative forms of the dialect undergo L-vocalization as in Scots, thus wall is waa and needful is needfu.
- Allophonic [ç] develops before reflexes of Old English /ā/ and /ō/ in certain dialects, for example, Coxhoe dialect table [tçabl̩], hook [çɵk], home [çɛm]; Newbiggin dialect haven [çɛvn̩] and home [çɛm].

	Labial	Dental	Alveolar	Postalveolar	Palatal	Velar	Uvular	Glottal
Nasal	m		n			ŋ		
Stop	p b		t d	t͡ʃ d͡ʒ		k ɡ		ʔ
Fricative	f v	θ ð	s z	ʃ ʒ			ʁ	h
Approximant			(ɹ)		j	ʍ w	ʁ	
Lateral			l					

=== Vowels ===
- Old English and Old Norse /ī/ and /ȳ/, together with Old English /i/ before /ld/, /y/ before /nd/, and Old French /i/, are subject to the Scottish Vowel Length Rule. In Northumberland and north Durham these vowels are typically realised as [ɛɪ] when short and [aɪ] when long. In south Durham they are generally realised as [aɪ] when short and [ɑɪ] when long.
- Under the influence of the Northumbrian burr, the NURSE–NORTH merger is widespread throughout most of Northumberland and north Durham, though vowels remain unmerged south Durham and parts of southwest Northumberland. The merged vowel is typically realised as [ɔː~ɔʁə], producing forms such as bord (bird) and forst (first).
- Old English /i/ remains as [ɪ] before /nd/, in words such as blind and find.
- Old English /u/ likewise remains [ʊ] before /nd/, producing forms such as pund (pound) and fund (found).
- Old English /a/ remains unrounded before /ŋ/, for example lang (long) and wrang (wrong).
- Old English /ū/ is generally retained as the long monophthong [uː] throughout the region, though it undergoes limited diphthongisation to [ʊu] in parts of south Durham.
- The regular development of Old English /ā/ shows several distinct developments.
  - Initially (and before /h/), it develops to [jɪ~jɛ~ja], giving forms such as yin, yen, and yan (one). The [ja] type is chiefly characteristic of south Durham; [jɛ] is characteristic of north Durham and south Northumberland; while [jɪ] is characteristic of north Northumberland.
  - Medially, it develops either into a centring diphthong [iə], characteristic of the western dialects, or into opening diphthongs such as [ĭe~ĭɛ~ĭa], characteristic of the eastern dialects. Within the eastern area, these form a continuum from relatively close realisations in the north-east to more open realisations in the south-east.
  - Before /r/, the vowel typically develops either into a centring diphthong [ɛə] or an opening diphthong [eʚ], with long monophthongal reflexes [æː] reported in south Durham. This yields forms such as mair ("more") and sair ("sore").
- Old English /o/ (open o) develops into [uə~oə] in western Northumberland and Durham and [øː] in eastern Northumberland and on Tyneside, as in hole and coal. This occurs in loanwords from standard English within the /ā/ set, such as goat.
- Old English /ō/ regularly develops into [ĭɵ] in eastern dialects, while in western dialects it merges with the medial reflex of OE ā, producing [iə].
- Old English /āw/ (as in craw (crow) and knaw (know)) generally develop an open unrounded vowel, though rounded reflexes develop in western dialects.
- Old English /ē/ is generally realised as [iː] in Northumberland and north Durham. In south Durham it is diphthongised to [ɛɪ] or [ɪi].
  - Old English /ēa/ likewise develops alongside /ē/, in contrast to the shortened reflexes found in Standard English. It likewise produces [iː] in Northumberland and north Durham, but [ɛɪ~ɪi] in south Durham, as in heed ("head") and breed ("bread").

Monophthongs of Northumbrian (Tyneside)
	Front			Central	Back	
	Unrounded		Rounded	Central	Back	
	Short	Long	Rounded	Central	Short	Long
Close	ɪ	iː			ʊ	uː
Close-mid		eː	øː	ə		oː
Open-mid	ɛ	ɛː		ə		ɔː
Open	a	aː			ɒ	ɒː

==== Diphthongs ====
Diphthongs of Northumbrian (Tyneside)
		Endpoint		
		Front	Central	Back
Start point	Front	ai	iɐ	æu
Start point	Back	oe	uɐ	

=== Berwick-upon-Tweed ===
Berwick-upon-Tweed is unique within Northumberland. The local speech has characteristics of the North Northumbrian dialect and due to its geographical location, has characteristics of the East Central Scots dialect as well.

A sociological study of the Anglo-Scottish border region conducted in the year 2000 found that locals of Alnwick, 30 miles (48 km) south of Berwick, associated the Berwick accent with Scottish influence. Conversely, those from Eyemouth, Scotland, 9 miles (14 km) north of Berwick, firmly classed Berwick speech as English, identifying it as Northumbrian.

== Classification in relation to English and Scots ==
The Northumbrian Language Society (NLS), founded in 1983 to research, preserve and promote the Northumbrian language variety, considers it divergent enough to be not a dialect of Modern Standard English but, rather, a related but separate Anglic language of its own, since it is largely not comprehensible by standard English speakers. Northumbrian has perhaps an even closer relationship with Modern Scots, and the NLS regards both as distinct but closely related languages derived from Old English; however, mainstream scholarly sources regard them as essentially the same language, albeit with minor differences. The similarities are not commonly or formally recognised, possibly due to sensitivities on both sides of the border. The status of Scots and Northumbrian as either languages or dialects therefore remains open to debate.

== Grammar ==
=== Nouns ===
Northumbrian includes some weak plurals such as ee/een (eye/eyes) and coo/kye (cow/cows) that survived from Old English into Northumbrian. Nouns of measure remain unchanged in the plural: fower fuit (four feet), twe mile (two miles), and five pund (five pounds)

=== Pronouns ===
Standard English	Northumbrian
I, me, myself, mine, my	aw, me/uz, mysel, mine, my/maw
thou, thee, thyself, thine, thy (Early Modern English)	thou, thee, thysel, thine, thy/thaw
we, us, ourselves, ours, our	we, (h)uz/we, oursels/worsels, our/wor
you (singular), you (plural), yourself, yours, your	you/ye, you(se)/ye(se), yoursel/yersel
they, them, themselves, theirs, their	they, them, themsels/theirsels, theirs, their

T–V distinction, or the of the singular second-person pronouns thou, thy and thee are traditionally used in Durham and South Northumberland. In North Northumberland, only ye is encountered.

In modern Tyneside speech, we can be used for the first-person plural object (us).

==== Other pronouns ====
English	Northumbrian
this, these	this, these/thur/thor
that, those	that/thae, them/thur/thor/thae
anyone	onybody
anything	onything
nothing	nowt/nowse
something	summat/summick
everyone	iverybody
everything	iverything
both	baith/byeth/byath
each	each ilka (archaic)
every	ivery ilka (archaic)
other	other

=== Verbs ===
aw’s (I is) and thou's (thou is) are the first and second person present forms of the verb "to be" in Durham and south Northumberland. In north Northumberland aw'm (I am) is used as in Scots and Standard English.

Similar to Scots, double modals are used in the Northumbrian dialect. For example, the English verb "to be able" is in Northumbrian in the older form "te can".

Standard English	Northumbrian
I used to be able to sing	Aw used te could sing
You'll not be able to do that	Ye'll not can de that
He hadn't been able to do it	He hadn't could de it

==== Auxiliary Verbs ====
Standard English	Northumbrian
are, aren't	are, aren't
can, can't	can, cannet/canna
could, couldn't	could, couldn't
dare, daren't	dar, darn't
did, didn't	did, didn't
do, don't	de/div, dinnet/dinna/divn't
had, hadn't	hed, hedn't
have, haven't	hae/hev, hennet/henna/hevn't
might, mightn't	might/meet, mightn't/meetn't mud, mudn't (South Durham)
must, mustn't	mun, munnet/munna
need, needn't	need, needn't
should, shouldn't	shud/sud, shudn't/sudn't
was, wasn't	was/wes, wasn't
were, weren't	war, warn't
will, won't	will, winnet/winna
would, wouldn't	wad, wadn't

=== Articles ===
In Northumberland and north Durham the definite article is unreduced as in Standard English and Scots. This is considered a peculiarity among Northern English dialects. In south Durham the definite article is traditionally reduced to [t] or [d], usually written as t'. An isogloss running just north of Bishop Auckland separates the two varieties.

== Examples ==
In 1883, Prince Louis-Lucien Bonaparte was granted a civil list pension for his work on English dialects. His dialect studies draw upon both written texts and the results of field work, which consisted of the direct interrogation of native speakers. In 1862 he published a compilation of 24 dialectal translations of the Old Testament passage, The Song of Solomon, which he commissioned from local dialectologists from throughout England and southern Scotland. According to a register of his known works, six Biblical translations were commissioned in the Northumbrian dialects, four of which appear in The Song of Solomon.

Northumbrian has no single standard orthography, and conventions vary between authors. In these examples, orthography has been partially normalised to provide a consistent basis for comparison, while retaining individual dialect features and remaining as faithful as possible to the original texts.

Verse	Weardale	Northumberland	Newcastle	English Standard Version (ESV)
1	Be neet on me bed aw sowt him at me sowl luveth: aw sowt him, bud aw fand him nut.	Be neet on me bed aw sowt him it maw sowl luves: aw sowt him, but aw cuddent find him.	Be neet on maw bed aw sowt him whe maw sowl luivs: aw sowt him, but aw diddent find him.	On my bed by night I sought him whom my soul loves; I sought him, but found him not.
2	Aw'll rise noo, an gan aboot t' city, i' t' streets an i' t' braead ways aw'll seek him at me sowl luveth: aw sowt him, bud aw fand him nut.	Aw'll get up noo, an gan aboot the toon i' the streets, an i' the tornpikes aw'll leuk for him it maw sowl luves; aw leukt for him, but aw cuddent find him.	Aw'll get up noo, an gan aboot the toon i' the streets, an i' the braid ways aw'll seek him whe maw sowl luivs: aw sowt him, but aw diddent find him.	“I will rise now and go about the city, in the streets and in the squares; I will seek him whom my soul loves.” I sought him, but found him not.
3	T' watchmen at gan aboot t' city fand me. Te them aw sed, "Saw ye him at me sowl luveth?"	The watchmin it gans aboot the toon fand us: aw says tiv thim, "Hae ye seed owt o him it maw sowl luves?"	The watchmen that gan aboot the toon fund me: te whe aw said, "Saw ye him whe maw sowl luivs?"	The watchmen found me as they went about the city. “Have you seen him whom my soul loves?”
4	T' was bud a bit at aw passed frae them, bud aw fand him at me sowl luveth. Aw held him, an waddent let him gan, til aw'd browt him intuv me mudder's hoose, an intud chamber uv hur at bred me.	Aw'd hardlies gean away fra thim, thin aw fand him it maw sowl luves; aw clapped ahad on him, an waddent let him gan, tiv aw'd fetcht him intiv me muthor's hoose, an intiv the bed-rum o hur it bore us.	Aw'd nobbut left them when aw fund whe maw sowl luivs: aw hadded him, an waddent let him gan, tiv aw browt him te maw muthor's hoose, an intiv the chaumer o her that conceived me.	Scarcely had I passed them when I found him whom my soul loves. I held him, and would not let him go until I had brought him into my mother’s house, and into the chamber of her who conceived me.
5	Aw charge ye, O ye dowters uv Jerewsalem, be t' roes an be t' heynds ud field, at ye stur nut up nor waaken me luv til he please.	Noo, aw chairge ye, O ye dowtors o Jeruz'lem, be the bucks an the does o the field, it ye dinnet stur, nor roose up maw luve tiv he likes.	Aw chairge ye, O ye dowtors o Jeruzalum, be the roes an be the hinds o the field, that ye stor nut up nor wyeken maw luiv tiv he likes.	I adjure you, O daughters of Jerusalem, by the gazelles or the does of the field, that you not stir up or awaken love until it pleases.
6	Whe's this at cums oot ud wilderness leyke pillers uv reek, scented wi myrrh an frankincense, wi ō powders ud marchent?	Whe's yon it cums oot ower the moor, like pillors o reek, sçaentid wi myrrh an wi ā the poothurs o the maerchint?	Whe's this that cums oot o the wildorness like pillors o reek, sçainted wi myrrh an frankincense, wi ā pouthers o the maerchant?	Who is this coming up from the wilderness like columns of smoke, perfumed with myrrh and frankincense, with all the fragrant powders of the merchant?
7	Behowld his bed, whilk's Solomun's. Threescower valiant men er aboot it, uv t' valiant men uv Israel.	See it his bed! that's Solomon's; threescore sowlgers stans roond aboot it, ā the bravist o Isril.	Sees-ta the bed, which is Solomon's: threescore valiant men ar aboot it, o the valiant o Israel.	Behold, it is Solomon’s carriage; sixty mighty men are around it, of the mighty men of Israel.
8	They ō hoad swerds, bein clivver i war. Ivery man hes his swerd atoppiv his thee, becouse they'r flaid i t' neet.	They ā weer swurds a-piece, 'caws they'r nimmel i battle; ivery yen hes a swurd biv his thee, 'caws they'r feered o the neet.	They ā had swurds, bein expert i war: ivery man hes his swurd upon his thee, becaws o dreed i the neet.	All of them wield swords and are expert in war; each has his sword at his thigh, against terror by night.
9	King Solomun maade hissel a chariot ud wud uv Lebanon.	King Solomon beelt hissel a cairige mead oot o the timmor o Leb'nin.	King Solomon myed hissel a chariot o the wud o Lebanon.	King Solomon made himself a carriage from the wood of Lebanon.
10	He maade t' pillers on't uv silver, t' boddom on't uv gowld, t' cuverin on't uv purple, t' middle on't bein paaved wi luv, for t' dowters uv Jerewsalem.	He mead the posts on't o sillor, the floorin on't o goold, the cuvor-pairt on't o porple, an the middle on't wis flagged wi luve for the dowtors o Jeruz'lem.	He myed the pillors thareon't o sillor, the bottom thareon't o gowld, the coverin on't o porple, the middle thareon't bein pyeved wi luiv, for the dowtors o Jeruzalum.	He made its posts of silver, its back of gold, its seat of purple; its interior was inlaid with love by the daughters of Jerusalem.
11	Gan furth, O ye dowters uv Zion, an behowld King Solomun wi t' croon at his mudder crooned him wi i t' days uv his espousals, an i the day ud gladness uv his heart.	Gan yor ways oot, O ye dowtors o Zion, an see it King Solomon weerin the croon it his muthor crooned him wiv on his weddin-day, an i the day o the greet plishur o his heart.	Gan forth, O ye dowtors o Zion, an luik at King Solomon wi the croon wi which his muthor crooned him if the day o his espousals, an i the day o the gladness o his heart.	Go out, O daughters of Zion, and look upon King Solomon, upon the crown with which his mother crowned him on the day of his wedding, the day of the gladness of his heart.

== Vocabulary ==
Some Northumbrian words include:

- aw / aa - I
- aboot - about
- alreet or aareet / awreet - a variation on "alright" or "hello" (often used in the phrase "aalreet mate").
- aye - yes
- bairn/grandbairn - child/grandchild
- bari - "good" or "lovely"
- banter - chat/gossip
- belter - "really good", used in the film Purely Belter
- bess - "please ya bess" for "please yourself"
- te boule - to roll, however te boule aboot means to "mess around"
- bray - to overpower or defeat someone, usually in a physical sense
- byer - cattle shed
- cannet or canna - cannot
- canny - "pleasant", or like in Scots "quite" (therefore something could be described as "canny canny")
- chud - chewing gum
- clart or clarts - "mud" as in "there's clarts on yor beuts", or to act foolishly as in "divvent clart aboot".
- cuddy - a small horse or a pony
- te dee - do
- deeks - "look" as in "Gie’s a deeks" - "Gimme a look"
- dinnet, divvent or dinna - "don't"
- divvie - an insult, referring to a stupid person
- doon - down
- ee - oh, an exclamation of shock
- feyther, fatther, or fadder - "father"
- te gan - to go ("gannin" or "gaan" = going)
- gadgie - man
- git awesh - "go away"
- geet, varry - very
- gie's- "Give me", compare "Gimme"
- had / haud - "hold" example: keep ahad means "keep ahold" or "look after", and haud yor gob means "keep quiet".]
- hev or hae - have
- hacky - "dirty"
- haddaway - "get away"
- hairn (or hen) - similar to "hinny", see below
- hinny a term of endearment - "Honey"
- hoose - house
- ho'wair, ho'way or ha'way - "come on"
- te hoy - to throw
- hyem - "home"
- us- me, for example Pass us the gully meaning "Pass me the knife"
- ket - sweets
- te knaw / te knaa - know
- lekky - electricity, or electric
- te lend - often used for borrow, (lend us a bi meaning "Can I borrow a pen?")
- like - used as a filler in many sentences; usually every other word, e.g. like, is he on aboot me or like, summat, like?
- mair for "more" (compare with German "mehr")
- mam/ma a variation of Mother
- man - often used as a generic term of address, as in "Giv uz it heor noo man" or "haway man"
- marra - Friend. Used like "mate" - aareet marra meaning "hello friend")
- me or ma - my (compare: myself > meself or mesel)
- mollycoddle - overprotect, "wrap in cotton wool"
- muckle - similar to "canny", in the sense of meaning "quite". It can also mean "big", for instance "Yon hoose hez a muckle windae" means "that house has a big window"
- ner, na or nar - no
- neb - nose (nebby = nosey)
- neet - night
- nettie - toilet
- nivvor - never
- noo - now,
- nowt - nothing
- owt - anything
- pet - a term of address or endearment towards a woman or a child
- plodge - to stomp about or wade through something ungracefully
- radge or radgie - crazy
- sel - "self" as in mesel = myself, yersel = yourself, hesel = himself, horsel = herself, waselves, thaselves
- shuttin for "shooting" thus simply shortening the "oo" vowel sound
- snek - nose
- spelk - a splinter
- stot - to bounce. A well-known local bread bun called a 'stottie cake' receives its name from the fact the dough is 'stotted' about when being made.
- summat or summick - something
- tab - cigarette
- tiv or te - to. The former is usually used when the following word begins with a vowel. There's nowt tiv it - "there's nothing to it"
- toon - town (or specifically Newcastle)
- wa - "our". used in a more general sense unlike "wor" below as in "Divvint touch wa bags" means "Don't touch our bags"
- willent, winnit - "won't"
- wor - our, Used primarily to denote a family member, such as "wor bairn"
- wu - "us" in Northumberland and Tyneside as in What ye deein te wu? means "What are you doing to us?". "us" is used in Durham and Wearside.
- yark - verb meaning to hit or move abrasively. Believed to be a corruption of "jerk"
- ye or 'ee for you as in What are 'ee deein meaning "What are you doing?"
- yor, thee - your

== See also ==
- Northumbria (modern)
- Language secessionism
