= Mackem =

Nickname for Sunderland, UK, people

- Wearside English, Sunderland English
- Native to: England
- Region: Wearside
- Ethnicity: English
- Language family: Indo-European: Germanic; West Germanic; North Sea Germanic; Anglo-Frisian; Anglic; Anglian; North Anglic; Northern English; Northumbrian; Mackem
- Early forms: Old English: Middle English

Language codes
- ISO 639-3: –

Mackem, Makem or Mak'em is a nickname for residents of and people from Sunderland, a city in North East England. It is also a name for the local dialect and accent (not to be confused with Geordie); and for a fan, of whatever origin, of Sunderland A.F.C. It has been used by some people from Sunderland to describe themselves since the 1980s, prior to which it was mainly used in Tyneside as a disparaging exonym. An alternative name for a Mackem (except in the sense of a football supporter) is a Wearsider.

According to the British Library, "Locals insist there are significant differences between Geordie [spoken in Newcastle upon Tyne] and several other local dialects, such as Pitmatic and Mackem. Pitmatic is the dialect of the former mining areas in County Durham and around Ashington to the north of Newcastle upon Tyne, while Mackem is used locally to refer to the dialect of the city of Sunderland and the surrounding urban area of Wearside."

== Etymology ==
There is much debate about the origin of the word "Mackem", although it has been argued that it may stem from the phrase "Mak 'em and tak 'em", with "Mak 'em" being the local pronunciation of "make them" and "tak 'em" deriving from "take them".

According to the current entry in the Oxford English Dictionary, the earliest occurrence of the word Mackem or Mak’em in print was in 1988. However, as evidenced by the attached news articles, the word Mak’em (or Mackem) has been much in evidence for a great many years prior to 1988. Indeed, one of the articles attached dates to 1929.

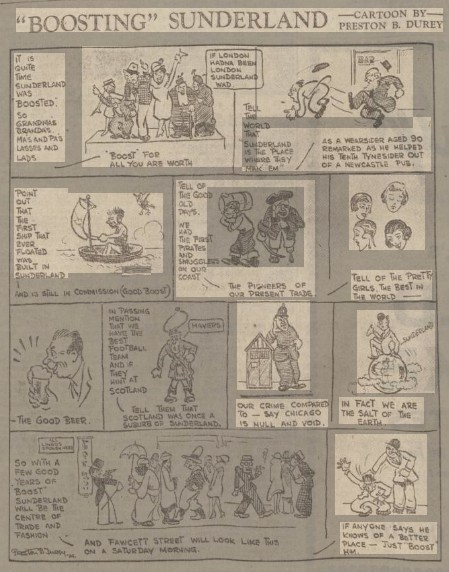
An article from 1929 in Sunderland Echo discussing Makem.

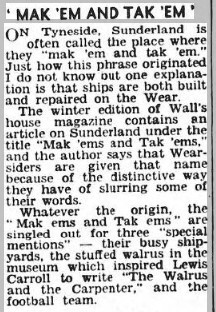
An article from 1953 in Sunderland Echo discussing Makem.

It has been argued that the expressions date back to the height of Sunderland's shipbuilding history, as the shipwrights would make the ships, then the maritime pilots and tugboat captains would take them down the River Wear to the sea – the shipyards and port authority being the most conspicuous employers in Sunderland. A variant explanation is that the builders at Sunderland would build the ships, which would then go to Tyneside to be outfitted, hence from the standpoint of someone from Sunderland, "we make 'em an' they take 'em" – however, this account is disputed (and, indeed, as an earlier form of the name was Mac n' Tac, it seems unlikely). Another explanation is that ships were both built and repaired (i.e. "taken in for repairs") on the Wear.

Evidence suggests the term is a recent coinage. According to the Oxford English Dictionary, the earliest occurrence of it in print was in 1988. The phrase "we still tak'em and mak'em" was found in a sporting context in 1973 in reference to Sunderland Cricket & Rugby Football Club. While this lends support to the theory that this phrase was the origin of the term "Mak'em", there is nothing to suggest that "mak'em" had come to be applied to people from Sunderland generally at such a date. The name "Mak'em" may refer to the Wearside shipyard workers, who during World War II were brought into shipbuilding and regarded as taking work away from the Geordies on Tyneside.

== Characteristics ==
There has been very little academic work done on the Sunderland dialect. It was a site in the early research by Alexander John Ellis, who also recorded a local song called Spottee. Ellis regarded Sunderland as speaking a variant of the North Durham dialect, which it shared with much of the Durham Coalfield. He considered Sunderland to be situated near a dialectal boundary. The nearby village of Ryhope and a narrow coastal strip running south, which at the time had not yet been incorporated into the coalfield, were placed within the South Durham dialectal region. This region also included the dialects of Weardale and Teesdale. Ellis also noted the influence on Sunderland speech from migrants to the area from Ireland and Scotland.

Come all ye good people and listen to me,
And a comical tale I will tell unto ye,
Belanging yon Spottee that lived on the Law Quay,
That had nowther house nor harbour he.
The poor auld wives o’ the north side disn’t knaw what for te de,
For they dare not come to see their husbands when they come to the Quay;
They’re feared o’ their sel’s, and their infants, tee,
For this roguish fellow they call Spottee.
But now he’s gane away unto the sea-side,
Where mony a ane wishes he may be weshed away wi’ the tide,
For if Floutter’s flood come, as it us’d for te de,
It will drive his heart out then where will his midred be?

— An excerpt of the song Spottee from The Bishoprick Garland. The song includes features considered archaic in the modern dialect.

In the Survey of English Dialects, the nearby town of Washington was surveyed. The researcher of the site, Stanley Ellis, later worked with police on analysing the speech in a tape sent to the police during the Yorkshire Ripper investigation, which became known as the Wearside Jack tape because the police switched their investigation to Wearside after Ellis's analysis of the tape.

To people outside the region, the differences between Mackem and Geordie dialects often seem marginal, but there are many notable differences. A perceptual dialect study by the University of Sunderland found that locals of the region consider Geordie and Mackem to be separate dialects and identify numerous lexical, grammatical, and phonetic differences between the two. In fact, Mackem is considered to be more closely related to Durham dialects than to those of Tyneside. There are even a small but noticeable differences in pronunciation and grammar between the dialects of North and South Sunderland (for example, the word something in North Sunderland is often summik whereas a South Sunderland speaker may often prefer summat and people from the surrounding areas prefer summit).

== Phonology ==
- Make and take are pronounced mak and tak ([ˈmak] and [ˈtak]) in the most conservative forms of the dialect. This variation is the supposed reason why Tyneside shipyard workers might have coined "Mak'em" as an insult. However, the pronunciation of the word is not confined to Sunderland and can be found in other areas of Northern England and Scotland.
- Many words ending in -own are pronounced [-ʌun] (cf. Geordie: [-uːn]).
- School is split into two syllables, with a short [ə] in between, [ˈskʉ.əl]. This is also the case for words with a GOOSE vowel preceding /l/, which are monosyllabic in some other dialects, such as cruel, fuel and fool, in Mackem which are [ˈkrʉ.əl], [ˈfjʉ.əl] and [ˈfʉ.əl] respectively.
- This "extra syllable" occurs in other words spoken in Mackem dialect, i.e. film is [ˈfɪləm]. This feature has led to some words being very differently pronounced in Sunderland. The word face, due to the inclusion of an extra [ə] and the contraction thereof, is often pronounced [ˈfjas]. While [ˈfjas] and some other cases of this extra vowel have been observed in the Geordie dialect,
- Book rhymes with spook as in Northumberland and on Tyneside, however, there is a difference in vowel quality between Tyneside [ˈbuːk] and Mackem [bʉːk], [bəuk] or [ˈbᵊuk].
- The COMMA vowel pronounced [ə] as in Received Pronunciation, unlike the rhotic Scots variant. Cf. Geordie [æ].
- Most words that have the TRAP vowel are pronounced with a short /æ/ such as after, laughter, pasta. However, in the same way as the Geordie dialect, the words plaster and master are often pronounced with a long /ɑː/. This is not found in most northern accents apart from in the North East.
- The Mackem accent is different from Geordie in some instances. For example, the pronunciation of curry is often more like cerry. As well as this the use of oo <u:> in words with the BROWN vowel isn't as frequent as it is in the Geordie accent (Sunderland=town v Newcastle=toon), however, this feature was traditionally found in all dialects north of the Humber–Lune Line.
- In words such as green and cheese it has been said that the Sunderland accent has more of a [ɛi] diphthong instead of the standard /iː/ vowel in most dialects of English.
- H-dropping in words such as him, her, half is said to be a feature in Sunderland, Butterknowle, Hartlepool and Middlesbrough, but not in other areas of the North East.
- /l/ is traditionally clear in all contexts, meaning the velarised allophone is absent.

== Grammar ==
=== Definite article ===
Unlike some Northern English varieties the definite article is never reduced. As in Scots and other Northumbrian dialects the definite article is used in a wider range of contexts than in standard English, including kinship terms, names of institutions, temporal expressions, illnesses, and even numbers.

=== Indefinite Article ===
The indefinite article is used with one in certain contexts.

=== Modal verbs ===
Modals can and will as well as the verb de (do) have uncontracted negative forms.

| Word | Affirmative | Negative |
|---|---|---|
| do | de | dinnet |
| will | will | winnet |
| can | can | cannet |

The use of dinnet contrasts with Geordie divvent.

=== Pronouns ===
| Standard English | Mackem |
|---|---|
| I, me, myself, mine, my | I, is, mesel, mine, me |
| we, us, ourselves, ours, our | we, us, oursels, our |
| you (singular), you (plural), yourself, yours, your | ye, youse, yoursel/yersel, your/yer |
| they, them, themselves, theirs, their | they, them, themsels/theirsels, theirs, their |

== Vocabulary ==
- aight – eight
- alang – along
- alarn – alone
- an arl – as well, also (compare Scots an aw)
- an't – aren't (interrogative)
- aye – yes
- beut – boot
- blar – blow
- canny – good or a lot
- card – cold
- clarts – mud
- clip – slap; in a poor state
- clivver – clever
- clout – hit
- dinnar – dunno
- diz – does
- dizn't – doesn't
- fower – four
- fyace, pyat – face
- gan – go
- garn – going (gannin is favoured in surrounding colliery towns)
- gie's – give me
- git – very
- grar – grow
- knar – know
- lang – long
- leet – light
- mair – more
- mak – make
- marra – friend, acquaintance
- nak – hurt
- ne – no (determiner)
- neet – night
- neen – none
- nivver – never
- nor – no
- owld – old
- pund – pound
- reet – right
- rund – round
- snar – snow
- spelk – splinter
- spuggy – sparrow
- tak – take
- te – to
- telt – told
- the neet – tonight
- the morra – tomorrow
- tret – treated
- wad – would
- waddent – wouldn’t
- watter – water
- wesh – wash
- wey – well (wey nar = well no)
- whe – who
- whese – whose
- wrang – wrong
- yem – home
- yisterda – yesterday

== See also ==
- Monkey hanger
- Smoggie
- Sandancer

== Bibliography ==
- Pearce, Michael (31 March 2009). "A Perceptual Dialect Map of North East England" (PDF). Journal of English Linguistics. 37 (2): 162–192. doi:10.1177/0075424209334026. S2CID 144694398.
- Pearce, Michael (2012). "Folk accounts of dialect differences in Tyne and Wear". Dialectologia et Geolinguistica. 20 (1): 5–25. doi:10.1515/dialect-2012-0001. S2CID 144961746.
- Burbano-Elizondo, Lourdes (2008). Language variation and identity in Sunderland (PhD). University of Sheffield.
