= Northumbrian burr =

Uvular pronunciation of /r/ in rural far northeast England

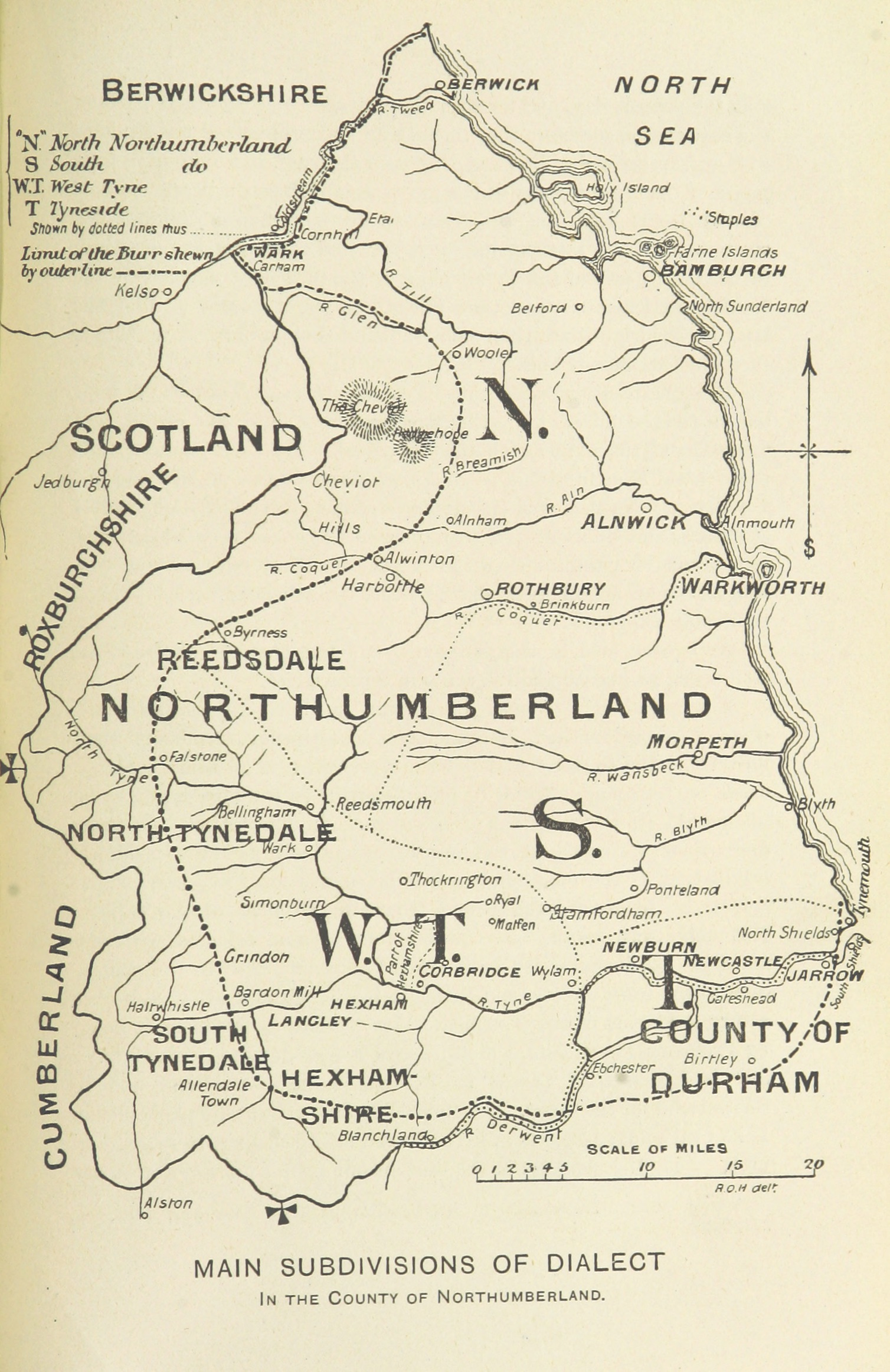
A 19th century dialect map indicating the range of the Northumbrian burr within Northumberland and Durham.

The Northumbrian burr is the distinctive uvular pronunciation of the letter "R" in the traditional dialects of Northumberland, Tyneside ("Geordie") and northern County Durham in England, now remaining only among speakers of rural Northumberland, excluding Tyne and Wear. It is one of the few rhotic dialects left in England.

== Pronunciation ==
According to Påhlsson (1972), the Burr is typically pronounced as a voiced uvular fricative, often with accompanying lip-rounding ([ʁ(ʷ)]). Approximant [ʁ̞], voiceless fricative [χ], tapped [ɢ̆] and trilled [ʀ] uvular pronunciations occur occasionally. The data for Northumberland and northern Durham in the Survey of English Dialects (gathered in the 1950s) suggest that in addition to full pronunciation in syllable onset, uvular /r/ in these dialects was usually maintained in syllable coda position, typically as the uvularization of the preceding vowel.

== Effects on neighbouring sounds ==
The Northumbrian Burr has affected the pronunciation of adjacent vowels, particularly those that precede it, which were subject to 'Burr Modification':

- Påhlsson (1972: 20) notes that "Burr-modified vowels are vowels that have become retracted and lowered (in most cases) due to a following posterior /r/, e.g. 'first' [fɔːst], 'word' [wɔːd]".
- Wells states that "It is the effect of uvular /r/ on a preceding vowel which has historically given rise to forms such as [bɔʶːdz] birds, [wɔʶːmz] worms in Northumberland: the [ʁ] has not only coalesced with the vowel, making it uvularized, but has also caused it to be retracted from centre to back".
- One effect of Burr Modification was the development of the nurse–north merger in dialects of English in northeast England.

In addition, Harold Orton reported that the Burr caused retraction of following alveolar consonants to post-alveolar or retroflex position.

== History ==
Since uvular R is not typical of other English dialects, it may be assumed that this pronunciation is an innovation in the northeast of England. When it occurred and whether the development is connected with the spread of guttural R throughout much of Western Europe are both unknown.

Richard Oliver Heslop refers to the suggestion by James Murray that the Burr originated in the speech of Harry Hotspur which Shakespeare, in King Henry IV, Part 2, describes as peculiar in some way:

Stuck upon him as the sun
In the grey vault of heaven: and by his light,
Did all the chivalry of England move
To do brave acts; he was indeed the glass
Wherein the noble youth did dress themselves,
He had no legs, that practis’d not his gait:
And speaking thick, which nature made his blemish,
Became the accents of the valiant;
For those that could speak low, and tardily,
Would turn their own affection to abuse,
To seem like him: so that, in speech, and gait,
In diet, in affections of delight,
In military rules, humours of blood,
He was the mark and glass, copy and book,
That fashioned others.

Helsop noted, "Whether the tradition originated in this description; or whether Shakespeare gives expression to a tradition current in his time, is yet a matter for investigation."

However, Shakespeare's text does not indicate specifically what was distinctive about Hotspur's speech, and this may be unconnected to the Northumbrian Burr entirely.

The first definite reference to distinctive pronunciation of R in Northeastern England was made by Hugh Jones in 1724, slightly predating the more well known description of it by Daniel Defoe, who wrote, in his A tour thro' the Whole Island of Great Britain, that:

I must not quit Northumberland without taking notice, that the Natives of this Country, of the antient original Race or Families, are distinguished by a Shibboleth upon their Tongues in pronouncing the letter R, which they cannot utter without a hollow Jarring in the Throat, by which they are as plainly known, as a Foreigner is in pronouncing the Th: this they call the Northumberland R, or Wharle; and the Natives value themselves upon that Imperfection, because, forsooth, it shews the Antiquity of their Blood.

Around the turn of the 20th century, the Burr was recorded by Alexander J. Ellis and by Joseph Wright. Ellis said that the Burr was also known as the [kʁʊp]. He divided his sites in Northumberland and north Durham into "Burr Strong", "Burr Weak" and "No Burr".

In the 20th century, it was recorded throughout much of the Northeast in the Orton Corpus.

== Audio recordings ==
Audio recordings were made in the 1950s for the Survey of English Dialects which feature the Northumbrian Burr, all of which are publicly available from the British Library and the University of Leeds:

- Wark
- Thropton
- Lowick
- Earsdon
- Embleton

== Current status ==
The Northumbrian Burr, like many traditional dialect features in England, has largely disappeared from the dialects of northeast England, and it is no longer found in Tyneside English. Nevertheless, some older speakers, especially in northern Northumberland, still use it regularly.

== See also ==
- Pitmatic
- Sierra Leonean English
