= English language in Northern England =

Northern England English
- Northern English
- Region: Northern England
- Language family: Indo-European: Germanic; West Germanic; Ingvaeonic; Anglo-Frisian; Anglic; Anglian; North Anglic; Northern England English
- Writing system: English alphabet

Language codes
- ISO 639-3: –
- Glottolog: nort3299 Northern English
- How the vowel sound in sun varies across England. The thick lines are isoglosses. Northern English dialects have not undergone the FOOT–STRUT split, distinguishing them from Southern English and Scottish dialects.

The spoken English language in Northern England has been shaped by the region's history of settlement and migration, and today encompasses a group of related accents and dialects known as Northern England English or Northern English.

The strongest influence on modern varieties of Northern English was the Northumbrian dialect of Middle English. Additional influences came from contact with Old Norse during the Viking Age; with Irish English following the Great Famine, particularly in Lancashire and the south of Yorkshire; and with Midlands dialects since the Industrial Revolution. All these produced new and distinctive styles of speech.

Traditional dialects are associated with many of the historic counties of England, and include those of Cumbria, Lancashire, Northumbria, and Yorkshire. Following urbanisation in the nineteenth and twentieth centuries, distinctive dialects arose in many urban centres in Northern England, with English spoken using a variety of distinctive pronunciations, terms, and expressions. Northern English accents are often stigmatised, and some native speakers modify their Northern speech characteristics in corporate and professional environments.

There is some debate about how spoken varieties of English have affected written English in Northern England; furthermore, representing a dialect or accent in writing is not straightforward.

== Definition ==
The varieties of English spoken across modern Great Britain form an accent and dialect continuum, and there is no agreed definition of which varieties are Northern, and no consensus about what constitutes "the North".

Wells uses a broad definition of the linguistic North, comprising all accents that have not undergone the TRAP–BATH and FOOT–STRUT splits. On that basis, the isogloss between North and South runs from the River Severn to The Wash, and covers the entire North of England (which Wells divides into "Far North" and "Middle North") and most of the Midlands, including the distinctive Brummie (Birmingham) and Black Country dialects.

In his seminal study of English dialects, Alexander J. Ellis defined the border between the North and the Midlands as that where the word house is pronounced with u: to the north. For Ellis, "the North" occupied the area northwards of a line running from the Humber Estuary on the east coast to the River Lune on the west (more recently, some linguists refer to the River Ribble, slightly further south).

According to Wells, although well-suited to historical analysis, Ellis's line does not reflect everyday usage, which does not consider Manchester or Leeds, both located south of the line, as part of the Midlands.

An alternative approach is to define the linguistic North as equivalent to the cultural area of Northern England – approximately the seven historic counties of Cheshire, Cumberland, County Durham, Lancashire, Northumberland, Westmorland and Yorkshire, or the three modern statistical regions of North East England, North West England and Yorkshire and the Humber. This approach was taken by the Survey of English Dialects (SED), which used the historic counties (minus Cheshire) as a basis, and grouped Manx English with Northern dialects. Under Wells' scheme, the SED's definition includes Far North and Middle North dialects but excludes those of the Midlands.

Scottish English is distinct from Northern English, although the two have interacted with and influenced each other.

== History ==
Many historical northern dialects reflect the influence of Old Norse. In addition to previous contact with Vikings, during the 9th and 10th centuries most of northern and eastern England was part of either the Danelaw or the Danish-controlled Kingdom of Northumbria (except for much of present-day Cumbria, which was part of the Kingdom of Strathclyde). Consequently, modern Yorkshire dialects, in particular, are considered to have been influenced heavily by Old West Norse (the ancestor of Norwegian) and Old East Norse (the ancestor of Swedish and Danish).

In the 19th century, there was large-scale migration from Ireland to Northern England, particularly to Liverpool and its hinterland. Summarising the views of several scholars, Wales (2006) highlights some features of accents and dialects in the North West influenced by Hiberno-English, such as the dental articulation of dat ("that") and tree ("three"), and the usage of yous as the second-person plural pronoun.

== Northern accent and dialect varieties ==
Varieties include:

- Cheshire dialect
- Cumbrian dialect
- Geordie – spoken in Newcastle and Tyneside, which includes southern parts of Northumberland
- Lancashire dialect
- Mackem – in Sunderland and Wearside
- Mancunian – in Manchester, Salford, various other areas of Greater Manchester, and parts of Lancashire and eastern Cheshire
- Northumbrian dialect
- Pitmatic – two varieties: one in the former mining communities of County Durham, the other in Northumberland
- Scouse – in Liverpool and Merseyside, with varieties in western Cheshire and southern Lancashire
- Smoggie – in Teesside
- Yorkshire dialect.

A survey published in 2022 found that compared to the findings of the Survey of English Dialects carried out in the first half of the twentieth century, the edges of many dialect regions have shifted. Furthermore, there are transitional zones between dialects where towns, such as those between Manchester and Liverpool, may display considerable heterogeneity. The authors also found evidence of dialect regions crossing county boundaries.

General Northern English (GNE) refers to a newer "pan-regional standard accent" emerging from dialect leveling and the "reduction of accent variation" found in Northern England. GNE is associated with educated urbanites. A 2020 study sampling 105 accents from Leeds, Liverpool, Manchester, Newcastle upon Tyne and Sheffield discovered a "considerable degree of leveling, especially between Manchester, Leeds and Sheffield, although some differences persist."

== Phonological characteristics ==
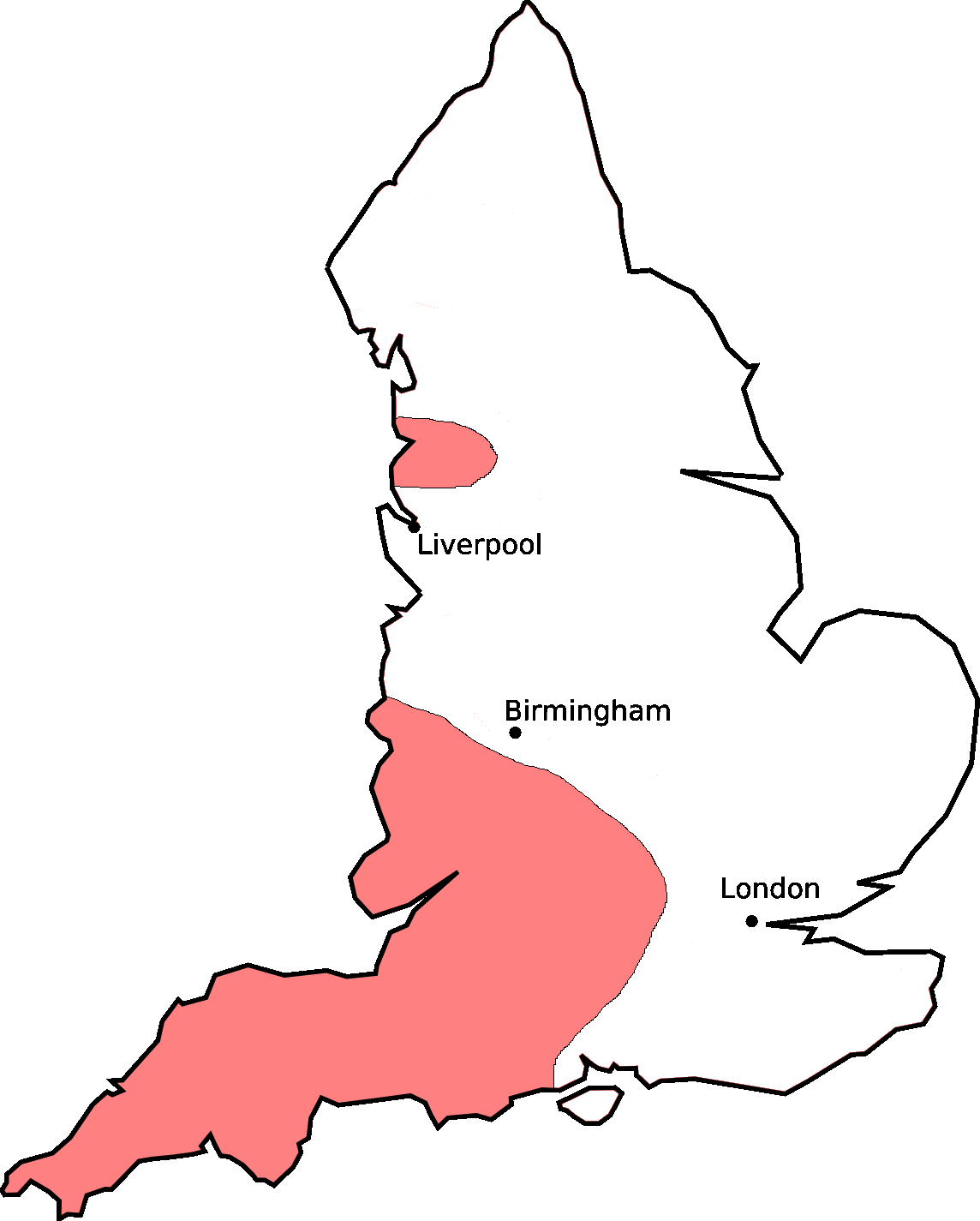
Red areas are where English dialects of the late 20th century were rhotic; in the North, only some of Lancashire is included.

Pronunciation of [ŋg] in the word tongue throughout England; the major Northern counties with this trait are located where the North West and West Midlands meet.

=== Speech features ===
There are several speech features that unite most of the accents of Northern England and distinguish them from Southern England and Scottish accents.

==== Trap–bath split ====
The accents of Northern England generally do not have the trap–bath split observed in Southern England English, so that the vowel in bath, ask and cast is the short TRAP vowel /a/: /baθ, ask, kast/, rather than /ɑː/ found in the south. There are a few words in the BATH set like can't, shan’t, half, calf, rather which are pronounced with /ɑː/ in most Northern English accents as opposed to /æ/ in Northern American accents. The /æ/ vowel of cat, trap is normally pronounced [a] in Standard Southern British, rather than the [æ] found in traditional Received Pronunciation or General American, while /ɑː/, as in the words palm, cart, start, tomato, may not be differentiated from /æ/ by quality, but by length, being pronounced as a longer [aː].

==== Foot–strut split ====
The foot–strut split is absent in Northern English, so that, for example, cut and put rhyme and are both pronounced with /ʊ/; words like love, up, tough, judge, etc. also use this vowel sound. This has led to Northern England being described "Oop North" /ʊp nɔːθ/ by some in the south of England. Some words with /ʊ/ in RP even have /uː/ – book is pronounced /buːk/ in some Northern accents (particularly in Lancashire, Greater Manchester and eastern parts of Merseyside where the Lancashire accent is still prevalent), while conservative accents also pronounce look and cook as /luːk/ and /kuːk/.

==== Other vowels ====
The Received Pronunciation phonemes /eɪ/ (as in face) and /əʊ/ (as in goat) are often pronounced as monophthongs (such as [eː] and [oː]), or as older diphthongs (such as /ɪə/ and /ʊə/). However, the quality of these vowels varies considerably across the region, and this is considered a greater indicator of a speaker's social class than the less stigmatised aspects listed above.

In most areas, happy-tensing has not occurred; the unstressed vowel at the end of words such happy, coffee and taxi is pronounced [ɪ], like the i in bit, and not [i]. This was also the norm in RP until the late 20th century. The tenser [i], similar to Southern England and Standard Southern British, is found throughout the North East from Teesside northwards, and in the Merseyside and Hull areas.

The /ɒ/ vowel of LOT is a fully open [ɒ] rather than the open-mid [ɔ] of Standard Southern British and Southern England English.

==== R sound ====
The most common R sound, when pronounced in Northern England, is the typical English postalveolar approximant; however, an alveolar tap is also widespread, particularly following a consonant or between vowels. This tap predominates most fully in the Scouse accent. The North, like most of the South, is largely (and increasingly) non-rhotic, meaning that R is pronounced only before a vowel or between vowels, but not after a vowel (for instance, in words like car, fear, and lurk). However, regions that are rhotic (pronouncing all R sounds) or somewhat rhotic are possible, particularly amongst older speakers:

- Lancashire and Greater Manchester areas north of the city of Manchester may residually be rhotic or pre-consonantally rhotic (pronouncing R before a consonant but not in word-final position), for example, in Accrington and Rochdale.
- Lincolnshire may weakly retain word-final (but not pre-consonantal) rhoticity.
- Uvular rhoticity, in which the same R sound as in French and German is used, has been described as the traditional "burr" of rural, northern Northumberland – possible as well, though also rare, in County Durham.

==== Other features ====
The North does not have the clear distinction between the "clear L" and "dark L" common to most other accents in England; most Northern accents pronounce all L sounds with a moderate amount of velarization. Exceptions to this are in Tyneside, Wearside and Northumberland, where L is clear, and in Lancashire and Manchester, where L is dark. (Note: Note that this source incorrectly transcribes the dark L with the symbol ⟨ɬ⟩, i.e. as if it were the voiceless alveolar lateral fricative.)

Some northern English speakers have noticeable rises in their intonation: to other speakers of English, they may sound "perpetually surprised or sarcastic."

=== Distinctive sounds ===
Major distinctive sounds of Northern English
English diaphoneme	Example words	Manchester (Mancunian)	Lancashire	Yorkshire	Cumbria	Northumberland (Pitmatic)	Merseyside (Scouse)	Tyneside (Geordie)
/æ/	bath, dance, trap	[a~ä]						
/ɑː/	bra, calm, father	[aː~äː]					[äː~ɑː]	[ɑː~ɒː]
/aɪ/	fight, ride, try	[aɪ~äɪ] Geordie and Northumberland, when not final or before a voiced fricative: [ɛɪ~əɪ]						
/aʊ/	brown, mouth	[aʊ]	[æʊ]	[aʊ~æʊ]		[ɐʊ]	[æʊ]	[ɐʊ~u:]
/eɪ/	lame, rein, stain	[ɛɪ~e̞ɪ]	[e̞ː] Lancashire, Cumbria, and Yorkshire, when before ght as in weight: [eɪ~ɛɪ]				[eɪ]	[ɪə~eː]
/ɛ/	bed, egg, bread	[ɛ]						
/ɛər/	fair, hare, there	[ɛː]	[ɜː(ɹ)~ɛː(ɹ)] South Lancashire: [ɜː(ɹ)] North Lancashire: [ɛː(ɹ)]	[ɛː] some places by the Scottish border: [ɛːɹ]			[eː] (square–nurse merger)	[ɛː]
/ɜːr/	fur, her, stir	[ɜː] rhotic Lancashire: [ɜːɹ]		[ɜː~ɛː] East Riding of Yorkshire: [ɛː~ɜː] rest of Yorkshire: [ɜː]	[ɜː] some places by the Scottish border: [ɜːɹ]		[eː] (square–nurse merger)	[øː~ʊː]
/ər/	doctor, martyr, smaller	[ə~ɜ~ɛ] rhotic Lancashire and some places by the Scottish border: [əɹ~ɜɹ]; also, Geordie: [ɛ~ɐ]						
/iː/	beam, marine, fleece	[ɪi]				[i]	[iː~ɨ̞i]	[iː~ei]
/i/	city, honey, parties	[ɪ~e]		[ɪ~e~i] Hull and northern North Yorkshire: [i] rest of Yorkshire: [ɪ~e]	[ɪi~i]		[i]	
/ɪər/	beer, fear, here	[ɪə̯~iː.ə] rhotic Lancashire and some places by the Scottish border: [ɪə̯ɹ~iː.əɹ]					[iɛ̯]	[iɐ̯]
/ɔː/	all, bought, saw	[ɒː~ɔː]	[ɒː~ɔː]				[o̞:]	
/ɔːr/	horse, north, war	[ɒː~ɔː]	[ɒː~ɔː] rhotic Lancashire and some places by the Scottish border: [ɒːɹ~ɔːɹ]				[o̞:]	
/ɔːr/	hoarse, force, wore	[ɔː] (possible horse-hoarse distinction)	[ɒː~ɔː] rhotic Lancashire and some places by the Scottish border: [ɒːɹ~ɔːɹ]				[o̞:]	
/oʊ/	goal, shown, toe	[ɔʊ~ɔo]	[oː~ɔː~ɵː] West Yorkshire, more commonly: [ɔː] Hull, especially female: [ɵː]				[ɔu~ɜu~ɛʉ]	[ʊə~oː]
/ʌ/	bus, flood, put	[ʊ] (no foot–strut split) Northumberland, less rounded: [ʌ̈]; in Scouse, Manchester, South Yorkshire and (to an extent) Teesside the word one is uniquely pronounced with the vowel [ɒ], and this is also possible for once, among(st), none, tongue, and nothing						
/ʊ/	bus, flood, put	[ʊ] (no foot–strut split) Northumberland, less rounded: [ʌ̈]; in Scouse, Manchester, South Yorkshire and (to an extent) Teesside the word one is uniquely pronounced with the vowel [ɒ], and this is also possible for once, among(st), none, tongue, and nothing						
/ʊər/	poor, sure, tour	[ʊə̯~uː.ə] rhotic Lancashire and some places by the Scottish border: [ʊə̯ɹ~uː.əɹ]					[o̞:]	[uɐ]
/uː/	food, glue, lose	[ʏː]	[ʊu] North Yorkshire: [ʉ:]		[ʉː]	[yː]	[ʉː]	[ʉu~ʊu~ɵʊ]
/ɒ/	lot, wasp, cough	[ɒ]						
intervocalic & postvocalic /k/	racquet, joker, luck	[k] or [k~x]	[k]				[k~x] or [k~ç]	[k~kˀ]
initial /h/	hand, head, home	[∅] or [h]						[h]
/l/	lie, mill, salad	[l~ɫ] /l/ is often somewhat "dark" (meaning velarised) [ɫ] throughout northern England, but it is particularly dark in Manchester and Lancashire.						[l]
stressed-syllable /ŋ/	bang, singer, wrong	[ŋg~ŋ] [ŋ] predominates in the northern half of historical Lancashire		[ŋ] [ŋg] predominates only in South Yorkshire's Sheffield			[ŋg~ŋ]	[ŋ]
post-consonantal & intervocalic /r/	current, three, pray	[ɹ] or, conservatively, [ɹ~ɾ] [ʁ] in Lindisfarne and traditional, rural, northern Northumberland					[ɾ]	[ɹ~ɾ]
intervocalic, final & pre-consonantal /t/	attic, bat, fitness	[ʔ] or [t(ʰ)]					[θ̠] or [ʔ]	

== Grammar and syntax ==
In general, the grammatical patterns of Northern English are similar to those of British English. However, Northern English has several unique characteristics.

=== Northern Subject Rule ===
Under the Northern Subject Rule, the suffix "-s", which in Standard English grammar only appears in the third-person singular present, is attached to verbs in many present- and past-tense forms (leading to, for example, "the birds sings"). More generally, third-person singular forms of irregular verbs, such as to be, may be used with plurals and other grammatical persons; for instance "the lambs is out". In modern dialects, the most obvious manifestation is a levelling of the past-tense verb-forms was and were. Either may dominate depending on the region and individual speech patterns (so some Northern speakers may say "I was" and "You was", while others prefer "I were" and "You were"). Furthermore, in many dialects, especially in the far North, weren't is treated as the negation of was.

=== Epistemic mustn't ===
The "epistemic mustn't", where mustn't is used to mark deductions such as "This mustn't be true", is largely restricted within the British Isles to Northern England, although it is more widely accepted in American English, and is likely inherited from Scottish English. A few other Scottish traits are also found in far Northern dialects, such as double modal verbs (might could instead of might be able to), but these are restricted in their distribution and are mostly dying out.

=== Pronouns ===
While standard English now only has a single second-person pronoun, you, many Northern dialects have additional pronouns either retained from earlier forms or introduced from other variants of English.

The pronouns thou and thee have survived in many rural Northern dialects. In some case, these allow the distinction between formality and familiarity to be maintained, while in others thou is a generic second-person singular, and you (or ye) is restricted to the plural. Even when thou has died out, second-person plural pronouns are common. In the more rural dialects and those of the far North, this is typically ye, while in cities and areas of the North West with historical Irish communities, this is more likely to be yous.

Conversely, the process of "pronoun exchange" means that many first-person pronouns can be replaced by the first-person objective plural us (or more rarely we or wor) in standard constructions. These include me (so "give me" becomes "give us"), we (so "we Geordies" becomes "us Geordies") and our (so "our cars" becomes "us cars"). The latter especially is a distinctively Northern trait.

Almost all British vernaculars have regularised reflexive pronouns, but the resulting form of the pronouns varies from region to region. In Yorkshire and the North East, hisself and theirselves are preferred to himself and themselves. Other areas of the North have regularised the pronouns in the opposite direction, with meself used instead of myself. This appears to be a trait inherited from Irish English, and like Irish speakers, many Northern speakers use reflexive pronouns in non-reflexive situations for emphasis. Depending on the region, reflexive pronouns can be pronounced (and often written) as if they ended -sen, -sel or -self (even in plural pronouns) or ignoring the suffix entirely.

== Vocabulary ==
Very few terms from Brittonic languages have survived, with the exception of place-name elements (especially in Cumbria) and, by some accounts, the Yan Tan Tethera counting system, traditionally used in counting stitches in knitting, counting-out games, nursery rhymes, and, reputedly, counting sheep. However, the most likely source for this is Wales in the post-medieval period.

In some Northern English dialects, the forms yan and yen used to mean one, as in someyan ("someone") or that yan ("that one"): Griffiths (2004) notes that "OE án (with long vowel) remained 'an' in the North, with the 'a' breaking to 'ia', 'ie', etc."

A corpus study of Late Modern English texts from or set in Northern England found lad ("boy" or "young man") and lass ("girl" or "young woman") were the most widespread "pan-Northern" dialect terms. Other terms in the top ten included a set of three indefinite pronouns owt ("anything"), nowt ("naught" or "nothing") and summat ("something"), the Anglo-Scottish bairn, bonny and gang, and sel/sen ("self") and mun ("must"). Regional dialects within Northern England also had many unique terms, and canny ("clever") and nobbut ("nothing but") were both common in the corpus, despite being limited to the North East and to the North West and Yorkshire respectively.

== See also ==
- English language in Southern England – Accents and dialects of modern-day southern England
- Northern Subject Rule – Distinctive feature of Northern English and Scots
- Scottish English – Variety of English spoken in Scotland
