= Cumbrian dialect =

English dialect of northwestern England

- Native to: England
- Region: Cumbria
- Ethnicity: English
- Language family: Indo-European: Germanic; West Germanic; North Sea Germanic; Anglo-Frisian; Anglic; Anglian; North Anglic; Northern English; Cumbrian dialect
- Early forms: Northumbrian Old English: Northern Middle English

Language codes
- ISO 639-3: –
- IETF: en-u-sd-gbcma
- Cumbria within England
- Coordinates: 54°30′N 3°15′W

Cumbrian dialect or Cumberland dialect is a local dialect of Northern England in decline, spoken in Cumberland, Westmorland and Lancashire North of the Sands. Some parts of Cumbria have a more North-East English sound to them. Whilst clearly spoken with a Northern English accent and phonologically closely related to West Riding Yorkshire dialect, the Cumbrian dialect shares much vocabulary with Scots. A Cumbrian Dictionary of Dialect, Tradition and Folklore by William Rollinson, as well as a more contemporary and lighthearted Cumbrian Dictionary and Phrase Book enumerate certain local words and sayings.

== History of the dialect ==
=== Northumbrian origin ===
As with other English dialects north of the Humber–Lune Line and the closely related Scots language, Cumbrian is descended from Northern Middle English and in turn Northumbrian Old English. Old English was introduced to Cumbria from Northumbria, where it was initially spoken alongside the native Cumbric language.

=== Celtic influence ===
Despite the modern county being created only in 1974 from the counties of Cumberland, Westmorland and north Lancashire and parts of Yorkshire, Cumbria is an ancient division. Before the arrival of the Romans, the area was the home of the Carvetii tribe, which was later assimilated to the larger Brigantes tribe. These people would have spoken Brythonic, which developed into Old Welsh, but around the 5th century AD, when Cumbria was the centre of the kingdom of Rheged, the language spoken in northern England and southern Scotland from Lancashire and Yorkshire to Strathclyde had developed into a dialect of Brythonic known as Cumbric (the scarcity of linguistic evidence, however, means that Cumbric's distinctness from Old Welsh is more deduced than proven). Remnants of Brythonic and Cumbric are most often seen in place names, in elements such as caer 'fort' as in Carlisle, pen 'hill' as in Penrith, glinn 'valley' and redïn 'ferns, bracken' as in Glenridding, and craig 'crag, rock' as in High Crag.

The most well known Celtic element in Cumbrian dialect is the sheep counting numerals which are still used in various forms by shepherds throughout the area, and apparently for knitting. The word 'Yan' (meaning 'one'), for example, is prevalent throughout Cumbria and is still often used, especially by non-speakers of 'received pronunciation' and children, e.g. "That yan owr there," or "Can I have yan of those?"

The Northern subject rule may be attributable to Celtic Influence.

Before the 8th century AD Cumbria was annexed to English Northumbria and Old English began to be spoken in parts, although evidence suggests Cumbric survived in central regions in some form until the 11th century.

=== Norse influence ===
A far stronger influence on the modern dialect was Old Norse, spoken by Norse and/or Norse-Gael settlers who probably arrived on the coasts of Cumbria in the 10th century via Ireland and the Isle of Man. Many Cumbrian place names in or near coastal areas are of Norse origin, including Ulverston from Ulfrs tun ('Ulfr's farmstead'), Kendal from Kent dalr ('valley of the River Kent') and Elterwater from eltr vatn ('swan lake'). Many of the traditional dialect words are also remnants of Norse influence, including beck (bekkr, 'stream'), laik (leik, 'to play'), lowp (hlaupa, 'to jump') and glisky (gliskr, 'shimmering').

Once Cumbrians had assimilated to speaking Northumbrian English, there were few further influences on the dialect. In the Middle Ages, much of Cumbria frequently swapped hands between England and Scotland but this had little effect on the language used. In the nineteenth century miners from Cornwall and Wales began relocating to Cumbria to take advantage of the work offered by new iron ore, copper and wadd mines but whilst they seem to have affected some local accents (notably Barrow-in-Furness) they don't seem to have contributed much to the vocabulary.

The earliest recordings of the dialect were in a book published by Agnes Wheeler in 1790. The Westmoreland dialect in three familiar dialogues, in which an attempt is made to illustrate the provincial idiom. There were four editions of the book. Her work was later used in Specimens of the Westmorland Dialect published by the Revd Thomas Clarke in 1887.

One of the lasting characteristics still found in the local dialect of Cumbria today is definite article reduction. Unlike the Lancashire dialect, where 'the' is abbreviated to 'th', in Cumbrian (as in Yorkshire and south Durham) the sound is harder and in sentences sounds as if it is attached to the previous word, for example "int" instead of "in the" "ont" instead of "on the".

== Accent and pronunciation ==
Non-native speaker describing and using Cumbrian dialect.

Cumbria is a large area with several relatively isolated districts, so there is quite a large variation in accent, especially between north and south or the coastal towns. There are some uniform features that should be taken into account when pronouncing dialect words.

=== Vowels ===
RP English	Cumbrian
/æ/ as in 'bad'	[a]
/ɑː/ as in 'bard'	[aː]
/aʊ/ as in 'house'	[uː] (North only)
/eɪ/ as in 'bay'	[ɪə] in the North-East, and [eː] elsewhere
/eə/ as in 'bear'	[ɛː]
/aɪ/ as in 'bide'	[ɐː] (South), [eɪ] (North)
/əʊ/ as in 'boat'	[oː]
/ʌ/ as in 'bud'	[ʊ]
/uː/ as in 'boo'	[əu], [ɪu] or [uː]

When certain vowels are followed by /l/, an epenthetic schwa [ə] is often pronounced between them, creating two distinct syllables:

- 'feel' > [ˈfiəl]
- 'fool' > [ˈfuəl]
- 'fail' > [ˈfɪəl]
- 'file' > [ˈfaɪəl]

The pronunciation of moor and poor is a traditional feature of Received Pronunciation but is now associated with some old-fashioned speakers. It is generally more common in the north of England than in the south. The words cure, pure, sure may be pronounced with a triphthong [ɪuə].

=== Consonants ===
Most consonants are pronounced as they are in other parts of the English speaking world. A few exceptions follow:

⟨g⟩ and ⟨k⟩ have a tendency to be dropped or unreleased in the coda (word- or syllable-finally). This can sometimes occur in the onset as well in words such as finger.

⟨h⟩ is realised in various ways throughout the county. When William Barrow Kendall wrote his Furness Wordbook in 1867, he wrote that ⟨h⟩ 'should never be dropped', suggesting the practice had already become conspicuous. It seems the elision of both ⟨h⟩ and ⟨t⟩ began in the industrial towns and slowly spread out. In the south, it is now very common.

⟨l⟩ in the word final position may be dropped or realised as [w]: woo wool [ˈwəw]; pow pole [ˈpɒw].

⟨r⟩ is realised as [ɾ] following consonants and in word-initial position but is often elided in the coda, unless a following word begins with a vowel: ross [ˈɾɒs]; gimmer [ˈɡɪmə]; gimmer hogg [ˈɡɪməɾ‿ɒɡ].

⟨t⟩ is traditionally always pronounced as a voiceless alveolar plosive, although in many places it has been replaced by the glottal stop [ʔ] now common throughout Britain.

⟨y⟩ may be consonantal [j] as in yam home [ˈjam]. As the adjectival or adverbial suffix -y it may be [ɪ] or [iː] as in clarty (muddy) [ˈklaːtɪ]. Medially and, in some cases, finally it is [ɐː] as in Thorfinsty (a place) [ˈθɔːfɪnstɐː].

Finally, in some parts of the county, there is a tendency to palatalize the consonant cluster ⟨cl⟩ in word-initial and medial position, thereby rendering it as something more closely approaching [tl]. As a result, some speakers pronounce clarty (muddy) as [ˈtlaːtɪ], "clean" as [ˈtliːn], and "likely" and "lightly" may be indistinguishable.

=== Stress ===
Stress is usually placed on the initial syllable: yakeren "acorn" [ˈjakɜɾən].

Unstressed initial vowels are usually fully realised, whilst those in final syllables are usually reduced to schwa [ə].

== Dialect words ==
=== General words ===
- aye (pronounced eye) yes
- thee's / thou's / thine yours
- thee / thou you (singular)
- yous / thous you (plural)
- yat gate
- us, es me
- our mine
- where’s t’... where is the...
- deùin doing (as in 'whut ye deùin? - what are you doing?)
- divn't don't (as in 'divn't do that, lad')
- hoo'doo How are you doing? (strain of 'How do?')
- canna can't (as in 'ye canna deù that!' - 'You can't do that!')
- cannae can't (more typically Scottish, but used throughout the North)
- deù do
- frae from
- yon that (when referring to a noun which is visible at the time)
- reet Right
- (h)areet All right? (Greeting)
- be reet It'll be all right or “it’d be right” when referring to something somewhat negative
- nèa No
- yonder there (as in 'ower yonder')
- owt aught; anything (got owt? - got anything?)
- nowt naught; nothing (owt for nowt - something for nothing)
- bevvie drink (alcoholic)
- eh? what/ isn't it? (that's good eh?)
- yan/yā One

=== Adjectives ===
- clarty messy, muddy
- kaylied intoxicated
- kystie squeamish or fussy
- lāl small
- oal old. "T'oal fella" dad, old man
- ladgeful embarrassing or unfashionable
- slape slippery or smooth as in slape back collie, a border collie with short wiry hair
- yon used when indicating a place or object that is usually in sight but far away. abbreviation of yonder.

=== Adverbs ===
- barrie good
- geet/gurt very
- gey very
- ower/ovver over/enough ("Aa’s gān ower yonder for a kip" - I'm going over there for a sleep)
- sec/sic such
- vanna/vanya almost, nearly.

=== Nouns ===
- attercop spider
- bab'e/bairn baby
- bait packed meal that is carried to work
- bait bag bag in which to carry bait
- bar pound (money) (used in Carlisle and occasionally in West Cumberland)
- biddies fleas or head lice or old people "old biddies"
- bog toilet (Aa’s gān te t’bog / I'm going to the toilet)
- britches trousers (derived from breeches)
- byat boat
- beùts boots (wuk beùts / work boots)
- cack/kack faeces (load a cack)
- tyeble or teàble table
- clout/cluwt punch or hit "Aa’s gan clout thou yan" (I'm going to punch you one); also clout means a cloth
- crack/craic gossip "’ow marra, get some better crack"
- cur dog sheepdog - collie
- ceàk cake
- den toilet
- doilem idiot
- dookers swimming trunks
- fratch argument or squabble
- feàce face
- ginnel a narrow passage
- jinnyspinner a daddy long legs
- kecks trousers/pants or underpants
- keppards ears
- ket/kets sweets
- kebbie a stick
- lewer money
- lugs ears
- mebby maybe
- mockin or kack faeces / turd "I need to have a mockin" (see also above, cack)
- mowdy or mowdywarp a mole (the animal)
- peeve drink (alcoholic)
- push iron or push bike bicycle
- scran food
- scrow a mess
- shillies small stones or gravel
- skemmy or skem beer
- snig small eel
- steàn stone (steàns / stones)
- watter water
- wuk work, as in: Aa’s gān te wuk (I'm going to work)
- yam home, as in: Aa’s gān yam (I'm going home)
- yat gate
- heùk hook ("yuk us a wurm on't heùk" / throw me a worm on the hook)

=== Verbs ===
- beal cry
- bowk retch (as in before vomiting)
- bray beat (as in beat up someone)
- chess chase
- chor steal (Romany origin, cf. Urdu chorna)
- chunder vomit
- clarten messing about
- clout/cluwt hit "I’ll clout ye yan"
- deek look (Romany origin, cf Urdu dekhna)
- doss Idle or skive. To mess about and avoid work
- fettle to fix or mend. ("Aa’s i' bad fettle" - I'm not very well)
- fistle to fidget
- gander look
- gan going to somewhere
- gā go
- gān going
- git go ("gā on, git yam" / go on, go home)
- hoik to pick at or gouge out
- hoy throw
- laik play
- lait look for
- liggin lying down
- lob throw
- lowp jump
- nash run away
- radged broken (radged in the head/mental)
- ratch to search for something
- scop to throw
- scower look at
- shag sexual intercourse
- skit make fun of
- smowk smoking ("Aa’s gān out for a smowk")
- sow sexual intercourse
- twat hit someone ("I twatted him in the feàce")
- twine to whine or complain
- whisht one word command to be quiet
- wukin working
- yit yet ("Aa’s nut gān yam yit" / I’m not going home yet)
- yuk to throw

=== People ===
- bairden/bairn/barn child
- boyo brother/male friend (Carlisle/ West Cumberland)
- buwler/bewer girl/woman/girlfriend
- cus or cuz friend (from cousin) (East Cumberland)
- gammerstang awkward person
- mot woman/girl/girlfriend
- offcomer a non-native in Cumberland
- potter gypsy
- gadgey man
- charva man/friend (West Cumberland, Carlisle)
- marra friend (West Cumberland)
- t'oal fella father
- t'oal lass mother
- our lass wife/girlfriend
- laddo male of unknown name
- lasso female of unknown name
- jam eater used in Whitehaven to describe someone from Workington, and vice versa.

=== Farming terms ===
- boose a division in a shuppon
- byre cow shed
- cop the bank of earth on which a hedge grows
- dyke raised bank, often topped with a hedge. Many small roads are flanked by dykes
- fodder gang passage for feeding cattle (usually in a shuppon)
- kack crap/feces/excrement
- ky cows
- liggin' kessin when an animal is lying on its back and can't get up
- lonnin country lane
- stoop a gate post
- yakka farmer (There is however in some cases a distinction between yakka and farm-yakker)
- yat gate
- yow sheep (ewe)

=== Weather ===
- hossing raining heavily (it's hossing it doon)
- glisky when the sky is really bright so you can't see properly
- mizzlin misty drizzly rain
- syling pouring rain
- gey windy 'appen very windy
- hoyin it doon teeming it down with rain
- yukken it doon (it's throwing it down with rain)
- warm warm (it's gey warm / it's very warm)

=== Places ===
- Barra Barrow
- Cockamuth Cockermouth
- Jam Land, Whitehaven or Workington
- Pereth Penrith
- Kendul Kendal
- Kezik, Kesik Keswick (It is a silent 'w') Norse kǣs / kés 'cheese' and -wik 'farm' or 'settlement'
- Langtoon Longtown
- Merrypoort Maryport
- Mire-Us or My-Rus Mirehouse
- Sanneth Sandwith
- Sloth Silloth
- Spatry / Speeatry Aspatria
- Trepenah, Trappena Torpenhow (Tor, Pen, and How are all words for "hill")
- Wukington, Wukinton, Wukintun, Wukiton, Wukitn, Wuki'n, Wucki'n Workington

=== Phrases ===
- assa marra used by Cumbrians to refer to the Cumbrian dialect
- nivver ivver ‘ave Aa sin owt like it never ever have I seen anything like it
- Aa ‘ope tha's gānna put 'at in yer pocket I hope you're going to put that in your pocket
- Aa’s gān yam I'm going home
- ’ave ye? Have you?
- an what? and what?
- Aa ‘eard yer fatthers wur in't bad fettle I heard your father was in a bad way or not very well
- wher’s thoo off te where are you going
- wh'ista*who ar ye? Who are you? (especially used in Appleby) (H is silent in second version)
- whure ye frae? Where are you from?
- hoos't gān? How is it going? (how are you)
- gān then provoke fight
- what ye deùin? What are you doing?
- where ye off ta? Where are you off to? (Where are you going?)
- Ahreet, mate. All right, mate? (emphasis the A and T a little)
- cought a bug illness
- mint/class/necta Excellent
- lāl lad's in bother that young man is always in trouble
- Tha wants for te git thasel a pint o 'strangba You really ought to be drinking strongbow
- Whoa's boddy Who is that (female)
- Hoo'ista How are you
- Sum reet tidy cluwt oot on tuwn like There are some nice looking girls out
- hasta iver deek't a cuddy loup a 5 bar yat have you ever seen a donkey jump a 5 bar gate
- out t'road not in the way
- shy bairns/barns get nowt shy children get nothing; if you don't ask, you will not receive

== Cumbrian numbers ==
The Cumbrian numbers, often called 'sheep counting numerals' because of their (declining) use by shepherds to this very day, show clear signs that they may well have their origins in Cumbric. The table below shows the variation of the numbers throughout Cumbria, as well as the relevant cognate in Welsh, Cornish and Breton, which are the three geographically closest British languages to Cumbric, for comparison.

	Keswick	Westmorland	Eskdale	Millom	High Furness	Welsh	Cornish	Breton
1	yan	yan	yaena	aina	yan	un	onan/unn	unan/un
2	tyan	tyan	taena	peina	taen	dau/dwy	dew/diw	daou/div
3	tethera	tetherie	teddera	para	tedderte	tri/tair	tri/teyr	tri/teir
4	methera	peddera	meddera	pedera	medderte	pedwar/pedair	peswar/peder	pevar/peder
5	peen	pip	pimp	pimp	pimp	pump	pymp	pemp
6	sethera	teezie	hofa	ithy	haata	chwe(ch)	whegh	c'hwec'h
7	lethera	mithy	lofa	mithy	slaata	saith	seyth	seizh
8	hovera	katra	seckera	owera	lowera	wyth	eth	eizh
9	dovera	hornie	leckera	lowera	dowera	naw	naw	nav
10	dick	dick	dec	dig	dick	deg	dek	dek
15	bumfit	bumfit	bumfit	bumfit	mimph	pymtheg	pymthek	pemzek
20	giggot	-	-	-	-	ugain	ugens	ugent

NB: when these numerals were used for counting sheep, repeatedly, the shepherd would count to fifteen or twenty and then move a small stone from one of his pockets to the other before beginning again, thus keeping score. Numbers eleven, twelve etc. would have been 'yandick, tyandick', while sixteen and seventeen would have been 'yan-bumfit, tyan-bumfit' etc.

Although yan is still widely used, wan is starting to creep into some sociolects of the area.

== Survey of English Dialects sites ==
There were several villages in Cumbria that were used during the Survey of English Dialects to minutely detail localised dialects. At the time, Cumbria did not exist as a unit of local government; there were 12 sites within modern Cumbria spread across four different counties:

- Longtown (Cu1)
- Abbey Town (Cu2)
- Brigham (Cu3)
- Threlkeld (Cu4)
- Hunsonby (Cu5)
- Great Strickland (We1)
- Patterdale (We2)
- Soulby (We3)
- Staveley-in-Kendal (We4)
- Coniston (La1)
- Cartmel (La2)
- Dent (Y5)

== Cumbrian poetry ==
There were several among the well-educated in the 18th century who used dialect in their poetry. One of the earliest was the Rev. Josiah Relph, whose imitations of Theocritan Pastorals self-consciously introduce the demotic for local colour. Although written about 1735, they were not published until after the author's death in A Miscellany of Poems (Wigton, 1747), followed by two further editions in 1797 and 1805. The Rev. Robert Nelson followed him in the same tradition with A choice collection of poems in Cumberland dialect (Sunderland, 1780). Ewan Clark, a contemporary of Nelson's, also wrote a handful of dialect imitations that were included in his Miscellaneous Poems (Whitehaven 1779). Female members of the gentry writing in dialect at this time included Susanna Blamire and her companion Catherine Gilpin. Miss Blamire had written songs in Scots that were set to music by Joseph Haydn. Her work in Cumbrian dialect was less well known and remained uncollected until the publication of The Muse of Cumberland in 1842. This was followed by Songs and Poems, edited by Sidney Gilpin in 1866, in which Miss Gilpin's work also appeared.

In the 19th century appeared a few poems in dialect in the Miscellaneous Poems of John Stagg (Workington, 1804, second edition the following year). Known as 'the Cumbrian Minstrel', he too wrote in Scots and these poems appeared in the new editions of his poems published from Wigton in 1807 and 1808. What seems to have lifted use of Cumbrian dialect from a passing curiosity to a demonstration of regional pride in the hands of labouring class poets was the vogue of Robert Burns, among whose disciples the calico worker Robert Anderson counted himself. His Ballads in the Cumberland Dialect were published from Carlisle in 1805 and were reprinted in several different formats over the following decades. Some of these publications also incorporated the work of his precursors and a few other contemporaries, such as Ewan Clark and Mark Lonsdale. One such collection was Ballads in the Cumberland dialect, chiefly by R. Anderson (1808, second edition 1815, Wigton), and a third from Carlisle in 1823.

A more ambitious anthology of dialect verse, Dialogues, poems, songs, and ballads, by various writers, in the Westmoreland and Cumberland dialects, followed from London in 1839. This contained work by all the poets mentioned already, with the addition of some songs by John Rayson that were later to be included in his Miscellaneous Poems and Ballads (London, 1858). Another anthology of regional writing, Sidney Gilpin's The Songs and Ballads of Cumberland (London, 1866), collects together work in both standard English and dialect by all the poets mentioned so far, as well as Border Ballads, poems by William Wordsworth and family, and other verse of regional interest. Some later poets include John Sewart (Rhymes in the Westmoreland Dialect, Settle, 1869) and Gwordie Greenup (the pseudonym of Stanley Martin), who published short collections in prose and verse during the 1860s and 1870s. A more recent anthology, Oor mak o' toak: an anthology of Lakeland dialect poems, 1747-1946, was published from Carlisle in 1946 by the Lakeland Dialect Society.

== Barrovian Dialect ==
Barrow-in-Furness is unique within Cumbria and the local dialect tends to be more Lancashire orientated. Like Liverpool this is down to the large numbers of settlers from various regions (including predominantly Scotland, elsewhere in England and Ireland amongst other locations). In general the Barrovian dialect tends to drop certain letters (including h and t) for example holiday would be pronounced as 'oliday, and with the drop of the h there is more emphasis on the letter o. The indefinite article used would be 'an'. 'A hospital' becomes an 'ospital. Another example is with the letter t where twenty is often pronounced twen'y (again an emphasis on the n could occur) or twe'y (realised as /ˈtwɛ.ʔɪ/).

== See also ==
- Cumbria
- Cumbric language
- Dialect
- Etymology of Cumbrian place names
- Northumbrian dialect

== Bibliography ==
- Thomas Farrall (1892). Betty Wilson's Cumberland Teals. Carlisle: J. C. Mason.
- Dan Gibson (2012). The GonMad Cumbrian Dictionary & Phrasebook. CreateSpace Independent Publishing Platform. ISBN 978-1481095303.
