= Northumberland and Durham Coalfield =

Coal mining region in north east England

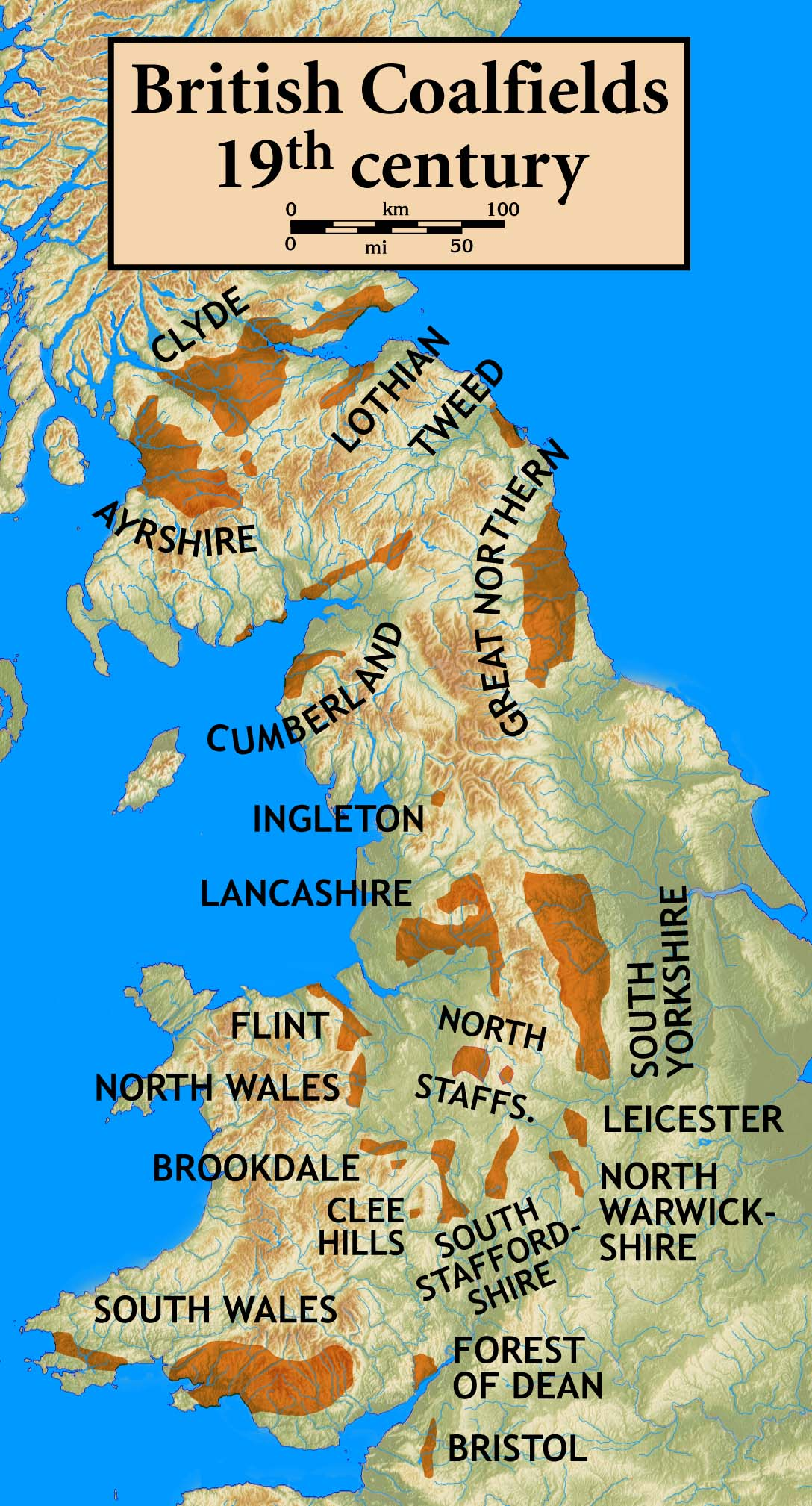

The Northumberland and Durham Coalfield is a coalfield in North East England, otherwise known as the Durham and Northumberland Coalfield or the Great Northern Coalfield. It consists of the Northumberland Coalfield and the Durham Coalfield.
