= Geordie =

Northern English dialect and demonym native to Tyneside

- Tyneside English, Newcastle English
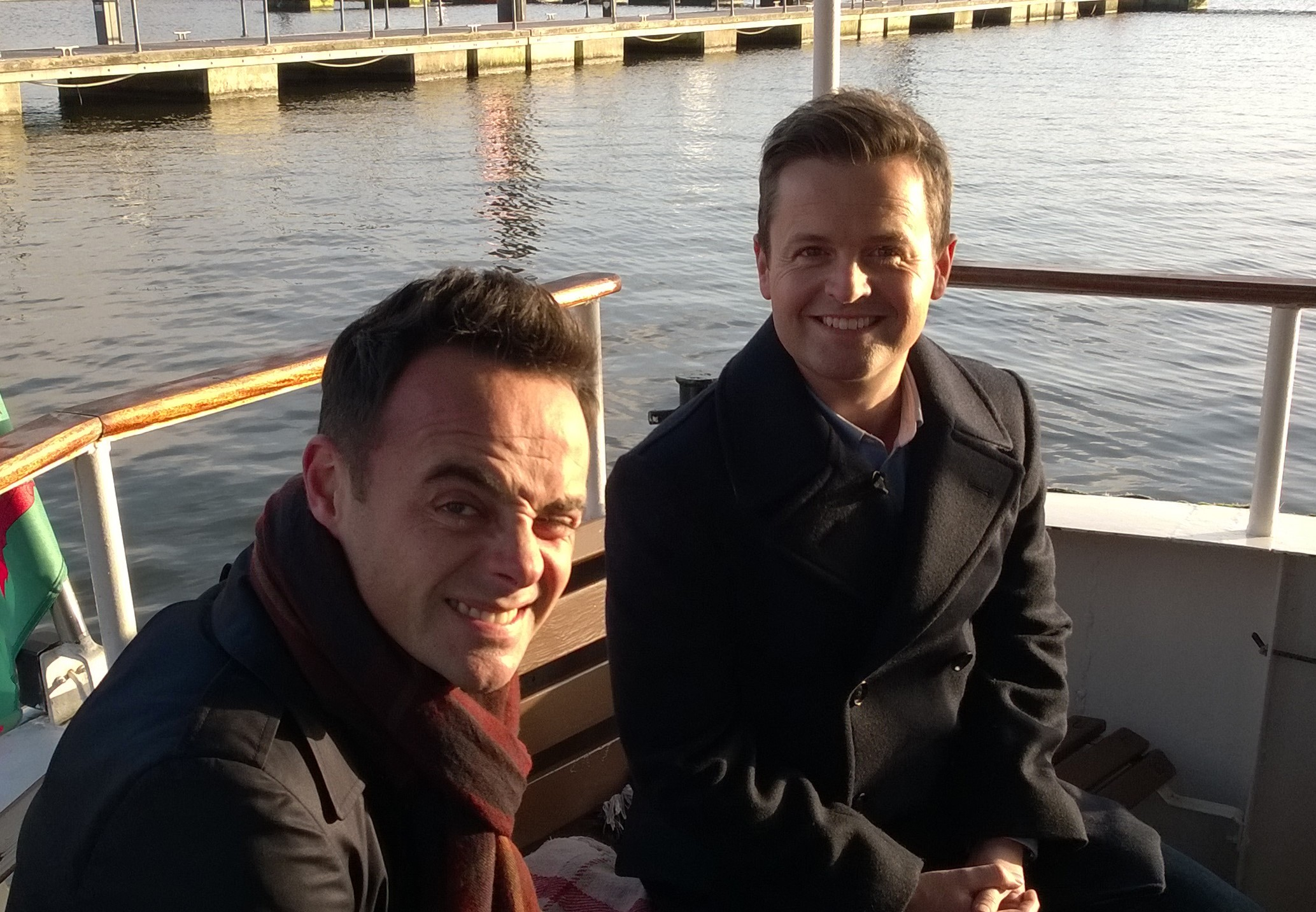
- Television presenters Ant and Dec are Geordies from Newcastle upon Tyne
- Native to: England
- Region: Tyneside
- Language family: Indo-European: Germanic; West Germanic; North Sea Germanic; Anglo-Frisian; Geordie
- Early forms: Old English: Northumbrian Old English; Northern Middle English; Northern Early Modern English

Language codes
- ISO 639-3: –
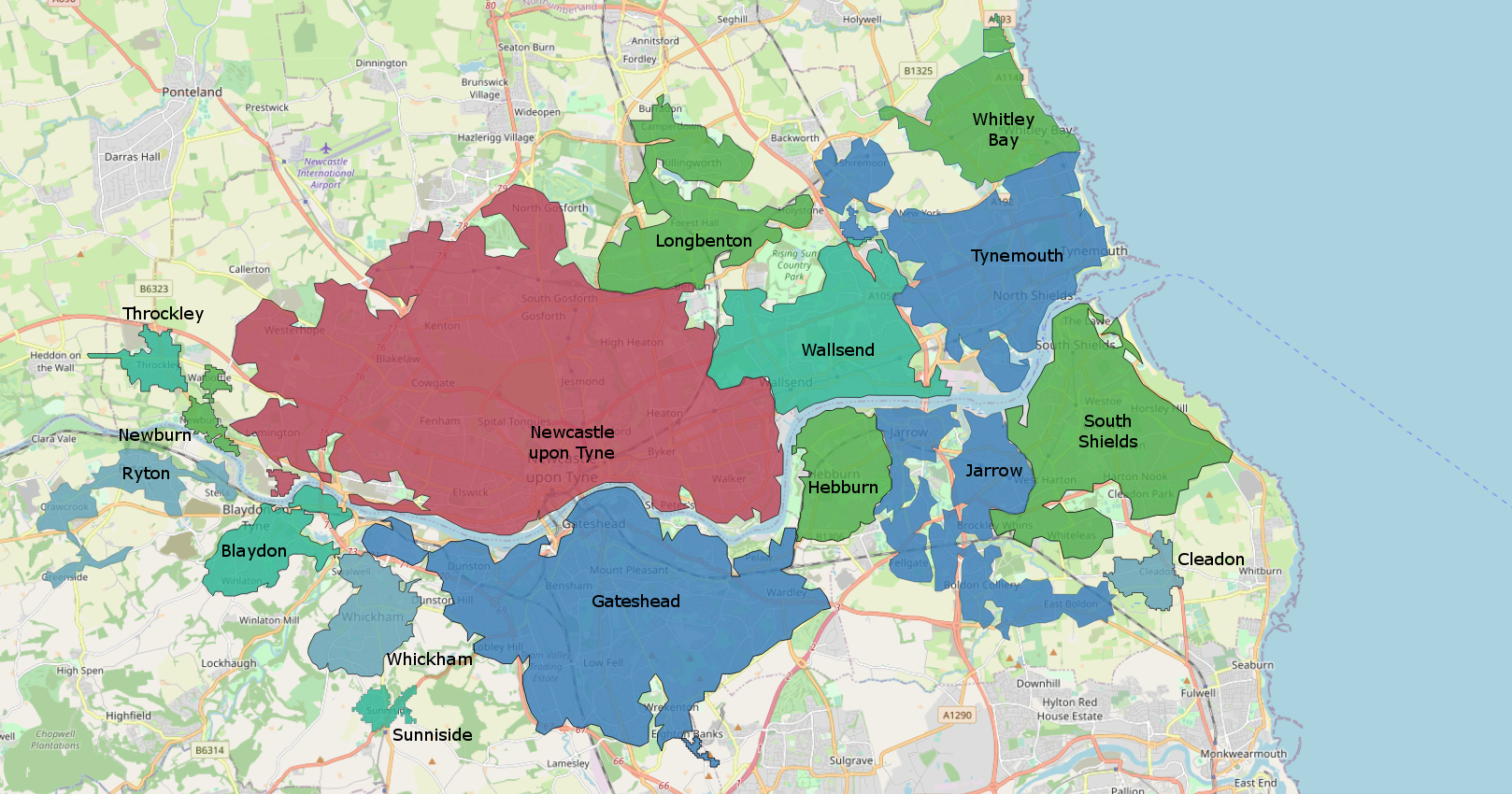
- Map of the Tyneside built up area with Newcastle in red.

Geordie (/ˈdʒɔːrdi/ JOR-dee) is a regional name for, and the vernacular dialect of, the people of Newcastle upon Tyne and the wider Tyneside area of North East England, and sometimes even the adjacent counties of Northumberland and Durham.

The dialect, also known formally as Tyneside English or Newcastle English in linguistics, is one of the major dialects of northern England. It descends from older Northumbrian dialect.

As a regional nickname, applying the term is set by one's definition of or acceptance to being called a Geordie: it varies from supporters of Newcastle United Football Club, the city, Tyneside, Tyne and Wear and to North East England. People from the latter two wider areas are less likely to accept the term as applying to them.

The Geordie dialect is often considered unintelligible to many other native English speakers. The Geordie dialect and identity are perceived as the "most attractive in England", according to a 2008 newspaper survey, amongst the British public and as working-class.

Speech example
An example of a man from Newcastle (Ant McPartlin).

Speech example
An example of a man from Newcastle (Declan Donnelly).

== History ==
Like all English dialects, the Geordie dialect traces back to the Old English spoken by Anglo-Saxon settlers, initially employed by the ancient Celtic Britons who fought Pictish invaders after the end of Roman rule in Britain in the 5th century. The Angles, Saxons, and Jutes who arrived became ascendant politically and culturally over the native British through subsequent migration from tribal homelands along the North Sea coast of mainland Europe. The Anglo-Saxon kingdoms that emerged in the Early Middle Ages spoke largely mutually intelligible varieties of what is now called Old English, each varying somewhat in phonology, morphology, syntax, and lexicon. In Northern England and the Scottish borders, then dominated by the kingdom of Northumbria, there developed a distinct Northumbrian Old English dialect, which preceded modern Geordie. The linguistic conservatism of Geordie means that poems by the Anglo-Saxon scholar the Venerable Bede can be translated more successfully into Geordie than into standard modern English.

The British Library points out that the Norse, who primarily lived south of the River Tees, affected the language in Yorkshire but not in regions to the north. This source adds that "the border skirmishes that broke out sporadically during the Middle Ages meant the River Tweed established itself as a significant northern barrier against Scottish influence". Today, many who speak the Geordie dialect use words such as gan ('go' – modern Dutch gaan) and bairn ('child' – modern Danish barn), which "can still trace their roots right back to the Angles".

== Geographical coverage ==
=== People ===
When referring to the people, as opposed to the dialect, dictionary definitions of a Geordie typically refer to a native or inhabitant of Newcastle upon Tyne, England, or its environs, an area that encompasses North Tyneside, Newcastle, South Tyneside and Gateshead. This area has a combined population of around 700,000, based on 2011 census-data.

The term itself, according to Brockett, originated from all the North East coal mines. The catchment area for the term "Geordie" can include Northumberland and County Durham or be confined to an area as small as the city of Newcastle upon Tyne and the metropolitan boroughs of Tyneside.

Scott Dobson, the author of the book Larn Yersel Geordie, once stated that his grandmother, who was brought up in Byker, thought the miners were the true Geordies. There is a theory the name comes from the Northumberland and Durham coal mines. Poems and songs written in this area in 1876 (according to the OED), speak of the "Geordie".

=== Dialect ===
Academics refer to the Geordie dialect as "Tyneside English".

According to the British Library, "Locals insist there are significant differences between Geordie and several other local dialects, such as Pitmatic and Mackem. Pitmatic is the dialect of the former mining areas in County Durham and around Ashington to the north of Newcastle upon Tyne, while Mackem is used locally to refer to the dialect of the city of Sunderland and the surrounding urban area of Wearside".

== Etymology ==
A number of rival theories explain how the term Geordie came about, though all accept that it derives from a familiar diminutive form of the name George, "a very common name among the pitmen" (coal miners) in North East England; indeed, it was once the most popular name for eldest sons in the region.

One account traces the name to the times of the Jacobite Rebellion of 1715. The Jacobites declared that the natives of Newcastle were staunch supporters of the Hanoverian kings, whose first representative George I reigned (1714–1727) at the time of the 1715 rebellion. Newcastle contrasted with rural Northumberland, which largely supported the Jacobite cause. In this case, the term "Geordie" may have derived from the popular anti-Hanoverian song "Cam Ye O'er Frae France?", which calls the first Hanoverian king "Geordie Whelps", a play on "George the Guelph".

Another explanation for the name is that local miners in the northeast of England used Geordie safety lamps, designed by George Stephenson, known locally as "Geordie the engine-wright", in 1815 rather than the competing Davy lamps, designed about the same time by Humphry Davy and used in other mining communities. Using the chronological order of two John Trotter Brockett books, Geordie was given to North East pitmen; later he acknowledges that the pitmen also christened their Stephenson lamp Geordie.

Linguist Katie Wales also dates the term earlier than does the current Oxford English Dictionary; she observes that Geordy (or Geordie) was a common name given to coal-mine pitmen in ballads and songs of the region, noting that such usage turns up as early as 1793. It occurs in the titles of two songs by songwriter Joe Wilson: "Geordy, Haud the Bairn" and "Keep your Feet Still, Geordie". Citing such examples as the song "Geordy Black", written by Rowland Harrison of Gateshead, she contends that, as a consequence of popular culture, the miner and the keelman had become icons of the region in the 19th century, and "Geordie" was a label that "affectionately and proudly reflected this," replacing the earlier ballad emblem, the figure of Bob Crankie.

In the English Dialect Dictionary of 1900, Joseph Wright gave as his fourth definition of "Geordie": A man from Tyneside; a miner; a north-country collier vessel, quoting two sources from Northumberland, one from East Durham and one from Australia. The source from Durham stated: "In South Tyneside even, this name was applied to the Lower Tyneside men."

Newcastle publisher Frank Graham's Geordie Dictionary states:

The origin of the word Geordie has been a matter of much discussion and controversy. All the explanations are fanciful and not a single piece of genuine evidence has ever been produced.

In Graham's many years of research, the earliest record he found of the term's use dated to 1823 by local comedian Billy Purvis. Purvis had set up a booth at the Newcastle Races on the Town Moor. In an angry tirade against a rival showman, who had hired a young pitman called Tom Johnson to dress as a clown, Billy cried out to the clown:

Ah man, wee but a feul wad hae sold off his furnitor and left his wife. Noo, yor a fair doon reet feul, not an artificial feul like Billy Purvis! Thous a real Geordie! gan man an hide thysel! gan an' get thy picks agyen. Thou may de for the city, but never for the west end o' wor toon.

(Rough translation: "Oh man, who but a fool would have sold off his furniture and left his wife? Now, you're a fair downright fool, not an artificial fool like Billy Purvis! You're a real Geordie! Go on, man, and hide yourself! Go on and get your picks [axes] again. You may do for the city, but never for the west end of our town!")

John Camden Hotten wrote in 1869: "Geordie, general term in Northumberland and Durham for a pitman, or coal-miner. Origin not known; the term has been in use more than a century." Using Hotten as a chronological reference, Geordie has been documented for at least 257 years as a term related to Northumberland and County Durham.

The name Bad-weather Geordy applied to cockle sellers:

As the season at which cockles are in greatest demand is generally the most stormy in the year – September to March – the sailors' wives at the seaport towns of Northumberland and Durham consider the cry of the cockle man as the harbinger of bad weather, and the sailor, when he hears the cry of 'cockles alive,' in a dark wintry night, concludes that a storm is at hand, and breathes a prayer, backwards, for the soul of Bad-Weather-Geordy.

— S. Oliver, Rambles in Northumberland, 1835

Travel writer Scott Dobson used the term "Geordieland" in a 1973 guidebook to refer collectively to Northumberland and Durham.

== Linguistic surveys ==
The Survey of English Dialects included Earsdon and Heddon-on-the-Wall in its fieldwork, administering more than 1,000 questions to local informants.

The Linguistic Survey of Scotland included Cumberland and Northumberland (using historic boundaries) in its scope, collecting words through postal questionnaires. Tyneside sites included Cullercoats, Earsdon, Forest Hall, Gosforth, Newcastle upon Tyne, Wallsend-on-Tyne and Whitley Bay.

== Phonology ==
The phonemic notation used in this article is based on the set of symbols used by Watt & Allen (2003). Other scholars may use different transcriptions. Watt and Allen stated that there were approximately 800,000 people in the early 2000s who spoke this form of British English.

Tyneside English (TE) is spoken in Newcastle upon Tyne, a city of around 260,000 inhabitants in the far north of England, and in the conurbation stretching east and south of Newcastle along the valley of the River Tyne as far as the North Sea. The total population of this conurbation, which also subsumes Gateshead, Jarrow, North and South Shields, Whitley Bay, and Tynemouth, exceeds 800,000.

=== Consonants ===
Geordie consonants generally follow those of Received Pronunciation, with these unique characteristics as follows:

- /ɪŋ/ appearing in an unstressed final syllable of a word (such as in reading) is pronounced as [ən] (thus, reading is [ˈɹiːdən]).
- The Geordie accent does not use the glottal stop in a usual fashion. It is characterised by a unique type of glottal stops. /p, t, k/ can all be pronounced simultaneously with a glottal stop after them in Geordie, both at the end of a syllable and sometimes before a weak vowel.
  - T-glottalisation, in which /t/ is realised by [ʔ] before a syllabic nasal (e.g., button as [ˈbʊtʔn̩]), in absolute final position (get as [ɡɛtʔ]), and whenever the /t/ is intervocalic so long as the latter vowel is not stressed (pity as [ˈpɪtʔi]).
  - Glottaling in Geordie is known as 'pre-glottalisation', which is "an occlusion at the appropriate place of articulation and 'glottalisation', usually manifested as a short period of laryngealised voice before and/or after and often also during the stop gap". This type of glottal is unique to Tyneside English.
- Other voiceless stops, /p, k/, are glottally reinforced in medial position, and preaspirated in final position.
- The dialect is non-rhotic like most other dialects of England, with /r/ being realised most commonly as an alveolar approximant [ɹ], although a labiodental realisation [ʋ] is additionally growing in prevalence among younger females. (This variant is also possible, albeit rarer, in the speech of older males.) Traditionally, intrusive R was not present in Geordie, with speakers instead glottalising between boundaries; however, it is present in newer varieties of the dialect.
- Yod-coalescence in both stressed and unstressed syllables (so that dew becomes [dʒɵʊ]).
- /l/ is traditionally clear in all contexts, meaning the velarised allophone is absent. However, modern accents may periodically use [ɫ] in syllable final positions, sometimes it may even be vocalised (as in bottle [ˈbɒʔʊ]).

=== Vowels ===
Monophthongs of Geordie (from Watt & Allen (2003:268)). Some of these values may not be representative of all speakers.

Monophthongs of Geordie
	Front			Central	Back	
	unrounded		rounded	Central	Back	
	short	long	rounded	Central	short	long
Close	ɪ	iː				uː
Close-mid		eː	øː		ʊ	oː
Open-mid	ɛ	ɛː		ə		ɔː
Open	a	(aː)			ɒ	ɒː

Length

- For some speakers, vowel length alternates with vowel quality in a very similar way to the Scottish vowel length rule.
- Vowel length is phonemic for many speakers of Geordie, meaning that length is often the one and only phonetic difference between DRESS and SQUARE (/ɛ/ and /ɛː/) or between LOT and START/PALM (/ɒ/ and /ɒː/). If older or traditional dialect forms are considered, TRAP (/a/) also has a phonemic long counterpart /aː/, which is mostly used in THOUGHT words spelled with ⟨a⟩, making minimal pairs such as tack /tak/ vs. talk /taːk/ (less broad Geordie pronunciation: /tɔːk/). Another [aː] appears as an allophone of /a/ before final voiced consonants in words such as lad [laːd].

Phonetic quality and phonemic incidence

- FLEECE and GOOSE, /iː, uː/, are typically somewhat closer than in other varieties in morphologically closed syllables; /uː/ is also less prone to fronting than in other varieties of BrE and its quality is rather close to the cardinal [u]. However, younger women tend to use a central [ʉː] instead. In morphologically open syllables, FLEECE and GOOSE are realised as closing diphthongs [ei, ɵʊ]. This creates minimal pairs such as freeze [fɹiːz] vs. frees [fɹeiz] and bruise [bɹuːz ~ bɹʉːz] (hereafter transcribed with ⟨uː⟩ for the sake of simplicity) vs. brews [bɹɵʊz].
  - The HAPPY vowel is tense [i] and is best analysed as belonging to the /iː/ phoneme.
- As with other Northern English varieties, Geordie lacks the FOOT–STRUT split, so that words like cut, up and luck have the same /ʊ/ phoneme as put, sugar and butcher. The typical phonetic realisation is unrounded [ɤ], but it may be hypercorrected to [ə] among middle-class (especially female) speakers.
- The long close-mid vowels /eː, oː/, in FACE and GOAT, may be realised as monophthongs [eː, oː] in open syllables or as opening diphthongs [ɪə, ʊə] in closed syllables. Alternatively, /eː/ can be a closing diphthong [eɪ] and /oː/ can be centralised to [ɵː]. The opening diphthongs are recessive, as younger speakers reject them in favour of the monophthongal [eː, oː ~ ɵː].
  - Other, now archaic, realisations of /oː/ include [aː] in snow [snaː] and [aʊ] in soldiers [ˈsaʊldʒɐz].
  - Many female speakers merge GOAT /oː/ with THOUGHT /ɔː/, but the exact phonetic quality of the merged vowel is uncertain.
- NURSE, /øː/, may be phonetically [øː] or a higher, unrounded vowel [ɪː]. An RP-like vowel [ɜ̝ː] is also possible.
  - In older broadest Geordie, NURSE merges with THOUGHT /ɔː/ to [ɔː] under the influence of a uvular [ʁ] that once followed it (when Geordie was still a rhotic dialect). The fact that the original /ɔː/ vowel is never hypercorrected to [øː] or [ɜ̝ː] suggests that either this merger was never categorical, or that speakers are unusually successful in sorting those vowels out again.
- The schwa /ə/ is often rather open ([ɐ]). It also tends to be longer in duration than the preceding stressed vowel, even if that vowel is phonologically long. Therefore, words such as water and meter are pronounced [ˈwɔd̰ɐː] and [ˈmid̰ɐː]. This feature is shared with the very conservative (Upper Crust) variety of Received Pronunciation.
  - Words such as voices and ended have /ə/ in the second syllable (so /ˈvɔɪsəz, ˈɛndəd/), rather than the /ɪ/ of RP. That does not mean that Geordie has undergone the weak vowel merger because /ɪ/ can still be found in some unstressed syllables in place of the more usual /ə/. An example of that is the second syllable of seven /ˈsɛvɪn/, but it can also be pronounced with a simple schwa /ə/ instead. Certain weak forms also have /ɪ/ instead of /ə/; these include at /ɪt/ (homophonous with strong it), of /ɪv/ (nearly homophonous with if), as /ɪz/ (homophonous with strong is), can /kɪn/ and us /ɪz/ (again, homophonous with strong is).
- As in other Northern English dialects, the BATH vowel is short /a/ in Geordie, thus there is no London-style TRAP–BATH split. There are a small number of exceptions to this rule; for instance, half, master, plaster and sometimes also disaster are pronounced with the START/PALM vowel /ɒː/.
- Some speakers unround START/PALM, /ɒː/, to [ɑː]. Regardless of the rounding, the difference in backness between /ɒː/ and /a/ is very pronounced, a feature which Geordie shares with RP and some northern and midland cities such as Stoke-on-Trent and Derby, but not with the accents of the middle north.
- Older traditional Geordie does not always adhere to the same distributional patterns of vowels found in standard varieties of English. Examples of that include the words no and stone, which may be pronounced [niː] and [stɪən], so with vowels that are best analysed as belonging to the /iː/ and /iə/ phonemes.

Part 1 of Geordie diphthongs (from Watt & Allen (2003:268))

Part 2 of Geordie diphthongs (from Watt & Allen (2003:268)). /æʊ/ shows considerable phonetic variation.

Diphthongs of Geordie
		Endpoint		
		Front	Central	Back
Start point	Front	ɛɪ (aɪ)	iə	æʊ
Start point	Back	ɔɪ	uə	

Diphthongs

- The second elements of NEAR and CURE, /iə, uə/, are commonly as open as the typical Geordie realisation of /ə/ ([ɐ]).
- The first element of MOUTH, /æʊ/, varies between [æ], [ä] and [ɛ]. Traditionally, this whole vowel was a high monophthong [uː] (with town being pronounced close to RP toon) and this pronunciation can still be heard, as can a narrower diphthong [əu] (with town being pronounced close to RP tone).
- PRICE is /ɛɪ/, but Geordie speakers generally use a less common allophone for certain environments in accordance with the Scottish vowel length rule, [äɪ], which has a longer, lower, and more back onset than the main allophone. Thus [ɛɪ] is used in words such as knife [nɛɪf], whereas [äɪ] is used in knives [näɪvz]. For simplicity, both of them are written with ⟨ɛɪ⟩ in this article.

== Vocabulary ==
The Geordie dialect shares similarities with other Northern English dialects, as well as with the Scots language (See Rowe 2007, 2009).

Dorfy, real name Dorothy Samuelson-Sandvid, was a noted Geordie dialect writer. In her column for the South Shields Gazette, Samuelson-Sandvid attests many samples of Geordie language usage, such as the nouns bairn ("child") and clarts ("mud"); the adjectives canny ("pleasant") and clag ("sticky"); and the imperative verb phrase howay ("hurry up!"; "come on!")

Howay is broadly comparable to the invocation "Come on!" or the French "Allez-y!" ("Go on!"). Examples of common use include Howay man!, meaning "come on" or "hurry up", Howay the lads! as a term of encouragement for a sports team for example (the players' tunnel at St James' Park has this phrase just above the entrance to the pitch), or Ho'way!? (with stress on the second syllable) expressing incredulity or disbelief. The literal opposite of this phrase is haddaway ("go away"); although not as common as howay, it is perhaps most commonly used in the phrase "Haddaway an' shite" (Tom Hadaway, Figure 5.2 Haddaway an' shite; 'Cursing like sleet blackening the buds, raging at the monk of Jarrow scribbling his morality and judgement into a book.').

Another word, divvie or divvy ("idiot"), seems to come from the Co-op dividend, or from the two Davy lamps (the more explosive Scotch Davy used in 1850, commission disapproved of its use in 1886 (inventor not known, nicknamed Scotch Davy probably given by miners after the Davy lamp was made perhaps by north east miners who used the Stephenson Lamp), and the later better designed Davy designed by Humphry Davy also called the Divvy.) As in a north east miner saying 'Marra, ye keep way from me if ye usin a divvy.' It seems the word divvie then translated to daft lad/lass. Perhaps coming from the fact one would be seen as foolish going down a mine with a Scotch Divvy when there are safer lamps available, like the Geordie, or the Davy.

The Geordie word netty, meaning a toilet and place of need and necessity for relief or bathroom, has an uncertain origin. However, some have theorised that it may come from slang used by Roman soldiers on Hadrian's Wall, which may have later become gabinetti in the Romance language Italian (such as in the Westoe Netty, the subject of a famous painting from Bob Olley). Gabinetto in Modern Italian actually derives from the French word cabinet, which can also have the meaning of "toilet" (cabinet d'aisances). Thus, another explanation would be that it comes from the Modern Italian plural form of the word gabinetti, though only a relatively small number of Italians have migrated to the North of England, mostly during the 19th century.

Some etymologists connect the word netty to the Modern English word needy. John Trotter Brockett, writing in 1829 in his A glossary of north country words..., claims that the etymon of netty (and its related form neddy) is the Modern English needy and need.

Bill Griffiths, in A Dictionary of North East Dialect, points to the earlier form, the Old English níd; he writes: "MS locates a possible early ex. "Robert Hovyngham sall make... at the other end of his house a knyttyng" York 1419, in which case the root could be OE níd 'necessary'". Another related word, nessy is thought (by Griffiths) to derive from the Modern English "necessary".

A poem called "Yam" narrated by author Douglas Kew demonstrates the usage of a number of Geordie words.

The term "Geordie" has been applied to the Geordie Schooner, a glass traditionally used to serve Newcastle Brown Ale.

Vocabulary usage
- aa/aye/ai, yes
- aall, all
- aalwiz, always
- aboot, about
- alang, along
- alreet, alright
- an, and
- baccy, tobacco
- bairn, child
- cannit, cannot
- canny, pleasant
- childhud, childhood
- clag, sticky
- clarts, mud
- dee, do
- dinnor, dinner
- divvn't, don't
- divvy, idiot
- doilum, idiot
- Frida, Friday
- fud, food
- gan hyem, go home
- gan on, go on
- gan, go
- gan't, gone to
- geet, very, really
- guzzlin, eating
- haad, hold (e.g. keep a haad is 'keep a hold' and haad yer gob becomes 'keep quiet'.)
- haadaway, get away, (disbelief)
- heor, hear
- hinny, honey (a term of endearment)
- hoose, house
- hooswife, Housewife
- hord, heard
- howay, hurry up, come on
- hoy, to throw
- hyem-myed, home made
- ivry, every
- lang, long
- larns, learns
- larnt, taught
- ma/mar/mam, mother
- mesel, myself
- Monda, Monday
- neebody, nobody
- neet, night
- noo, now
- nooadays, nowadays
- nowt, nothing
- oot, out
- owt, anything
- pianna, piano
- reelise, realise
- reet, right
- roond, around or round
- smaall, small
- stotty-cyek, stotty cake (bread)
- summack or summit, something
- Sunda, Sunday
- taak, talk
- thor's, there's
- Thorsda', Thursday
- waarms, warms
- watt, what
- wawd, word
- wesh, wash
- wheor, where
- wor, our
- worsel's, ourselves
- y'kin, you can

== Sources ==
- Beal, Joan (2004), "English dialects in the North of England: phonology", in Schneider, Edgar W.; Burridge, Kate; Kortmann, Bernd; Mesthrie, Rajend; Upton, Clive (eds.), A handbook of varieties of English, vol. 1: Phonology, Mouton de Gruyter, pp. 113–133, ISBN 3-11-017532-0
- Colls, Robert; Lancaster, Bill (1992), Geordies: roots of regionalism (2nd ed.), Newcastle upon Tyne : Northumbria University Press, ISBN 978-1904794127
- Di Martino, Emilia (2019), Celebrity Accents and Public Identity Construction. Geordie Stylizations, Routledge, ISBN 978-1000022407
- Keuchler, Karsten (2010), Geordie Accent and Tyneside English, GRIN Verlag, ISBN 978-3640742738
- Pearce, Michael (2020), "The Survival of Traditional Dialect Lexis on the Participatory Web", English Studies, 101 (4): 487–509, doi:10.1080/0013838X.2020.1805184
- Rowe, Charley (2007), "He divn't gan tiv a college ti di that, man! A study of do (and to) in Tyneside English", Language Sciences, 12 (2): 360–371, doi:10.1016/j.langsci.2006.12.013
- Rowe, Charley (2009), Salience and resilience in a set of Tyneside English shibboleths, Language Variation: European Perspectives II, Amsterdam: John Benjamins, pp. 191–204
- Simmelbauer, Andrea (2000), The dialect of Northumberland: A lexical investigation, Anglistische Forschungen, Universitätsverlag C. Winter, ISBN 978-3825309343
- Watt, Dominic (2000), "Phonetic parallels between the close–mid vowels of Tyneside English: Are they internally or externally motivated?", Language Variation and Change, 12 (1): 69–101, doi:10.1017/S0954394500121040, S2CID 144002794
- Watt, Dominic; Allen, William (2003), "Tyneside English", Journal of the International Phonetic Association, 33 (2): 267–271, doi:10.1017/S0025100303001397
- Wells, John C. (1982), Accents of English, Vol. 2: The British Isles (pp. i–xx, 279–466), Cambridge University Press, doi:10.1017/CBO9780511611759, ISBN 0-52128540-2
