= Humber–Lune line =

Traditional Old English dialect boundary

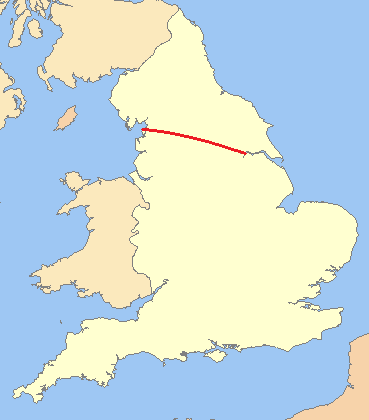
The Humber-Lune line.

The Humber–Lune line is a term used for the traditional dialect boundary in England between descendants of Northumbrian Old English to the north and Mercian Old English to the south. It is considered the most significant dialect boundary within the Anglic dialect continuum and separates the Scots language and traditional Northern English dialects from all other Anglic varieties. The line trends from south-east to north-west, from the Humber estuary to the mouth of the Cumbrian River Lune west of Lancaster. (Note: This article is founded on the Cumbrian River Lune, not to be confused with the River Lune, Durham located nearby in County Durham.) In the 1899 publication On Early English Pronunciation, Part V, the dialectologist Alexander John Ellis attempted a precise plotting of the line, which he referred to as the "hoose line" because areas north of the line use the hoose pronunciation (also found in Scots) rather than heawse or haase variants found south of the line.

== Movement over time ==
Within the last century the line has moved northwards to the Tees. Traditional Northumbrian dialects (in the broadest sense of the word) are now essentially extinct in some Yorkshire areas where they were previously spoken, such as Kingston upon Hull or York, but may still be heard in northerly areas of Yorkshire, such as Stokesley. Northumbrian dialects are still spoken by younger speakers in Northumberland, Durham, and Cumberland, especially in areas around the Scottish Border.

== Phonetic description ==
Traditional Northern English dialects spoken north of the line, alongside the closely related Scots language, appear highly divergent and underwent markedly different paths of development from all other Anglic dialects. Primarily, differences in the development of early ME /uː/, early ME /oː/, and OE /ɑː/, the development of early ME short /o/ and short /e/ when subject to Open Syllable Lengthening, and the lengthening of OE short /u/ and /i/ before clusters of homorganic nasal plus stop, and the development of OE short /a/ before [ng] took radically different paths of development on either side of the line. Traditional Northern or Scots dialects, therefore, have coo [kuː] for cow, grund [grʊnd] for ground, wrang [ɹaŋ] for wrong, and stane [sten] (Scots) or styen/steean [stɪən] (Northern) for stone.
