= Maud (plaid) =

Woollen blanket or plaid

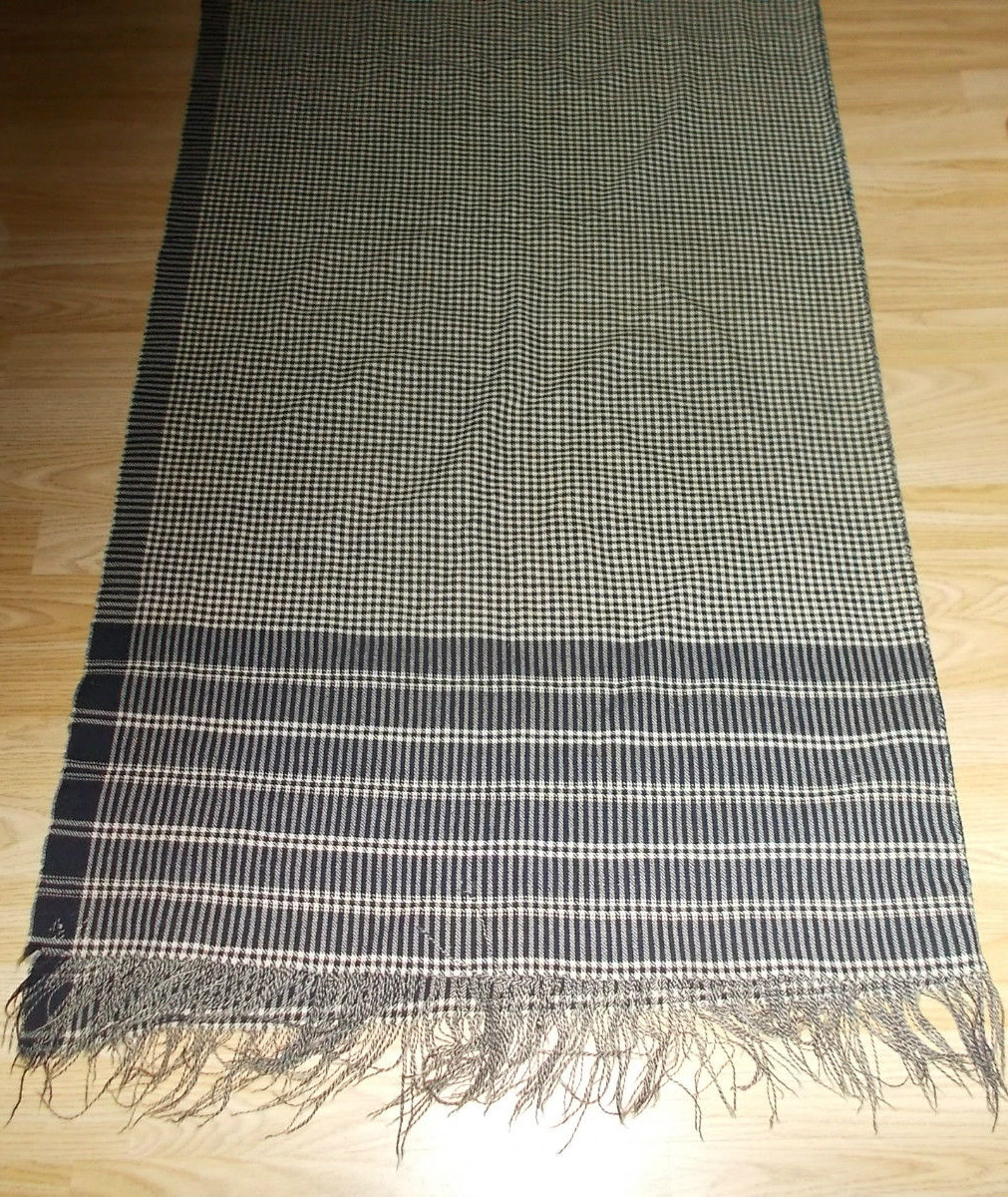
A maud, folded lengthwise, from Lanarkshire, Scotland. Place of manufacture unknown.

A maud (also Lowland plaid or Low Country plaid) is a woollen blanket or plaid woven in a pattern of small black and white checks known as Border tartan, Shepherd's check, Shepherd's plaid or Galashiels grey. It was in common use as an item of clothing in the southern counties of Scotland and the northern counties of England until the early twentieth century.

== Etymology ==
The origin of the word maud is uncertain. Writing in 1894, Russell said that it came from the Gaelic maudal or maundal, a poetic synonym for plaid. Her view seems to be backed by an old poem in Gaelic, "The Tale of Connal", recorded in Ross-shire in 1859, which has the line, "And wrapped my maundal around". An alternate source is that the word derives from maldy, meaning 'a coarse grey woollen cloth', which in turn comes from medley, meaning 'a parti-coloured cloth', by way of mispronunciation. However, the reverse is also said to be true, whereby maldy was an early-19th-century noun for yarn and cloth used to make mauds, as in "a cloak of maldy", where it was pronounced "mawdy".

Spelling and pronunciation varies throughout the Border lands. It was written maud or mawd in southern Scotland and northern England but also maad in parts of Scotland and Northumberland, mad in Lancashire and maund in West Yorkshire. In long form, it was called a shepherd's maud, in Northumberland, a herd's maud, and in parts of south-west Scotland, a Moffat maud.

== Description ==
A maud is a rectangular, woollen blanket with fringed ends. It is characteristically woven in small checks of dark and light wool; for example, black, blue or dark brown, and white, cream or light grey. The most common pattern is often called shepherd's check but some mauds are woven in a houndstooth pattern. A maud also commonly has a border or inset border of the darker wool and between one and six bars of the darker wool at the ends. An analysis of various written and artistic works puts dimensions between 0.9m to 1.5m wide and between 2.5m and 3.5m long. While commercially-produced mauds are often of one piece, many older and home-produced mauds woven on smaller looms are of two narrow lengths sewn lengthwise together. When woven to be joined, each length has a border along only one length, as pictured above.

== Use ==
=== Traditional use ===
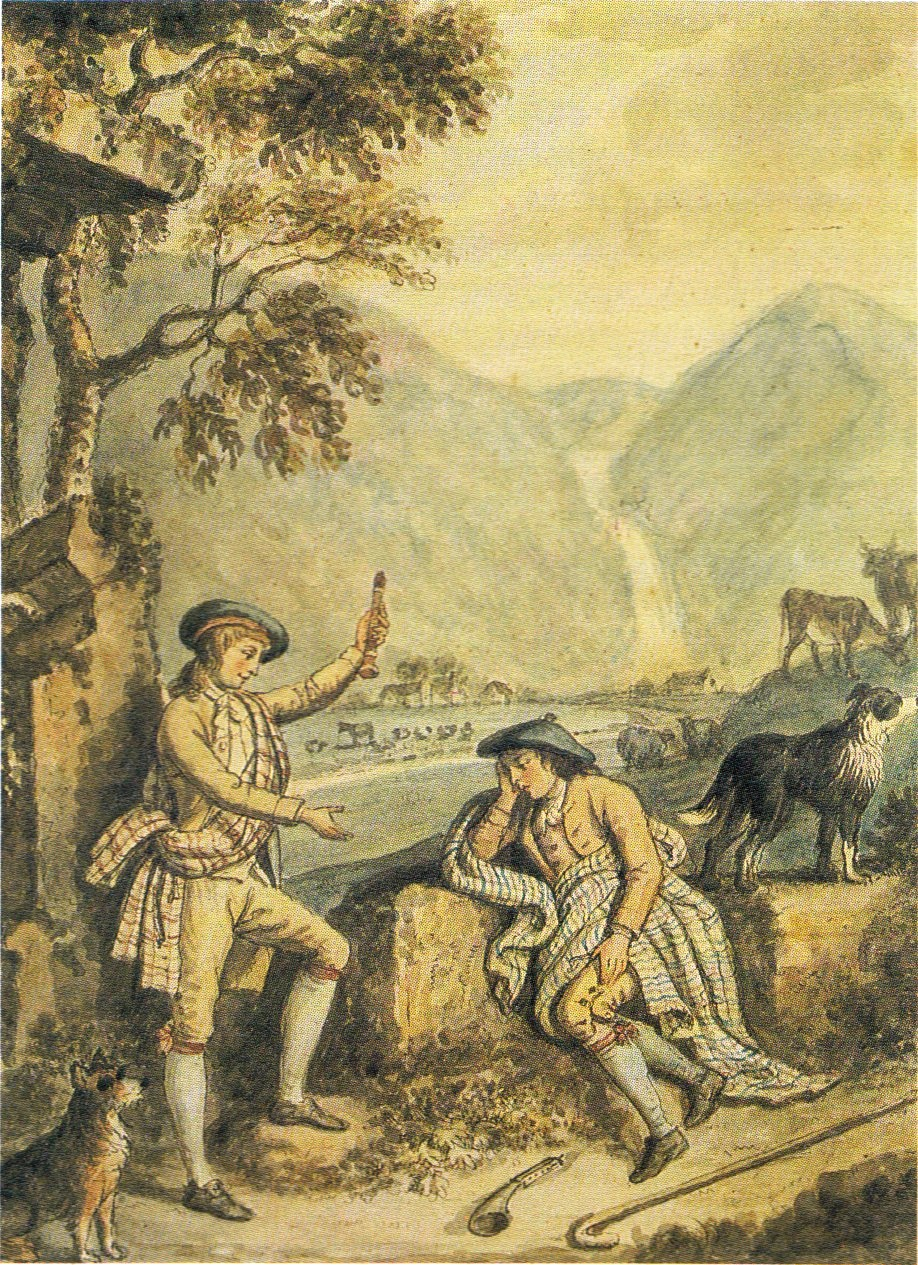
The Craigy Bield by David Allan, 1786, showing shepherds of the Lothians in mauds.

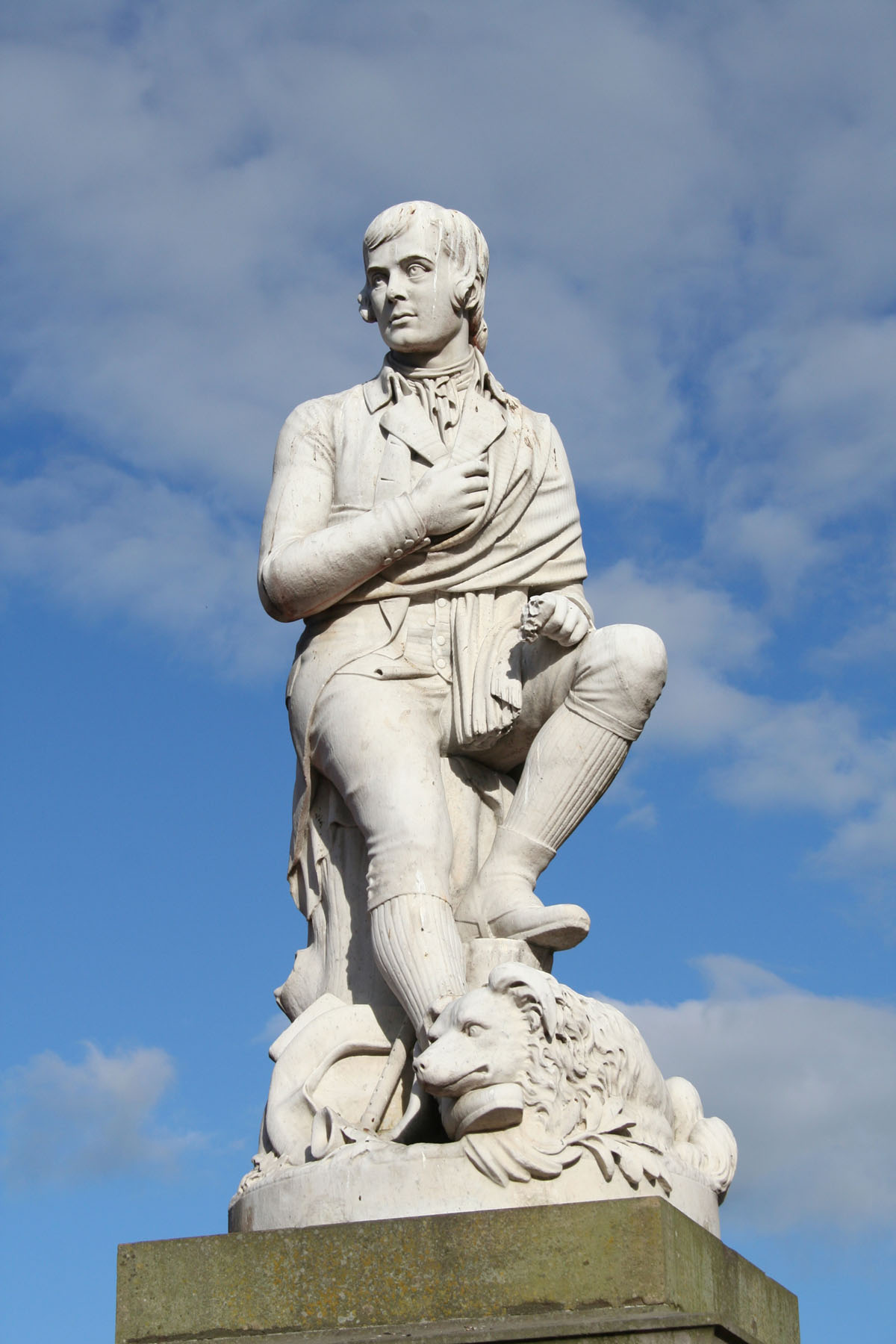
Statue of Robbie Burns, Dumfries, by Amelia Hill.

The Rev. George Gunn provides an early reference of the maud as a shepherd's garment. Drawing from barony records of Stichill, Roxburgh from 1655-1807, he said, "The maud, or shepherd's plaid, and the blue bonnet marked the peasant's dress." (p.10). Supporting the maud being used by the common folk, whilst also noting it as a male garment, the Rev. Archibald Craig, writing in the New Statistical Account of Scotland for Roxburghshire, said:

The dress of the peasantry is neat and becoming. The plaid or maud of the border, consisting of black and white, or blue and white checks, is almost universal among the men, and they arrange it with a good deal of taste.

A description of the appearance, age and use of the maud is best summed up by Walter Scott, when he wrote:

The plaid was never in use among the Borderers, i.e. the Highland or tartan plaid; but there was, and is still used, a plaid with a very small cheque of black and grey, which we call a maud, and which, I believe, was very ancient; it is the constant dress of the shepherd, worn over one shoulder, and then drawn round the person, leaving one arm free.

On another occasion he described the wearing of what must have been a longer maud, writing:

... a Maud or Low Country plaid. It is a long piece of cloth about a yard wide wrapped loosely round the waist like a scarf & from thence brought across the breast & the end thrown over the left shoulder where it hangs loose like a Spanish Cloak. It is not of Tartan but of the natural colour of the wool with a very small black check which gives it a greyish look … A broad belt about his waist is also part of his costume – it served to retain one end of the Maud & occasionally to carry a large knife or dagger.

The maud was therefore the outer garment of the shepherd or common man. It provided warmth amongst the Border hills, protection from the rain and was his blanket at night. The voluminous nature of the wrapped maud also meant that pockets or nooks, known as ‘maud neuks/nuiks', could be fashioned for the carrying of ‘fairns' (food), other provisions and even lambs.

The method of carrying the maud was dictated by its size and possibly local custom. A Cumberland Shepherd, painted by Joshua Cristall in 1816 shows a short maud carried wrapped around the waist. The Shepherd's Sweetheart by Thomas Brooks (1846) and The Craigy Bield, above, show a medium-length maud carried over the left shoulder and tied in a half-knot at the right hip. Scott's first description, above, and many portraits and statues of Scott, James Hogg and Robbie Burns, show a long maud draped over the left shoulder, brought diagonally around the body and passed over the left shoulder, with both ends reaching about waist height. In some pictures, the same length maud is wrapped in the same manner but over the right arm, instead of under, to form a sort of mantle. Scott's second description, above, describes the carrying of a long maud, wrapped around the waist and passed diagonally over the chest to fall behind the left shoulder.

=== Popular use ===
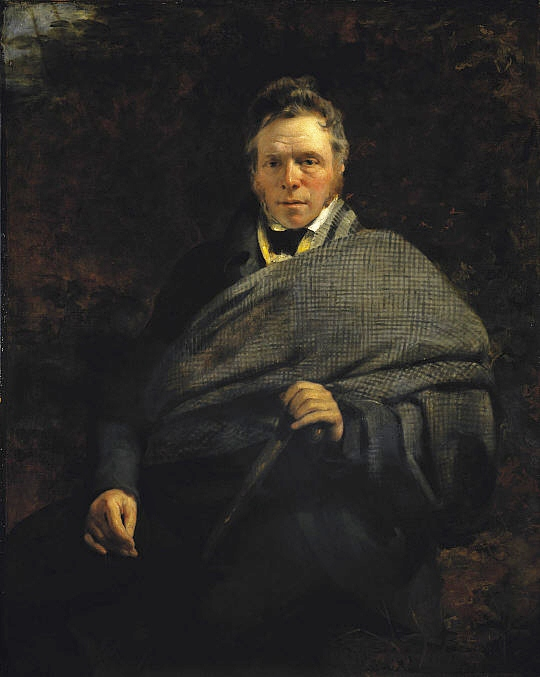
James Hogg wearing a maud, by Sir John Watson Gordon, 1830.

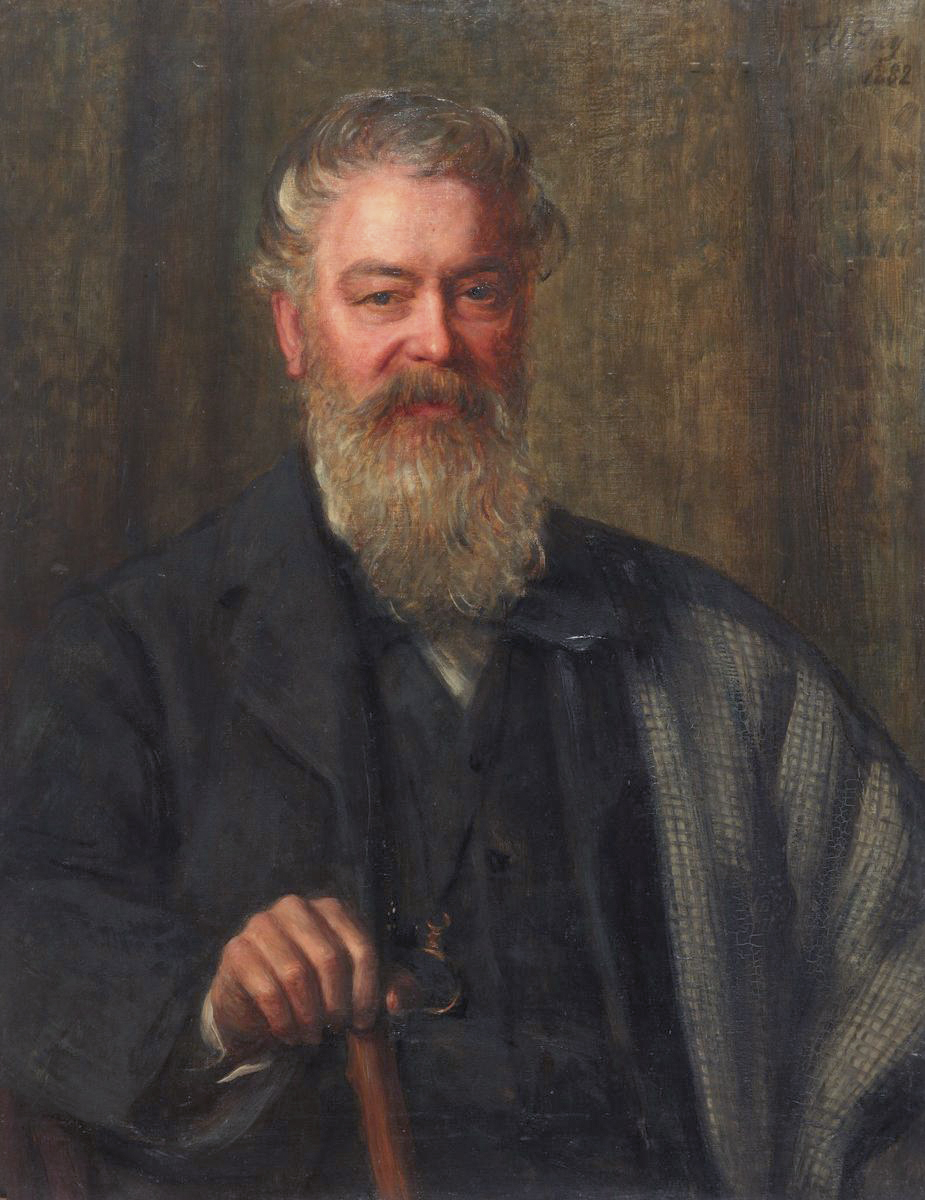
Edwin Waugh, wearing a maud over his left shoulder, by (William Percy, 1882)

The maud gained popularity as a symbol of the Scottish Borders from 1820 due to its mention by fashionable Border Scots such as Walter Scott, James Hogg and Henry Scott Riddell and their wearing of it in public. Together with Robbie Burns, they can be seen wearing a maud in portraits, etchings and statues. This romantic revival may have prolonged the use of the maud and saved it from extinction; writing in 1808, Allan Ramsay said, "The wide great-coat, and the round hat, are, frequently, adopted for the grey checked plaid or mawd, and the broad blue bonnet with its scarlet rim;" (p. 396).

Edwin Waugh, a prominent 19th-century Lancastrian poet and writer, was identified by his use of the shepherd's plaid or maud.

He affected huge sticks, of which he had an immense collection, and he liked to throw a shepherd’s plaid over his shoulders... He was fond of clothing himself in honest homespun of the thickest texture, and of wearing huge broad-soled boots, guiltless of polish.

The garment is also associated with Northumbrian smallpipes. In 1857, William Green played at a dinner of the Society of Antiquaries of Newcastle upon Tyne:

Nor must we overlook the music—which, as it ought to be, was ancient—the orchestra consisting of a couple of bagpipes. The Percy pipers were the performers—the two Greens, father and son, the father, piper to the Duchess Dowager of Northumberland, wearing the silver crescent on his arm; and the son, piper to the Duke of Northumberland, wearing His Grace's livery and badge, with the Northumbrian maud.

The garment is still worn on ceremonial occasions by Northumbrian pipers, especially the Ducal pipers.

=== Modern use ===
It would seem that use of the maud on the Borders fell away towards the end of the 19th century and today, early mauds are relatively rare. One possible explanation is that England's Burying in Woollen Acts 1666-80 required the dead to be shrouded and buried in pure English wool. The Acts were in force until 1814 so rural folk being buried in their mauds may have accounted for many disappearing. Two more likely explanations were that mauds, as working garments, simply wore out; and that 19th century changes in fashion rendered the maud obsolete in favour of coats and then jumpers. In either case, old and un-needed mauds were probably thrown out.

In more recent decades, mauds have seen a modest revival as a part of Border Scots and Northern English traditional dress. The maud is often worn by Northumbrian pipers, and many Borderers choose to wear trews in their clan tartan rather than the Highland kilt, and some of these will pair their tartan trews with a checkered maud. A very few others may be seen at gatherings wearing a maud with Western clothes. In any case, to the discerning observer, the maud is as much an item of cultural identity as is the kilt.

Few mills now weave mauds in the Borders region. One has produced mauds in non-traditional and fashionable colours (such as light and dark orange, jade and red) in an attempt to attract modern buyers whilst another has positioned their product as a traditional Northumbrian collectable.

== See also ==
- Full plaid, a long, pleated, tartan-cloth mantle, wrapped around the upper body and then thrown over the shoulder
- Fly plaid, a smaller tartan-cloth mantle, worn pinned to the left shoulder
- Belted plaid or "great kilt", an earlier form of the kilt, it was a large plaid (blanket) pleated by hand and belted around the waist
