= Border check =

Border check may refer to:

- Border tartan, a very simple tartan pattern known by many other names such as shepherds' check, Northumbrian tartan, and Borders drab
- Border control of immigration of and visitation by persons across a national border
- Customs examination of what persons are bringing with them across a national border
