= List of demonyms for the United Kingdom =

List of UK demonyms

This is a list of demonyms for places, counties and regions within the United Kingdom. A demonym derives from its place name - such as Mancunian from Manchester. As such, this list is reserved for actual demonyms of British places, and does not include colloquial nicknames for people such as Jam Eater for those from Whitehaven, or Smoggie from Middlesbrough.

== England ==
Location	Demonym(s)	Notes	Ref
Avon	Avonian	Former county, now unitary authority area centred around Bristol.	
Barnstaple	Barumites	The town had the Latin name of ad Barnastapolitum, which became shortened to Barum.	
Barrow-in-Furness	Barrovian		
Bath	Bathonian		
Bedford	Bedfordian	Also applies to the wider county of Bedfordshire, and the school as an Old Bedfordian.	
Belgravia	Belgravian	An affluent suburb of London. The term Belgravian was popularised by writers such as William Makepeace Thackery and Matthew Arnold.	
Berkshire	Berkshireman/Berkshirewoman		
Biggleswade	Biggleswadian		
Birmingham	Brummie	Derived from Brummagem, a demonym from Bromwich-Ham. Also less popular is Birminghamian.	
Bournemouth	Bournemouthian		
Bradford	Bradfordian		
Brighton	Brightonian	Also refers to alumni from the school (Old Brightonians).	
Bristol	Bristolian		
Buckinghamshire	Bucksian		
Cambridge	Cantabrigian	Used to describe the inhabitants of the city, and those who are attending the university in the city. Cantab is also used occasionally.	
Carlisle	Carlislian		
Chelmsford	Chelmsfordian		
Chester	Cestrian	Also applies to the inhabitants of Cheshire, of which Chester is the county town.	
Chichester	Cisetrian		
Clitheroe	Clitheronian		
Coalville	Coalvillian		
Congleton	Congletonian	Men from the town were also known as Congleton Bears, due to the bear-baiting that existed in the town.	
Cornwall	Cornish (person)		
Coventry	Coventrian		
Cumbria	Cumbrian, Cumberlander	Originally the area was Cumberland, which changed its county name to Cumbria in 1974.	
Darlington	Darlingtonian		
Derbyshire	Darbyite, Darbian (Note: A Derbyite, spelt with an E, refers to someone recruited for First World War service under a scheme promoted by the Earl of Derby.)		
Devon	Devonian, Devonite		
Doncaster	Doncastrian		
Dorset	Dorsetian		
Durham	Dunelmian	Also refers to alumni from the school (Old Dunelmians).	
Essex	Essexian	Originally, the name referred to anything to do with the Earl of Essex, but later came to be applied to members of the landed gentry families from the county of Essex.	
Exeter	Exonian		
Halifax	Haligonian		
Hampshire	Hantsian		
Harrogate	Harrogatonian		
Hartlepool	Hartlepudlian		
Herefordshire	Herefordian		
Hertfordshire	Hertfordian	Pronounced as Hartfordian.	
Huddersfield	Huddersfieldian		
Humberside	Humbersider	Denotes someone from the former county of Humberside, land clustered around the Humber Estuary.	
Ingleton	Ingletonian		
Kent	Kentish Man, or Man of Kent	Dickson lists these as demonyms. A Kentish man denotes someone who hails from west of the River Medway, whereas a Man of Kent denotes someone from east of the Medway.	
Kingston upon Hull (Hull)	Hullensian		
Lancaster	Lancastrian		
Leeds	Loiner, Leodensian	Derived from an old name for Leeds (Loidis).	
Lincoln	Lincolnian, Lindunian		
Liverpool	Liverpudlian		
London	Londoner		
Manchester	Mancunian		
Market Drayton	Draytonian	People from the town are also occasionally called Gingerbread men due to the towns Gingerbread industry or Salopian due to being in the County of Shropshire.	
Middlesbrough	Middlesbroughian		
Newcastle	Novocastrian		
Norfolk	Norfolkian		
Northumbria	Northumbrian	The name Northumbria related to the region due north of the River Humber, essentially anyone who lived in Yorkshire, County Durham and Northumbria. The term is now used only for people from the county of Northumberland.	
Norwich	Norvician		
Nottingham	Nottinghamian		
Oswestry	Oswestrian		
Oxford	Oxonian	The term also applies to a graduate of Oxford University, although more often, the term Oxbridge (Oxbridgian) applies, which puts graduates of Cambridge and Oxford together.	
Penzance	Penzancian		
Peterborough	Peterborian		
Pickering	Pickeronian		
Plymouth	Plymothian		
Pontefract	Pomfretian	Pontefract cakes (made from liquorice) were sometimes known as Pomfret Cakes.	
Portsmouth	Portsmouthian		
Preston	Prestonian		
Putney	Putneyite		
Ramsgate	Ramsgatonian		
Richmond, North Yorkshire	Richmondian	There is also a Richmond on Thames in Greater London.	
Ripon	Riponer, or Riponian		
Rochdale	Rochdalian		
Runcorn	Runcornian		
Scarborough	Scarborian		
Isles of Scilly	Scillonian		
Selby	Selebian		
Sheffield	Sheffielder		
Shropshire	Salopian	Also can be used to describe people from the county town of Shrewsbury.	
Slough	Paludin	The name is said to have derived from the Latin for a slough (marsh); Palus.	
Solihull	Silhillian		
Southampton	Sotonian or Southamptonian	These demonyms were created by a local newspaper as fitting in Southampton and Southamptonian proved difficult in headlines.	
Stockport	Stopfordian	Also refers to alumni from the grammar school (Old Stopfordians).	
Stockton-on-Tees	Stocktonian		
Stratford-upon-Avon	Stratfordian		
Tadcaster	Tadcastrian		
Telford	Telfordian	When the new town developed in the 1970s, a competition was held to decide on a name for the local inhabitants; Telfordinian and Telfordonian were also considered.	
Torquay	Torquinian		
Truro	Truronian		
Ulverston	Ulverstonian		
Isle of Wight	Vectian	Derives from the Roman name for the Isle of Wight, Vectis.	
Whitby	Whitbian		
Wolverhampton	Wulfrunian	Sometimes referred to as Wolverhamptonians.	
Wythenshawe	Wythenshavian		
Yorkshire	Yorkshireman/Yorkshirewoman		

== Northern Ireland ==
Location	Demonym(s)	Notes	Ref
Armagh	Armachian		
Belfast	Belfastian		
Coleraine	Colerainers, or Colerainians		

== Scotland ==
Location	Demonym(s)	Notes	Ref
Aberdeen	Aberdonian		
Argyll	Argathelian		
Dundee	Dundonian		
Edinburgh	Edinburgher		
Fife	Fifer		
Forfar	Forfarian		
Galloway	Gallovidan, Galwegian		
Glasgow	Glaswegian	Weegie, a nickname for those from Glasgow, derives from Glaswegian.	
Inverness	Invernesian/Invernessian		
Oban	Obanite		
Orkney Islands	Orcadian, Orkney Islander, or Orkneyan		
Shetland Islands	Shetlander		

== Wales ==
Location	Demonym(s)	Notes	Ref
Aberystwyth	Aberystwythian		
Bangor	Bangorian		
Cardiff	Cardiffian		
Cardiganshire	Cardi		
Swansea	Swansean		
Wrexham	Wrexhamite		
