= Lancashire dialect =

Northern English vernacular native to Lancashire

- Native to: England
- Region: Lancashire
- Language family: Indo-European: Germanic; West Germanic; North Sea Germanic; Anglo-Frisian; Anglic; Anglian; North Anglic; Northern English; Lancashire dialect
- Early forms: Old English: Middle English (West Midlands and Northern dialects dependant on area)
- Dialects: Different varieties within the dialects. The area of Lancashire over the Sands has long been seen as separate, as a Northern rather than North-Midland variety. Within the North-Midland dialects, those influenced more by the cities of Liverpool or Manchester have been distinguished.

Language codes
- ISO 639-3: –
- Glottolog: lanc1236
- IETF: en-u-sd-gblan
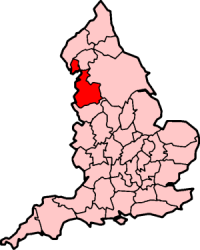
- Lancashire within England, showing ancient extent
- Coordinates: 53°48′0″N 2°36′0″W

Speech example
An example of a female with a non-rhotic accent from Accrington (Jeanette Winterson).

Speech example
An example of a male with a non-rhotic accent from St Helens, formerly part of Lancashire (now Merseyside) (Johnny Vegas).

The Lancashire dialect (or colloquially, Lanky) refers to the Northern English vernacular speech of the English county of Lancashire. The region is notable for its tradition of poetry written in the dialect.

== Scope of Lancashire dialect ==
Lancashire emerged during the Industrial Revolution as a major commercial and industrial region. The county encompassed several hundred mill towns and collieries and by the 1830s, approximately 85% of all cotton manufactured worldwide was processed in Lancashire. It was during this period that most writing in and about the dialect took place, when Lancashire covered a much larger area than it does today (at least from an administrative point of view—the historic county boundary remains unchanged). The administrative county was subject to significant boundary changes in 1974, which removed Liverpool and Manchester with most of their surrounding conurbations to form part of the metropolitan counties of Merseyside and Greater Manchester. At this time, the detached Furness Peninsula and Cartmel (Lancashire over the Sands) were made part of Cumbria, and the Warrington and Widnes areas became part of Cheshire.

The linguist Gerard Knowles noted that Lancashire dialect was still spoken in the city of Liverpool in 1830, before the period of mass immigration from Ireland that led the dialect of the city to change radically. Modern Liverpool speech is usually treated as a separate dialect, named Scouse. In the post-war era, migration to other towns in Merseyside, and also to the new towns created at Runcorn, Skelmersdale and Warrington, has led to an expansion in the area in which Scouse is spoken, as the next generation acquired Scouse speech habits that often displaced the traditional Lancashire or Cheshire dialects of the area.

The area transferred in 1974 to modern Cumbria, known as "Lancashire over the sands", is sometimes also covered as in scope of Cumbrian dialect: for example, The Cumbrian Dictionary of Dialect, Tradition and Folklore was written by the Barrovian William Robinson and included this area. As there was mass migration in the 19th century to Barrow-in-Furness from Ireland, Staffordshire, the Black Country, Scotland and nearby rural areas, it has (like Liverpool) developed a dialect different from the surrounding rural area.

In recent years, some have also classified the speech of Manchester as a separate Mancunian dialect, but this is a much less established distinction. Many of the dialect writers and poets in the 19th and early 20th century were from Manchester and surrounding towns.

== Pronunciation ==
The Lancashire dialect traditionally used rhotic pronunciation, but the accents of much of the area have become non-rhotic since the middle of the 20th century.

== History and research ==
=== Dialect division in the 19th century ===
Alexander John Ellis, one of the first to apply phonetics to English speech, divided the county of Lancashire into four areas. Three of these four were considered North Midland in his categorisation of dialects, whereas the fourth (mostly the section that is in modern Cumbria, known as "Lancashire over the sands") was considered Northern. Dialect isoglosses in England seldom correspond to county boundaries, and an area of Lancashire could have a dialect more similar to an area of a neighbouring county than to a distant area of Lancashire.

Ellis expressly excluded the Scouse dialect of Liverpool from the areas below, although his Area 22 included some sites in modern Merseyside (e.g. Newton-le-Willows, Prescot).

Ellis often spoke of "the Lancashire U" in his work. This was similar to the ʊ in other Northern and North Midland dialects but was actually a more centralised ʊ̈. In addition, the dialects he studied were all rhotic at the time of writing.

Dialect area number	Dialect area name	Distinctive characteristics	Sites in Lancashire	Areas of other counties in same dialect area
21	Southern North Midland	ɐʏ in MOUTH words. ɪŋk for the present participle.	Bury, Failsworth, Manchester, Moston, Oldham, Patricroft, Royton, Rochdale, Stalybridge	Parts of north-east Cheshire and north-west Derbyshire
22	Western North Midland	eː in FACE words. ʊə in GOAT words, although ɔɪ occurs in words such as "coal" and "hole". ɛɪ in some FLEECE words (e.g. "speak").	Blackburn, Bolton, Burnley, Clitheroe, Colne Valley, Earlestown, Farington, Halliwell, Haslingden, Higham, Hoddlesden, Leigh, Leyland, Mellor, Newton-le-Willows, Ormskirk, Penwortham, Prescot, Sabden, Samlesbury, Skelmersdale, St Helens, Walton-le-Dale, Warrington, Westhoughton, Whalley, Wigan, Worsthorne	None. Ellis said that he considered including the Yorkshire sites of Halifax, Huddersfield, Marsden and Saddleworth in this area, but decided to include them in area 24 instead.
23	Northern North Midland	aʊ in MOUTH words. ɑɪ in PRICE words.	Abbeystead, Blackpool, Garstang, Goosnargh, Kirkham, Poulton-le-Fylde, Preston, Wyresdale	Isle of Man
31	West Northern	ia in FACE words. eɪ in FLEECE words. aɪ in PRICE words. iʊ in GOOSE words. ʊu in MOUTH words.	Broughton-in-Furness, Cark-in-Cartmel, Caton, Cockerham, Coniston, Dalton, Heysham, High Nibthwaite, Hornby, Lancaster, Lower Holker, Morecambe, Newton-in-Furness, Quernmore, Skerton, Ulverston	All of Westmorland, south and central Cumberland, south Durham and northwest Yorkshire

(Note: Ellis was writing before the lexical sets devised by John C. Wells, but these sets are used here for comparisons with other articles on Wikipedia. Ellis's equivalent was a system of letters as represented in early West Saxon speech.)

=== Dialect glossaries ===
A number of dialect glossaries were published in the 18th and 19th Centuries, often by philologists who were interested in the old words retained in certain dialects.

- Glossary of provincial words used in the neighbourhood of Ashton-under-Lyne, Mr. Barnes, 1846.
- Glossary of provincial words used in the neighbourhood of Ormskirk, W Hawkstead Talbot, 1846.
- The Dialect of South Lancashire, or Tom Bobbin's Tummus and Meary; with his rhymes and an enlarged glossary of words and phrases, chiefly used by the rural population of the manufacturing districts of South Lancashire, Samuel Bamford, 1854.
- A Glossary of the Dialect of the Hundred of Lonsdale, North and South of the Sands, in the County of Lancaster; together with an essay on some leading characteristics of the dialects spoken in the six northern counties of England (ancient Northumbria), JC Atkinson, 1869.
- A Glossary of the Words and Phrases of Furness (North Lancashire), RB Peacock, London Phil. Soc. Trans., 1869.
- A Glossary of Rochdale-with-Rossendale Words and Phrases, H Cunliffe, 1886.
- A Blegburn Dickshonary, J Baron, 1891.
- A Grammar Of The Dialect Of Adlington (Lancashire), Karl Andrew Hargreaves, 1904.
- A Grammar Of The Dialect Of Oldham (Lancashire), Karl Georg Schilling, 1906.

Of these, only the works on Oldham and Adlington contain any phonetic notation, and this was in a slightly different code to the modern IPA.

Dialect	Reference	Short vowels	Long vowels	Diphthongs	Triphthongs
Adlington	Hargreaves, 1904	a ɑ e ɪ ɔ ʊ o ə	aː ɑ: eː ɛː iː ɔ: uː oː əː	aɪː aːe eiː iːə ʊə ɔɪː ɔʊː uɪ ʊiː	aɪə
Oldham	Schilling, 1906	a e ɪ ɔ ʊ o ə	aː eː iː ɔ: uː oː ɜː	aɪ eɪ ɪə aʊ ʊə ɛʊ ɛə ɔɪ ɔə uɪ ɪɛ	

A late-19th-century largely derivative attempt to document the dialect county-wide was A Glossary of the Lancashire Dialect (1875), produced under the Manchester Literary Club. The editors, John H. Nodal and George Milner, noted substantial variation between northern and southern Lancashire and the difficulty of drawing a precise boundary. They aimed to represent pronunciation with a consistent spelling approach and used “Glossic” symbols for pronunciation.

=== Survey of English Dialects and related research ===
Led by Harold Orton at the University of Leeds, the Survey of English Dialects surveyed 313 sites across England, the Isle of Man and some bordering areas of Wales in the 1950s and early 1960s. The Survey recorded the dialect used in fourteen sites in Lancashire. These sites were mostly rural. A second phase, researching more urban areas, had been planned from the outset but financial problems meant that this second phase never occurred and the Survey's coverage was mostly confined to rural parts of England.

The fieldworkers for the sites were Stanley Ellis and Peter Wright. The latter was a native of Fleetwood and wrote his PhD on the dialect, using his father as the principal informant. In 1981, Wright published a book The Lanky Twang: How it is spoke that explained the dialects of Lancashire through a series of illustrations, often humorous.

The table below shows the sites as reported in Book 1 of the Survey's outputs for the northern counties.

Code	Site	Date survey administered	Number of informants	Fieldworker	Tape recording made
La13	Bickerstaffe, west Lancashire	28 June – 1 July 1955	2	Stanley Ellis	No
La2	Cartmel, modern south Cumbria	28 May – 6 June 1954	3	Stanley Ellis	Yes, not survey respondent
La1	Coniston, modern south Cumbria	20–25 April 1955	2	Stanley Ellis	Yes, survey respondent
La4	Dolphinholme, near Lancaster	21–25 May 1954	3	Stanley Ellis	Yes, survey respondent
La11	Eccleston, near Chorley	23–26 March 1954	3	Stanley Ellis	Yes, survey respondent
La5	Fleetwood	1954 intermittently	4	Peter Wright	Yes, survey respondent
La14	Halewood, near Liverpool	29 March – 3 April 1954	3	Stanley Ellis	No
La12	Harwood, near Bolton	16–23 February 1954	2	Stanley Ellis	Yes, survey respondent
La10	Marshside, Southport	8–13 April 1954	4	Stanley Ellis	Yes, survey respondent
La6	Pilling, Fylde coast	24–29 January 1952	3	Peter Wright	No
La9	Read, near Burnley	3–7 March 1954	2	Stanley Ellis	Yes, survey respondent
La8	Ribchester, between Blackburn and Preston	11–17 March 1954	4	Stanley Ellis	Yes, survey respondent
La7	Thistleton, on the Fylde near Blackpool	19–23 January 1952	4	Peter Wright	No
La3	Yealand, near Lancaster	20–25 April 1955	2	Stanley Ellis	No

There were several other monographs written by dialectologists by Harold Orton's department at the University of Leeds, including some urban areas such as Bury, Middleton, St. Helens and Southport. These are now contained in the Archive of Vernacular Culture at the Brotherton Library in Leeds.

The site of Harwood (La12) was later included in the UNESCO-funded Atlas Linguarum Europae. The results of this survey have attracted little attention.

== Modern research ==
=== Bolton area ===
Graham Shorrocks, a linguist from Farnworth, conducted a series of research projects on the dialect of the Bolton area. These were consolidated into two linked books named A Grammar of the Dialect of the Bolton Area, published in 1998 and 1999.

In addition, the Harwood area of Bolton, which had been a site in the Survey of English Dialects, was made into a site for the Europe-wide linguistic project Atlas Linguarum Europae.

John C. Wells, who grew up in Up Holland, made some passing comments on Lancastrian speech (mostly on the southern parts of the county) in his 1982 series of books, Accents of English.

- In central Lancashire, words such as coal and hole are pronounced with the [ɔɪ] vowel, giving [kɔɪl] and [ɔɪl].
- In southern parts of Lancashire such as the Bolton and Oldham areas, the MOUTH vowel is [ɘʏ] or [ʌʏ]. This can be heard clearly in the pronunciation of the word 'roundabout' in these areas.
- In much of the area around Manchester, the GOOSE vowel is fronted [ʏ:].
- The lexical sets for NURSE and SQUARE are both realised with the same vowel [ɜ:]. This is known as the square–nurse merger, although (as in most of the North of England) many NURSE words are pronounced with a short schwa ə so that curse is pronounced kəs in non-rhotic areas.
- The final vowel in words such as happy and city is a short [ɪ] rather than the [i:] of most other English dialects.
- The word one is usually pronounced [wɔn] rather than the [wʌn] of Received Pronunciation or the [wʊn] in other parts of Northern England.
- In the southern half of Lancashire, there is no NG-coalescence, so words such as finger and singer rhyme.
- Rhoticity persists residually in some areas of Lancashire, though non-rhoticity certainly characterises the more urban areas around Liverpool, Manchester or Wigan. Rhoticity in Lancashire has been increasingly giving way to non-rhoticity since the second half of the 20th century.
- The consonants p, t, k are usually not post-aspirated (as they are in most other dialects) in the Pennine valleys, for example around Burnley.

=== The Dialects of England regions ===
The linguist Peter Trudgill specified a "Central Lancashire" dialect region, defined particularly by its rhoticity, around Blackburn, Preston and the northern parts of Greater Manchester. He classified the county of Merseyside, excluding the St Helens borough and Southport, as another dialect region. Trudgill grouped most of Greater Manchester in the "Northwest Midlands" region, and grouped the non-rhotic northern parts of Lancashire in with Cumbria and most of Yorkshire in the "Central North" region.

=== BBC Voices Survey ===
In 2005 and 2006, the BBC, working with the University of Leeds, undertook a survey of the speech of the country. The recordings are now available on the British Library's website. An accompanying book, Talking for Britain: a journey through the voices of a nation, was published in 2005; the author noted that the speech of Lancashire in 2005 differed markedly from "the impenetrable tracts of rural Lancastrian that the Survey of English Dialects found in the 1950s".

=== Other research ===
Academic analysis of the corpus of Lancashire dialect writing and poetry has continued into the 21st century. Areas of research include identifying the syntax of the dialect, methods of oral performance, the lexicography of dialect words, and the relationship between dialect and social class in the United Kingdom.

== Culture ==
=== Poetry and other literature ===
Graham Shorrocks wrote that Lancashire has been the county with the strongest tradition of dialect poetry since the mid-19th century. Many of these gave commentaries on the poverty of the working class at the time and occasional political sentiments: for example, the ballad Jone o Grinfilt portrayed an unemployed handloom worker who would rather die as a soldier in a foreign war than starve at home. Vicinus argued that, after 1870, dialect writing declined in quality owing to "clichés and sentimentality". Writing in 1999, Shorrocks argues that "Many dialect writers nowadays cannot speak dialect, or cannot speak it in any convincing fashion, and much of what is written seems exhausted, poor, and, crucially, detached from living speech. Lancashire dialect writing, at least in the nineteenth and the early twentieth century, often drew on Lancashire folklore.

The Lancashire Authors Association was founded in 1909 and still exists for writers in the dialect, producing an annual paper called The Record.

Some dialect poets include:

- Benjamin Brierley (often known as Ben Brierley) (1825–1896) was a writer in Lancashire dialect; he wrote poems and a considerable number of stories of Lancashire life. He began to contribute articles to local papers in the 1850s and in 1863 he definitely took to journalism and literature, publishing in the same year his Chronicles of Waverlow.
- John Collier, writing under the name Tim Bobbin, published more than 100 editions of "A View of the Lancashire Dialect".
- Sam Fitton of Rochdale (1868–1923)
- Nicholas Freeston (1907–1978) was an English poet who spent most of his working life as a weaver in cotton mills near his home in Clayton-le-Moors, Lancashire. He published five books of poetry, occasionally writing in Lancashire dialect, and won 15 awards including a gold medal presented by the president of the United Poets' Laureate International.
- Samuel Laycock (1826–1893) was a dialect poet who recorded in verse the vernacular of the Lancashire cotton workers.
- Joseph Ramsbottom (1831–1901)
- Margaret Rebecca Lahee (10 May 1831 – 14 June 1895), was an Irish Lancashire dialect writer from the 19th century who wrote in prose rather than verse.
- Thomas Thompson was a Lancashire dialect author and BBC broadcaster. Born in Bury in 1880, he lived there all his life until his death in 1951. He published 16 books on Lancashire people and their communities, published by George Allen and Unwin. In 1950, he was awarded an honorary master's degree by Manchester University for his scholarly contribution to dialect literature.
- Edwin Waugh whose most famous poem was "Come whoam to thi childer an' me", written in 1856.
- Michael Wilson of Manchester (1763–1840) and his sons Thomas and Alexander.

Dialect poets have occasionally appeared on the BBC since its establishment. Sam Smith featured on the radio in the 1920s. In the 2010s, BBC radio programmes analysed the Manchester Ballads (which featured dialect) and reported on contemporary poets that kept the tradition of dialect poetry alive.

In April 2011, Pendle Borough Council printed phrases from local dialect poems on stone-cube artworks in the area.

In November 2016, Simon Rennie from Exeter University announced his collection of Lancashire dialect poetry from the time of the Lancashire Cotton Famine of 1861–65. He said, "It's fascinating how people turned to and used poetry, in their local languages, to express the impact events so far away were having on them."

=== Organizations and media ===
The Lancashire Dialect Society was founded in 1951; The Journal of the Lancashire Dialect Society has included articles on the Survey of English Dialects and on the dialects of Germany, Switzerland and the United States. The society collected a library of publications relating to dialect studies which was kept at the John Rylands University Library of Manchester from 1974 onwards. This collection was afterwards taken away and deposited at the Lancashire County Library in Preston.

The Lancashire Authors' Association is devoted to the study of Lancashire literature, history, traditions and dialect. The Association’s library collection was founded in Horwich in 1921 and contains dialect works by authors including Edwin Waugh, Samuel Laycock and Teddy Ashton. The collection has been housed at public libraries across Lancashire, and was moved to the University of Bolton Library in 2021.

Various newspapers in Lancashire and the magazine Lancashire Life have included content relating to the Lancashire dialect. R. G. Shepherd contributed many articles interesting both for their philosophy and their excursions into local dialect to The West Lancashire Gazette and The Fleetwood Chronicle. Dialect has also featured in The Bolton Journal, The Leigh Reporter and The Lancashire Evening Post as well as in "Mr. Manchester's diary" in The Manchester Evening News.

Between 1979 and 2015, the North West Sound Archive contained a range of records in Lancashire dialect (as well as Cumberland and Westmorland dialect). The Archive closed owing to financial reasons in 2015, and its materials were relocated to the Manchester Central Library, Liverpool Central Library, and the Lancashire Archives.

=== In film ===
Films from the early part of the 20th century, particularly those produced by Mancunian Films, often contain Lancashire dialect: the films of George Formby, Gracie Fields and Frank Randle are some examples.

The 2018 film Peterloo used reconstructed Lancashire dialect from the early 19th century, based on the works of Samuel Bamford, who was portrayed in the film.

=== In music ===
Similarly, in music, the Lancashire dialect is often used in regional folk songs. The folk song "Poverty Knock" is one of the best-known songs of such nature, describing life in a Lancashire cotton mill. The Houghton Weavers is a band formed in 1975 that continues to sing in Lancashire dialect. In 1979, the Houghton Weavers presented a series on local folk music on BBC North West entitled Sit thi deawn.

The band the Lancashire Hotpots, from St Helens, have also used the Lancashire dialect in their work, particularly for humour.

== Sound recordings ==
- Aspey, Vera (1976) The Blackbird. Topic Records 12TS356
- Boardman, Harry (1973) A Lancashire Mon: ballads, songs & recitations. Topic Records, London 12TS236
- Boardman, Harry (1978) Golden Stream: Lancashire songs and rhymes. AK Records, Manchester AK 7813
- Kershaw, Mary & Harvey (1976) Lancashire Sings Again! songs & poems in the Lancashire dialect. Topic Records 12TS302
- Survey of English Dialects: recordings from Lancashire (circa 1950s)
- 20th Century Lancastrian speech
- Sound Comparisons: Rossendale
