= Arthur Appleby =

English cricketer

Personal information
- Full name: Arthur Appleby
- Born: 22 July 1843; Clayton-le-Moors, Lancashire, England
- Died: 24 October 1902 (aged 59); Clayton-le-Moors, Lancashire, England
- Batting: Left-handed
- Bowling: Round arm left-arm fast-medium

Domestic team information
- Years: Team
- 1866–87: Lancashire
- First-class debut: 23 August 1866 Lancashire v Surrey
- Last First-class: 11 July 1887 Gentlemen v Players

Career statistics
Competition	FC
Matches	81
Runs scored	1249
Batting average	11.45
100s/50s	-/2
Top score	99
Balls bowled	15085
Wickets	336
Bowling average	15.67
5 wickets in innings	24
10 wickets in match	3
Best bowling	9/25
Catches/stumpings	56/–
- Source: CricketArchive, 11 October 2008

Arthur Appleby (22 July 1843 – 24 October 1902) was an English first-class cricketer. A left arm round arm medium pace bowler and left-handed batsman, he played 58 matches for Lancashire as an amateur between 1866 and 1887 and in 81 first-class matches in total. He also appeared for Marylebone Cricket Club (1874), the Gentlemen (1867–1887), North of England (1869–1873), Gentlemen of the North (1870–1879), Gentlemen of Marylebone Cricket Club (1873), Gentlemen of England (1874–1878), and RA FitzGerald's XI (1872) and in the Gentlemen to Canada Touring Team (1873).

Bowling was his strongest suit, with 9 for 25 against Sussex being his best innings analysis. He took 5 wickets in an innings on 24 occasions and ten wickets in a match 3 times. He never made a first-class century, falling just one run short against Yorkshire in a Roses Match.

He was born at Enfield, Clayton-le-Moors, Lancashire, on 22 July 1843, the son of mill owner Joseph Appleby. Educated at Grange School, Thorp Arch, near Tadcaster he began his playing days at Enfield Cricket Club where he was coached by John Berry and W. H. Iddison. He played in 58 matches for Lancashire between 1866 and 1887 and in 81 first-class matches in total.

In later life he assumed control of the family firm and, amongst other directorships, sat on the board of the Leeds and Liverpool Canal. He was an Alderman of the Lancashire County Council and Chairman of the County Bench, sitting at Church. He died at Mill House, Enfield, Clayton-le-Moors, Lancashire, on 24 October 1902.
