= Nicholas Freeston =

English poet

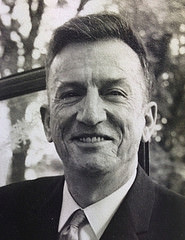
- Born: 28 August 1907; Kendal, Westmorland, England
- Died: 6 February 1978 (aged 70); Accrington, Lancashire, England
- Occupations: Poet, weaver
- Spouse(s): Rose Freeston (d. 1977)
- Children: Roy, Brian, Carole

Nicholas Freeston (28 August 1907 – 6 February 1978) was an English poet who spent most of his working life as a weaver in cotton mills near his home in Clayton-le-Moors, Lancashire. He published five books of poetry, occasionally writing in Lancashire dialect, and won fifteen awards including a gold medal presented by the president of the United Poets' Laureate International. He was listed in the third edition of Who's Who in the World and appeared on television and radio reading his own work. A UK national newspaper, the Daily Mirror, called him the "Cotton Mill Bard" and the Lancashire Evening Telegraph, the "Wordsworth of the Weaving Shed".

== Early life ==
Nicholas Freeston was born in Kendal, Westmorland in August 1907 and moved with his family to Clayton-le-Moors, Lancashire, at the age of 8. One of ten children, he started work in a cotton mill aged 12. According to a Daily Mirror profile of the poet from 1963, the first verse of one of his poems captured the challenges of his early life:

"A silver spoon was never mine. I cut my teeth on tears. And all the things that men call fine have passed me down the years."

He took a correspondence course in English during the economic depression of the 1930s when he was out of work for six years, but it was 1947 before his first poem was published. The Lancashire Evening Telegraph described how he bolstered his learning by taking evening classes with the Workers' Educational Association and reading immense amounts of poetry.

== Poetry ==
Nicholas Freeston published his first book of poetry, Christmas Bells and Other Poems, in 1950, followed by The House of the Croft in 1952 and The First Christmas in 1953. He was able to publish the books thanks to the generosity of local patrons. A profile of the poet in the Northern Daily Telegraph, a local newspaper, told how Freeston had the 'unusual hobby' of writing poetry after working by day as a weaver at Messrs. Hindle and Warburton's Oakenshaw Mill [in Clayton-le-Moors]. Asked if his job was a barrier to writing poetry, he told the newspaper: "Not a bit of it. It is an asset. I get a lot of my ideas at the loom".

In 1955 the BBC radio presenter Wilfred Pickles selected two of Nicholas Freeston's poems for inclusion in an anthology of poetry and prose of the 'north counties' of England. The book, My North Countrie, featured Freeston's Lancashire dialect verses, 'Th' Art Lookin' Sackless' and 'A Bird Song Away'.

"That he sung to his mate Ah wor never in deawt, Nobbut luv could inspire sich a cry. An' ut th'end uv his song Coom her answerin' sheawt, Fro' a stately owd Cherry nearby."

In the same year as the publication of Pickles' anthology, Freeston published his fourth book, a collection of his own poems priced two shillings. He donated proceeds from the book's sale to Nazareth House, a charity in Blackburn, Lancashire.

Freeston's final book, a collection of 65 poems, was published in 1966, in response to numerous requests for his work. The book featured 'The Blackbird in Delph Road', a reference to Birtwistle and Fielding's Delph Road Mill, Great Harwood, where he worked the night-shift in the weaving shed. The poem 'Paddy' was dedicated to an Irish man he worked with, who was, according to the Accrington Observer, "a great walker and bird-watcher until he died at the age of 93":

"Ah'm gradely fain that Fate decreed That he should pass my way."

The book also included the semi-autobiographical verse, 'Above the Din', which was brought to a much wider audience a year earlier in a profile of the poet in the Daily Mail newspaper. The profile described how Freeston found inspiration for his poetry in the loneliness of 'the deafening clash of the looms' in a weaving shed where he worked the night-shift:

"Above the din of the looms I heard the splendid song of a happy bird. And the message there was plain to me of the things to come, of the joys to be."

Freeston described being completely alone in the noise of the weaving shed, "I could never lip-read so I composed 200 poems and committed them to paper during my supper break". When he was interviewed about his poetry by the Lancashire Evening Telegraph in 1970, he was working as a weaver in a cotton mill in Oswaldtwistle, the Lancashire town where James Hargreaves, the inventor of the revolutionary textile machine the spinning jenny, was born in the early 18th century. Freeston told the Telegraph, "I find beauty in the world about me. You have to look for beauty in ugly surroundings. This is what I do and it gives me great solace". Freeston explained how he could only write when he could feel and see the words in pictures. "I'm not one of those commercial poets who can write to order", he said, explaining how he thought of his poems at the loom or walking along the street: "I recall something that has struck me during a day in the countryside or something remembered from my childhood."

"They laid it low my tree, And why, I never knew, One said - 'twas for its ugliness, And some - it spoiled the view."

== Awards and recognition ==
Nicholas Freeston won fifteen awards for his Lancashire dialect and lyric poetry, and by the time of his death in 1978, was listed in the third edition of Who's Who in the World. The Accrington Observer, the weekly newspaper for Accrington and the surrounding area, known as Hyndburn, called him the borough's "Premier Poet" for his "pure-as-crystal poetry". Despite the recognition, he insisted: "The weaving shed is really as far as I expected to be known".

- United Poets' Laureate International - In 1965 Nicholas Freeston was presented with a gold medal by the president of the United Poets' Laureate International (UPLI), Dr. Amado Yuzon. It was for outstanding work as a lyric poet. Dr. Yuzon travelled from the organisation's headquarters in the Philippines to attend the award ceremony at the Clayton-le-Moors council chamber. The UPLI, which was based in Quezon City in the Philippines, gave awards to poets throughout the world. Freeston was one of four Britons to receive the honour; the then Poet Laureate, John Masefield, was another. Freeston told the Daily Mirror, "I'm thrilled to get the medal, particularly when I look at the famous names on the award list."
- Dictionary of International Biography - Freeston received a certificate of merit for 'distinguished service to regional poetry', awarded by the editorial board of the Dictionary of International Biography in 1965. In 1963, when his poetry first earned him a mention in the same publication, his inclusion, as a cotton mill worker, alongside such famous names as David Attenborough and Sir John Barbirolli, resulted in attention from UK national newspapers. He featured in the Daily Herald and the Daily Mirror. The latter, citing his fellow mill workers, referred to him as the 'Cotton Mill Bard'.
- Lancashire Authors' Association - In the 1950s three poems gained premier awards in the annual cup competitions of the Lancashire Authors' Association. 'The First Christmas' won the 'Batty Cup' in 1954 and the Lancashire dialect verses Th'art Lookin' Sackless' and 'Th'owd Blackbird' were awarded the Lancashire Authors' Association's 'Scholes Cup' in 1952 and 1950 respectively.

"Coom, coom neaw Johnny Yella-bill, Coom, stop that merry din. Ah fear tha'll bust thi precious heart, An' that would bi a sin."

== Television and radio ==
Nicholas Freeston made a number of appearances on television and radio in the north west of England:

- 1960 - Granada Television - People and Places - interviewed by Bill Grundy. Freeston recited 'Th'owd Blackbird'.
- 1963 - BBC Look North - filmed at home at 79 Barnes Street, Clayton-le-Moors and at work in Great Harwood. He read 'The Tree in the Croft' and 'The Blackbird in Delph Road'.
- 1965 - BBC Voice of the North radio programme - reading two poems, 'Above the Din' and 'Blind Sally'.
- 1965 - Granada Television - Scene at 6-30 - filmed at work in the weaving shed at Birtwistle and Fielding's Delph Road Mill, Great Harwood, after which he read his poems 'The Poet' and 'The Robin'.

One of his poems was broadcast by the actress Violet Carson who played Ena Sharples in the British television soap opera, Coronation Street. She read 'Th' Art Lookin' Sackless' on the BBC North regional children's hour programme, Lancashire Hot Pot.

"Th'art lookin' sackless, Speckled Breast. As sackless as con be. Coom up! an' spooart thi mottled vest an' pipe a toon fer me."

== Music ==
Some of Nicholas Freeston's poems were set to music by Ivy Mason Whipp and performed by, among others, the Oswaldtwistle born opera singer Vivian Townley. The poems set to music were 'The Stream', 'A Bird Song Away', 'The Thrush' and 'They Sweeten Time', all published by Boosey and Hawkes. Freeston's works have been performed on BBC radio by the singers Cynthia Glover, Gladys New, Donald Pilley and Raymond Budd of Black and White Minstrels fame. Pauline Darrell sang 'The Stream' in The Grand Hotel on the BBC Light Programme in 1967. A performance of 'The Stream' featured on the 1972 album 'Sounds Like North Cornwall'.

"There flowed through Heav'n a lovely stream, I saw its splendour in my dream, I saw child-angels at their play, Take stars from out the Milky Way....."

== Publications ==
Nicholas Freeston published five books of poetry between 1950 and 1966:

- Christmas Bells and Other Poems (1950)
- The House in the Croft and Other Poems (1952)
- The First Christmas and Other Poems (1953)
- Collected Poems (1955)
- Poems (1966)

All the books are still available at various Lancashire County Council libraries.
