= Barrovian =

English-language dialect

- Barronese
- Native to: England United Kingdom
- Region: Barrow-in-Furness Cumbria
- Ethnicity: English
- Language family: Indo-European: Germanic; West Germanic; North Sea Germanic; Anglo-Frisian; Anglic; Anglian; North Anglic; Northern English; Cumbrian; Barrovian
- Early forms: Old English: Northumbrian Old English; Northern Middle English; Early Modern English

Language codes
- ISO 639-3: –
- IETF: en-u-sd-gbcma

Location of Barrow within England

Barrovian (or Barronese) is an accent and dialect of English found in Barrow-in-Furness and several outlying settlements in Cumbria, England, historically in the county of Lancashire. Although a member of the Cumbrian dialect, the Barrovian and south Cumbria accent has much in common with the dialect of northern Lancashire, particularly the Lancaster/Morecambe area.

Barrovian is also used as a demonym for the inhabitants of Barrow.

== Origins ==
Up until the mid-19th century Barrow was nothing but a cluster of small villages with the Cumbrian dialect prevailing throughout. Huge growth occurred, however, between 1860 and 1880, spurred by the introduction of a railway to the Furness peninsula and the rapidly expanding steel and jute works. Barrow also became a major shipbuilding centre in the early 20th century. From a few thousand to 70,000 residents in under half a century, the majority of these were immigrants to the town drawn by the burgeoning industries. Large influxes came from elsewhere in Lancashire, Ireland (especially the counties of Antrim and Tyrone) and Scotland, with existing shipbuilding regions such as the Clyde and Tyneside providing a significant percentage of migrants in the early to mid-20th century. During the 1890s, one-sixth of the local population had been born in Ireland or Scotland. Barrow became a melting pot of accents and dialects and although it remains primarily Cumbria/Lancashire-oriented it has strong influences from a wide geographical area.

Numerous place names in Barrow are of Old Norse and Celtic origin. Although they have long been Anglicised, many have had their pronunciation skewed over time by the aforementioned immigrant groups. One notable example is the suburbs of Roose which was settled by Cornish tin miners and is now pronounced locally with a 'z' in place of the 's'. The name Furness is also pronounced to sound like 'furnace'.

== Phonology ==
A 2005 study of the Barrovian dialect by the British Library found a number of traits common amongst the populace. Most of the observations made are similar to other Northern English dialects with the sound /ʌ/ (as in 'up' or 'mother') being pronounced /ʊ/ (as in 'good' or 'put'). Other observations made included frequent T-glottalization on last letters and frequent intervocalic and syllable initial T-glottaling. In Plain English this can be described as the letter 't' being dropped from the middle or end of words. Examples of this include the word 'cart' (/kɑrt/) being pronounced as 'car' (/kaːʔ/), with a Glottal stop after the letter 'r'. Alternatively the number 'twenty' (/twɛnti/) could be pronounced 'twen-y' (/twɛnʔi/). The same study also found frequent G-dropping, H-dropping and Th-fronting. Respective examples of these phonetics include: 'freezing, exciting, sleeping' being pronounced 'freezin, excitin, sleepin' (where G-dropping speakers pronounce the -ing syllable as [ɪn], while non-G-dropping speakers have /ɪŋ/); 'appy (/hæpi/), hour (/haʊ.wər/), have (/hæv)' being pronounced 'appy (/æpi/), our (/aʊə/), ave (/æv)' with removal of the front '/h/'; and 'through (/θru/), thought (/θɒːt), three (/θri/)' being pronounced as 'frough (/fru/), frought (/frɒːt/), free (/fri/)'.

Pronunciation of words ending with the sound 'ure' (/ˈu:r/) are another distinct indicator of the Barrovian dialect. Some words drop the /u:/ completely and convert the 're' (/r/) to 'er' (/ər/), Examples of this include the word 'brochure' being pronounced 'broch-er' (/ˈbroːʃə/), 'texture' as 'text-er' (/ˈtɛkstʃə/) and 'figure' as 'fig-er' (/ˈfɪgə/). Alternatively many words containing /ˈu:r/ are pronounced /u:.ər/ (e.g. in the Barrovian dialect 'moor' rhymes with 'truer'). Further examples being: 'cure' (/ˈkjʊər/) pronounced 'kyou-er' (/ˈkjɪuə/), 'tour' (/tʊər/) as 'too-er' (ˈtɪuə), 'mature' as 'ma-chou-er' (/ˈməˈtʃɪuə/) and 'secure' as 'sec-you-er' (/səkˈjɪuə/). There is no convention for which words drop the letter 'u' and which emphasise it, with little correlation between word length and pronunciation.

== Phrases and lexis ==
The words 'dead' and 'well' are often used in conversation to mean 'very' or make a strong point, for example "it was well good", or "it was dead bad". The word 'like' is frequently used with little meaning, as is the term 'and that' which roughly translates to the use of the term 'etc.' in a spoken conversation. For example, "I bought some crisps and biscuits and that"

(a boughʔ sʊm crisps’n biscuits n’aʔ). The list below contains common words and daily greetings in Standard English (in bold) and their Barrovian equivalent (in italics), and examples of use in a sentence or phrase (in parentheses).

- **I** - a (a went out last night)
- **Anything** - aught/owt
- **Barrow** - Barra
- **Clothes** - clobber
- **Drunk** - ratted, off your head (off yer’ead), recked
- **Going on a trip or walk** - going on a bod
- **Hello** - iya
- **Him/Her** - im/er
- **Here you go** - eer yare
- **How are you** - Ow are ya (owar-y) or (y')oriʔe or oreeʔ
- **Later** - after
- **Me** - us (leave us alone)
- **Moody** - mardy
- **Mother** - mam
- **Nothing** - nowt
- **Playing truant** - jigging
- **Saw** - sin (I sin her yesterday in town)
- **Something** - summat
- **Trousers** - kecks, pants
- **Unfair** - tight
- **Where are you?** - where y'aʔ?
- **Where are you going?** - where y'off?
- **We** - us (us two)
- **Up to no good** - Shithouse
- **You (plural)** - Youse / yous referring to a group of people

== Barrovian as a demonym ==
'Barrow bastard' is also used to refer to an individual hailing from Barrow. For some the term has become synonymous with local football team Barrow A.F.C. The term 'Old Barrovian' was used in the 20th century to refer to alumni of the Barrow Boy and Girl Grammar Schools, which through a complicated history has become Furness Academy.

== Recognition ==
Outside of North West England, Barrovian is relatively unknown in comparison to more widespread dialects. A poll conducted by Travelodge in 2014 resulted in Barrovian being placed sixth 'least favourite' of regional accents in the UK behind Essex, Brummie, Cockney, Belfast and Highland respectively.

== See also ==
- List of dialects of the English language
  - Northern England English
    - Cumbrian dialect
    - Lancashire dialect and accent
    - Geordie
    - Manchester dialect
    - Scouse
  - Scottish English
    - Glasgow patter
