= Manchester dialect =

Northern English accent and dialect

- Mancunian, Manc
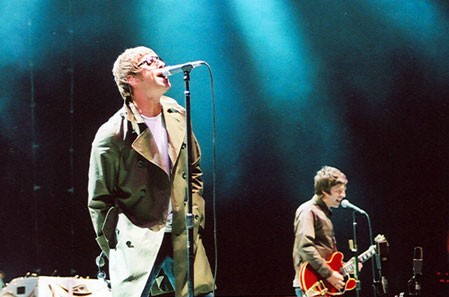
- Liam and Noel Gallagher of Oasis
- Native to: England
- Region: Greater Manchester
- Language family: Indo-European: Germanic; West Germanic; Ingvaeonic; Anglo-Frisian; Anglic; Anglian; North Anglic; Northern English; Manchester dialect
- Writing system: English alphabet

Language codes
- ISO 639-3: –
- IETF: en-u-sd-gbman
- Manchester in red, Greater Manchester in light yellow

Speech example
An example of a male speaker from Old Trafford (Terry Christian).

Speech example
An example of a male speaker from Hattersley, Hyde (Ricky Hatton).

Manchester dialect or Manchester English, known informally as Mancunian (/mænˈkjuːniən/ man-KEW-nee-ən) or Manc, is the English accent and dialect variations native to Manchester and some of the Greater Manchester area of England. Sharing features with both West Midlands and Northern English, it is closely related to its neighbours like the Lancashire dialect and the West Riding dialect of Yorkshire.

Manchester accents are prominent in popular media via television soap operas such as Coronation Street and members of rock bands such as Happy Mondays, New Order, Oasis, the Fall, the Stone Roses, and Take That.

== History ==
Manchester was the birthplace of the Industrial Revolution and at the start of the 18th century had a population of around 10,000 but by the start of the 20th century had a population of around 700,000. The history of Manchester shows that, from the Industrial Revolution onwards, the city was settled by migrants from many countries, notably from Ireland and other areas of the United Kingdom, Eastern Europe, Italy and Germany. In modern times, greater numbers have arrived from the Indian subcontinent and the West Indies. It is argued that Manchester today is the second most polyglot city after London, creating a melting pot of languages, accents and dialects. An evolving and cosmopolitan city with many different immigrant groups, Manchester has some features that stand out from the wider Lancashire dialect, though distinctions between the Northern English accents exist along a dialect continuum and are also influenced by demographic factors such as age, economic status, gender, etc. Manchester shares features with its neighbouring twin city of Salford, which was home to Manchester docks and could further explain the creation and emergence of an accent different from other nearby towns.

=== Research ===
Throughout the 19th century and for most of the 20th century, speech in Manchester was considered part of the Lancashire dialect, with many of the 19th-century Lancashire dialect poets coming from Manchester and the surrounding area. In the early 20th century, the Manchester Ballads featured Lancashire dialect extensively. In the 1880s, the early dialectologist Alexander John Ellis included the city in his survey of English speech and placed most of Greater Manchester (excluding the Bolton and Wigan areas) in a dialect district that included north-west Derbyshire.

The 1982 textbook Accents of English by John C. Wells (himself a native of Wigan) includes the Manchester dialect, which he describes as "extremely similar" to the dialect of the West Riding of Yorkshire. His proposed criteria for distinguishing the two are that Mancunians avoid NG-coalescence, so singer /ˈsɪŋɡə/ rhymes with finger /ˈfɪŋɡə/ and king, ring, sing etc. all end with a plosive /ɡ/ sound (/ˈkɪŋɡ, ˈrɪŋɡ, ˈsɪŋɡ/), whereas West Riding residents employ "Yorkshire assimilation", by which voiced consonants change into voiceless consonants in words such as Bradford /ˈbratfəd/, subcommittee /ˈsʊpkəmɪtɪ/ and frogspawn /ˈfrɒkspɔːn/.

In Peter Trudgill's book The Dialects of England, it was classified as part of the "Northwest Midlands" dialect region.

Between 2019 and 2022, a team at Manchester Metropolitan University under linguist Rob Drummond collected data investigating dialect features, dialect perceptions, and linguistic identities across Greater Manchester, with an "Accent Van" travelling around the area to interview residents.

== Geographical coverage ==
The Manchester accent is usually found in Greater Manchester including the cities of Salford and Manchester and also in the immediately adjacent parts of the boroughs of Bury, Oldham, Rochdale, Stockport, Tameside and Trafford. It is also prominent in "overspill" towns and estates such as Hattersley, Gamesley, Handforth and Birchwood. What is known locally as 'Manc' is heard in areas of Central Manchester and neighbouring Salford whilst northern areas of Greater Manchester associate more with traditional Lancashire. The derogatory term 'Yonner' was originally used to describe people from Oldham and Rochdale who spoke with a thick Lancashire accent. It is now often used to describe anyone from the northern boroughs of Greater Manchester who speak with a Lancashire accent.

The urban dialect itself is more distinctive than many people realise, and it is quite noticeably different from the accent spoken in adjacent towns such as Bolton, Oldham, Rochdale and Wigan despite them being within Greater Manchester. The Mancunian accent is less dialect-heavy than neighbouring Lancashire and Cheshire accents, although words such as owt (meaning 'anything') and nowt (meaning 'nothing') remain part of the Mancunian vocabulary.

== Phonology ==
=== General Northern English features ===
The City of Manchester and most other areas of Greater Manchester, such as Stockport and Wigan, are non-rhotic, meaning /r/ is not pronounced unless followed by a vowel. A few parts of Greater Manchester north of the city proper, such as Rochdale and Oldham, may exhibit some residual rhoticity, though this has been continuously declining due to non-rhoticity now spanning the bulk of urban Lancashire (Greater Manchester included).

H-dropping, i.e. the omission of the sound /h/ (e.g. pronouncing head as [ɛd] rather than [hɛd]), is common in speakers of Manchester English, especially among the working class population. Th-fronting, i.e. pronouncing the dental fricatives /θ, ð/ as labio-dental [f, v] (e.g. pronouncing both three and free as free), is also found in Manchester, especially in younger speakers and among working-class men.

Manchester English has also been described as having so-called "dark" (i.e. velarised) /l/ in both onset and coda position (i.e. at the beginning and end of a syllable, e.g. in leap and peel), though some speakers may still have a less dark onset than coda /l/.

Mancunians have no distinction between the STRUT and FOOT vowels, and also the BATH vowel is the same as TRAP, rather than PALM. This means that but and put are rhymes, as are gas and glass (which is not the case in Southern England).

=== Unique Manchester features ===
The unstressed vowel system of Manchester, specifically the final vowels in words such as happY and lettER, is often commented on by outsiders. Phonetically, both vowels are lowered and backed for certain Mancunian speakers. This means that the final vowel in happY sounds most like the vowel in DRESS (rather than the vowel in KIT, as in Yorkshire or other Northern accents, or the vowel in FLEECE, as in many Southern English accents), and the final vowel in lettER is often perceived as being similar to the vowel in LOT (although this has been found to be a slight exaggeration of the true pronunciation).

The GOAT and GOOSE vowels show socioeconomic variation in Manchester. A fronter and more diphthongal GOAT vowel (less like the Lancashire and Yorkshire pronunciations) is positively correlated with higher social classes whereas a fronter GOOSE before /l/ is correlated with lower social classes. In other phonological environments, GOOSE-fronting is found across all social classes.

Manchester is one of the very few areas of England where significant numbers of speakers still resist the horse-hoarse merger, maintaining a distinction between the vowels in the north and force lexical sets, using a more open vowel (roughly [ɒː]) in the former and a closer vowel (roughly [ɔː]) in the latter. Therefore pairs which have become homophones in most of England such as horse and hoarse, war and wore, morning and mourning can remain distinct in Manchester.

Another notable aspect of the phonology of Manchester English is "velar nasal plus" or the retention of [ɡ] after [ŋ] (where it has been lost in almost all other modern varieties of English), such that the words singer and finger rhyme for Manchester speakers, both having a medial [ŋɡ] cluster. Word-final ng clusters likewise often retain the plosive (or are otherwise reduced simply to [n] or sometimes [ŋ]), especially before a pause, where ejective [kʼ] is not an uncommon allophone.

A further trait of Manchester English, especially among younger residents, is the pronunciation of /s/ before /tɹ, tj, tʃ/ as [ʃ] in words such as street, district, stupid, moisture and mischief. This is a phenomenon known as /s/-retraction and is also found in various other varieties of English.

Traditionally, the Manchester area was known for glottal reinforcement of the consonants /p, t, k/, similar to modern speech in North East England. More recent research has found that /t/ most often undergoes full glottal replacement, being realised as a glottal stop [ʔ] rather than as an alveolar plosive with glottal fortification [ʔt], in a process known as t-glottalisation.

In 2021, Manchester Voices published heat maps of the Greater Manchester area highlighting key differences between the accents of Manchester, Salford, Trafford, Stockport and Tameside and the accents of the northern boroughs of Wigan, Bolton, Bury, Rochdale and Oldham. Examples of these differences included bear being pronounced as burr and bus being pronounced as buz almost exclusively in the northern boroughs, where a more traditional Lancastrian accent is spoken as opposed to a more local Mancunian one in the southern boroughs.

== Vocabulary ==
Below are some of the most notable dialectal words, phrases and sayings in Mancunian English. Not all of these are used by the city's entire population:

- bobbins – Rubbish, worthless. Used in place of an expletive when children are present.
- buzzin(g) – Extremely happy.
- cock – Generic term of friendship, like mate or pal.
- dead – An emphasis marker (e.g. dead busy, dead friendly).
- the dibble – The police.
- dimp – Short cigarette, cigarette stub, cigarette butt.
- gaff – A residence, house or flat.
- ginnel – An alleyway, especially when passing beneath a building.
- hangin(g) – Nasty, disgusting (e.g. Karl is 'angin')
- madferit – Full of enthusiasm, a phrase that embodied the Madchester era. From the phrase mad for it.
- mither – To irritate, to annoy or to bother. To moan or to whinge.
- muppet – Fool, idiot.
- our kid – Term of endearment for a sibling or close acquaintance.
- pure – Emphasis on a large quantity, for example 'the gig was pure busy' meaning there were a lot of people there
- safe – To be on good terms, also used to mean 'okay' and as a greeting.
- sappnin(g) – Contraction of what's happening?, now used as a greeting, via sense of 'what are you up to?'
- sayin(g) – Contraction of what are you saying?, now used as a greeting, via sense of 'what are you up to?'
- scran – Food (also used in Liverpool, Cumbria, Glasgow and Newcastle).
- scrike - To cry. To wail or to scream. To shriek or to screech.
- scrote – Someone worthless or unpleasant; a low-life (short for scrotum).
- snide – Mean, tight.
- sorted – Okay/dealt with (sorted out).
- sound – Okay, trustworthy.

Hiberno-English influences from Ireland include the pronunciation of the letter 'h' as /heɪtʃ/ (although this pronunciation is now widespread, being used by approximately 24% of British people born since 1982) and the plural of 'you' as youse/yous. Spoken word performer and poet Argh Kid (David Scott) breaks down Mancunian vocabulary in his piece "Nanna Calls Me Cock".

== Social perceptions ==
In 2015, Manchester Metropolitan University (MMU) produced an accent map of Greater Manchester, based in perceptual dialectology, which showed that the accents of Manchester and Salford were described as "diverse", "rough", and "common", while the word "scally" was also used as a description. However, other popular media outlets have variously described social labels for the dialect, including "twangy", "euphonic", or even one of the "friendliest" accents in the UK. The MMU team's research concluded in 2023, finding that urban varieties within the county tend to be judged negatively relative to rural varieties. Among locals of Greater Manchester itself, the socially unattractive accents are associated with Salford, low social status, and urban areas, whereas socially attractive accents are associated with the northern boroughs, particularly the Bolton–Bury area, which carry social sentiments of quaintness, traditional Lancashire, and possibly rurality.

A 2021 article in The Guardian expressed some of the variation within the county, stating "Greater Manchester is only about 30 miles from east to west but it has long been famed for its linguistic diversity: the rich rolling Rs and extra long 'oos' of the northern mill towns where people looook in coook booooks are a world away from the nasal Mancunian drawl where your brother is 'ahh kid' and words which end in a Y finish instead with an 'eh' (ya cheekeh monkeh)."

== Example speakers ==
Particularly strong examples of the accent can be heard spoken by Davy Jones of the Monkees who was born in Openshaw, Mark E. Smith (Salford-born, Prestwich-raised singer with the Fall), the actor John Henshaw (from Ancoats) and Liam and Noel Gallagher from Burnage band Oasis. The actor Caroline Aherne (raised in Wythenshawe) spoke with a softer, slower version of the accent. Stretford-raised Morrissey – like many Mancunians, from an Irish background – has a local accent with a noticeable lilt inherited from his parents. Salford-born Tony Wilson retained his Mancunian accent, albeit somewhat modified by his upbringing in Marple and his Cambridge education. Salford poet John Cooper Clarke is another example of a working-class Mancunian accent as can be heard in his spoken-word recordings. Also from Salford is comedian Jason Manford, whose Manc accent adds to his comedic style. Other notable Manc speakers include boxer Ricky Hatton (from Hattersley, Hyde) and the actor Bernard Hill (from Blackley). Dominic Monaghan (who grew up in Heaton Moor, Stockport) speaks with a notable Manc accent, and his characters in both Lost and FlashForward have made note of it. Less well known outside of the area, and with pronounced local accents, are local broadcasters Eamonn O'Neal, Mike Sweeney and Jimmy Wagg. The TV broadcaster Terry Christian (from Old Trafford) has a particularly prominent voice. The Mancunian accent is prominent in the locally-set TV series Shameless, The Street and The Royle Family. The character Jack Regan in the 1970s police drama The Sweeney (played by Longsight-born actor John Thaw) is a Mancunian with an accent heavily modified by years of living in London. Another example of a Mancunian speaker is Karl Pilkington, a radio and TV personality who was born in Sale (then part of Cheshire, but now Greater Manchester).

Manchester's most famous soap opera Coronation Street has, despite being based in the city (a fictionalised version of Salford), less pronounced Mancunian accents than other TV shows set in the area. Several of the show's cast members do speak with pronounced Mancunian accents in the series. They include Michelle Keegan (Tina McIntyre), Helen Flanagan (Rosie Webster) and Simon Gregson (Steve McDonald). The West Sussex-raised British actress, Jane Leeves, portrayed the character of Daphne Moon, a Manchester emigrant to Seattle with a supposed Mancunian accent which was actually closer to a broad Lancashire dialect, in the American sitcom Frasier.

== Bibliography ==
- Bailey, George (2018), "Emerging from below the social radar: Incipient evaluation in the North West of England", Journal of Sociolinguistics, 23 (1): 3–28, doi:10.1111/josl.12307
- Bailey, George (2019), "Ki(ng) in the north: Effects of duration, boundary, and pause on post-nasal [ɡ]-presence", Laboratory Phonology, 10 (3): 3, doi:10.5334/labphon.115
- Bailey, George; Nichols, Stephen; Turton, Danielle; Baranowski, Maciej (2022), "Affrication as the cause of /s/-retraction: Evidence from Manchester English", Glossa: A Journal of General Linguistics, 7 (1), doi:10.16995/glossa.8026, hdl:20.500.11820/e2af656c-ef95-42eb-be5e-f69613b02883
- Baranowski, Maciej; Turton, Danielle (2015), "Manchester English", in Raymond, Hickey (ed.), Researching Northern English, Amsterdam: John Benjamins, ISBN 978-90-272-6767-2
- Baranowski, Maciej (2017), "Class matters: the sociolinguistics of GOOSE and GOAT in Manchester English", Language Variation and Change, 29 (3): 301–339, doi:10.1017/s0954394517000217
- Bermúdez-Otero, Ricardo; Bailey, George; Baranowski, Maciej; Turton, Danielle (2017), The phonological lexicon, usage factors, and rates of change: evidence from Manchester English (PDF), Leipzig, Germany: ConSOLE XXV
- Ellis, Alexander John (1889), "Part V: The existing phonology of English dialects compared with that of West Saxon speech", On Early English Pronunciation, London: Truebner & Co
- Lodge, K. R. (June 1978), "A Stockport Teenager", Journal of the International Phonetic Association, 8 (1–2), Cambridge: 69–70, doi:10.1017/s0025100300001730, S2CID 145764872
- Turton, Danielle (2014), Variation in English /l/: Synchronic reflections of the life cycle of phonological processes (PhD thesis), University of Manchester
- Turton, Danielle (2017), "Categorical or gradient? An ultrasound investigation of /l/-darkening and vocalization in varieties of English", Laboratory Phonology, 8 (1), doi:10.5334/labphon.35
- Turton, Danielle; Ramsammy, Michael (2012), "/ɪ, ə/-lowering in Manchest[ʌ]: contextual patterns of gradient and categorical variabilit[ɛ̈]" (PDF), The 20th Manchester Phonology Meeting, Manchester: University of Manchester
- Wells, John C. (September 1970), "Local Accents in England and Wales", Journal of Linguistics, 6 (2), Cambridge: Cambridge University Press: 231–252, doi:10.1017/s0022226700002632, S2CID 143523909
- Wells, John C. (1982), Accents of English, Vol. 2: The British Isles (pp. i–xx, 279–466), Cambridge University Press, doi:10.1017/CBO9780511611759, ISBN 0-52128540-2
