= William Percy (portrait artist) =

English painter

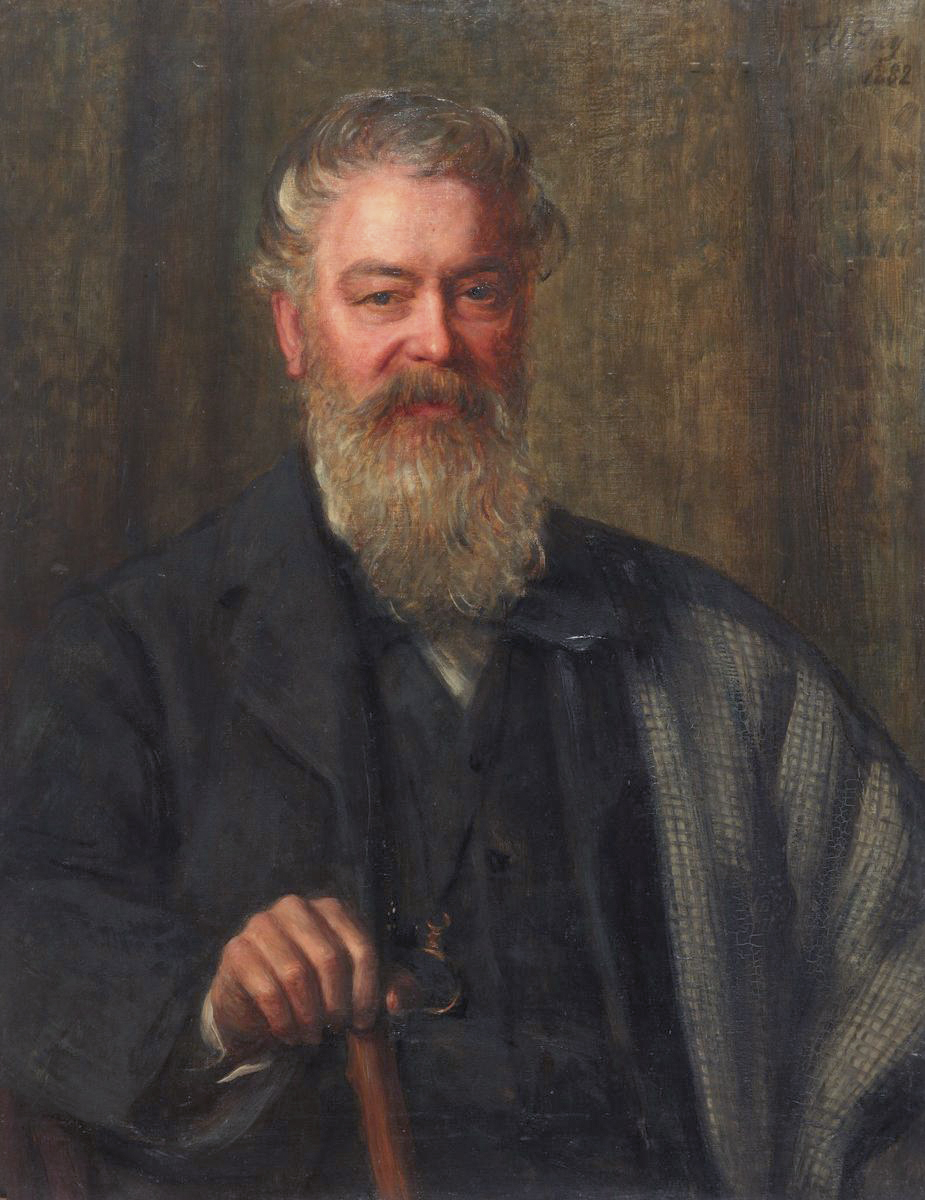
Edwin Waugh (William Percy, 1882)

William Percy (1820–1903) was a portrait artist of Manchester, England.

He was born in Chorlton-on-Medlock in 1820. His love of art began early in his life: his first picture was exhibited at the Manchester Autumn Festival in 1833. In 1836 he went to London to become a pupil and assistant of William Bradley. He returned to Manchester early in 1839 where he established a first class reputation as a portrait painter.

Percy was a founder of the Manchester Academy of Art in 1845. As he wrote later:

First - to institute a class for the study of the antique and the living model - the want of which has been long felt by the students and artists of this town as an insuperable bar to professional advancement. Secondly - to collect a library for reference, comprising history, poetry, archeology, optics, anatomy, chemistry, as applied to colour, architecture, sculpture, painting and engraving.

In 1882, Percy's painting of poet Edwin Waugh was hung at the Manchester Art Gallery.

At an exhibit of 51 of his portraits in 1885, The Manchester Literary Club remarked that, in his water colours of children, Percy was "almost without a rival among living painters."

He died at his home in Ashton-on-Mersey on 18 December 1903.
