= Edwin Waugh =

English poet (1817-1890)

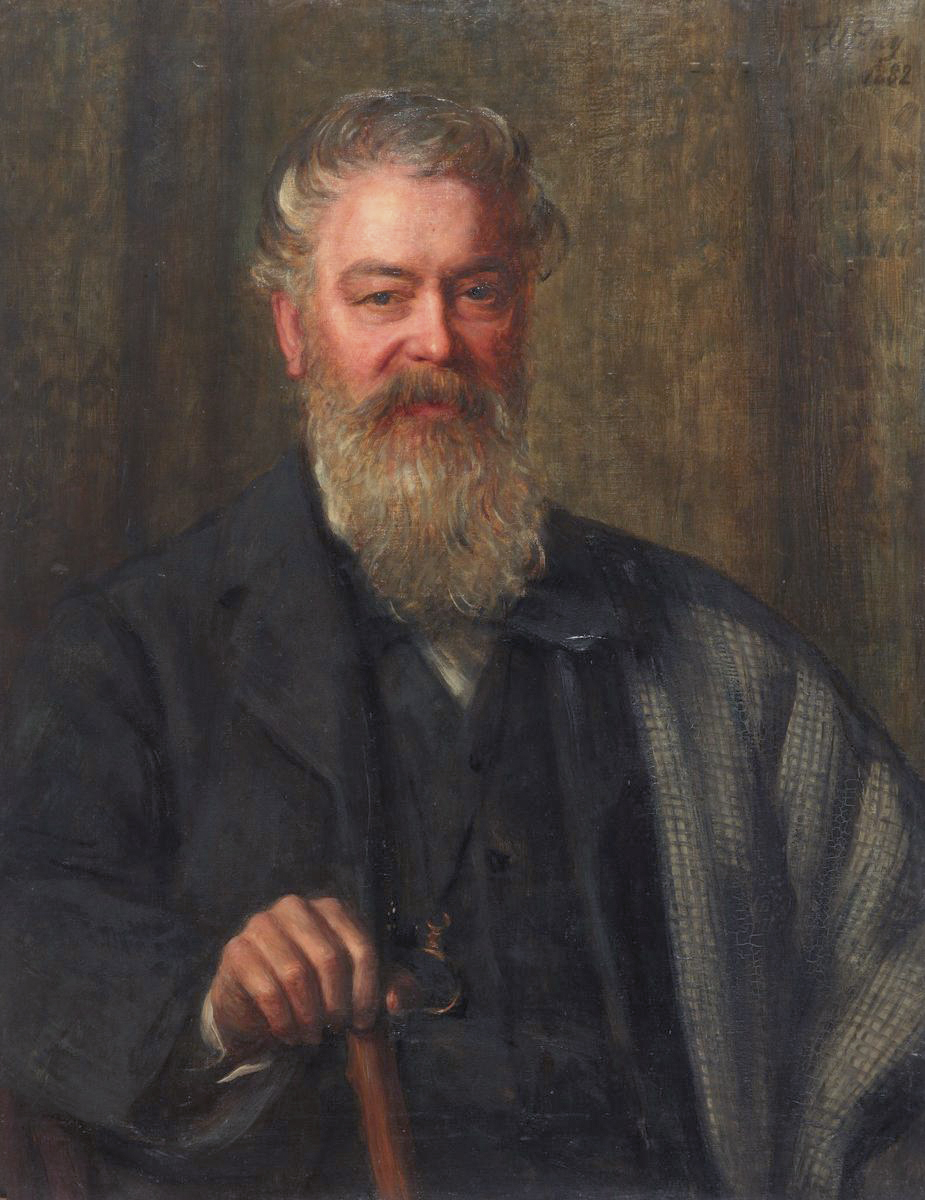
Edwin Waugh (William Percy, 1882)

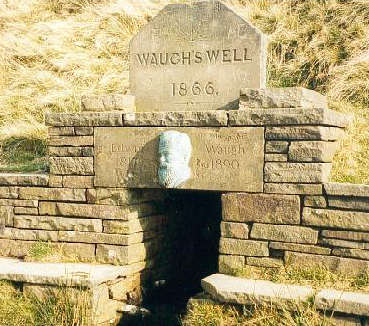
Waugh's Well

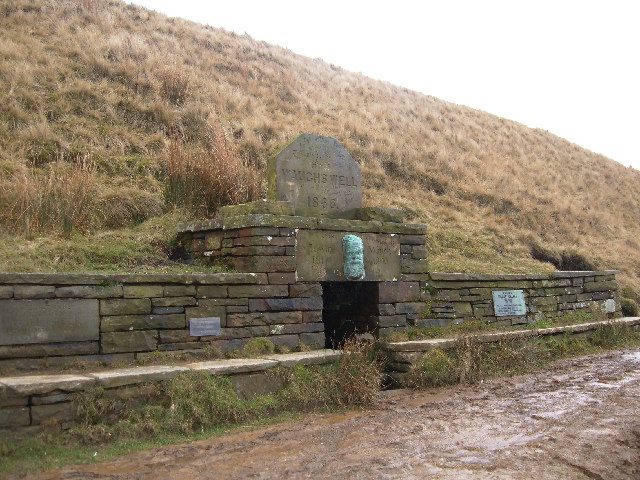
Waugh's Well. This monument was originally built on the site of a spring in 1866 to honour Rochdale-born Edwin Waugh. It was rebuilt in 1966 in memory of Ward Ogden, a local naturalist and rambler. It makes for a fine contemplative viewpoint and resting place on the Rossendale Way.

Edwin Waugh (1817–1890) was an English poet.

== Life ==
The son of a shoemaker, Waugh was born in Rochdale, Lancashire, England and, after some schooling, was apprenticed to a printer, Thomas Holden, at the age of 12. While still a young man he worked as a journeyman printer, travelling all over Britain, but eventually returned to his old job in Rochdale.

Waugh read eagerly, and in 1847 became assistant secretary to the Lancashire Public School Association and went to work in Manchester. In Manchester he started publishing descriptions of rural rambles, and the reception of his works encouraged him to persevere. By 1860 he was able to become a full-time writer; but in 1881 he was in poor health and was granted a Civil List pension of £90 p.a.

== Death and legacy ==
Waugh died at his home in New Brighton, Cheshire, in 1890 and was buried in St Paul's churchyard on Kersal Moor. Waugh's Well was built in 1866 to commemorate him at Foe Edge Farm, on the moors above Edenfield, Rossendale where he spent much time writing. Foe Edge, was demolished by the North West Water Authority in the mid-1970s and no trace remains of the building. There is a monument in Broadfield Park, Rochdale which commemorates Margaret Rebecca Lahee, Oliver Ormerod, John Trafford Clegg and Edwin Waugh.

== Works ==
Waugh first attracted attention with sketches of Lancashire life and character in the Manchester Examiner. His first book Sketches of Lancashire Life and Localities was published in 1855 while he was working as a traveller for a Manchester printing firm. He wrote also prose: Factory Folk, Besom Ben Stories, and The Chimney Corner. His Lancashire dialect songs, collected as Poems and Songs (1859), brought him local fame. He has been called "the Lancashire Burns." His most famous poem is "Come whoam to thi childer an' me", 1856.

== Gallery ==
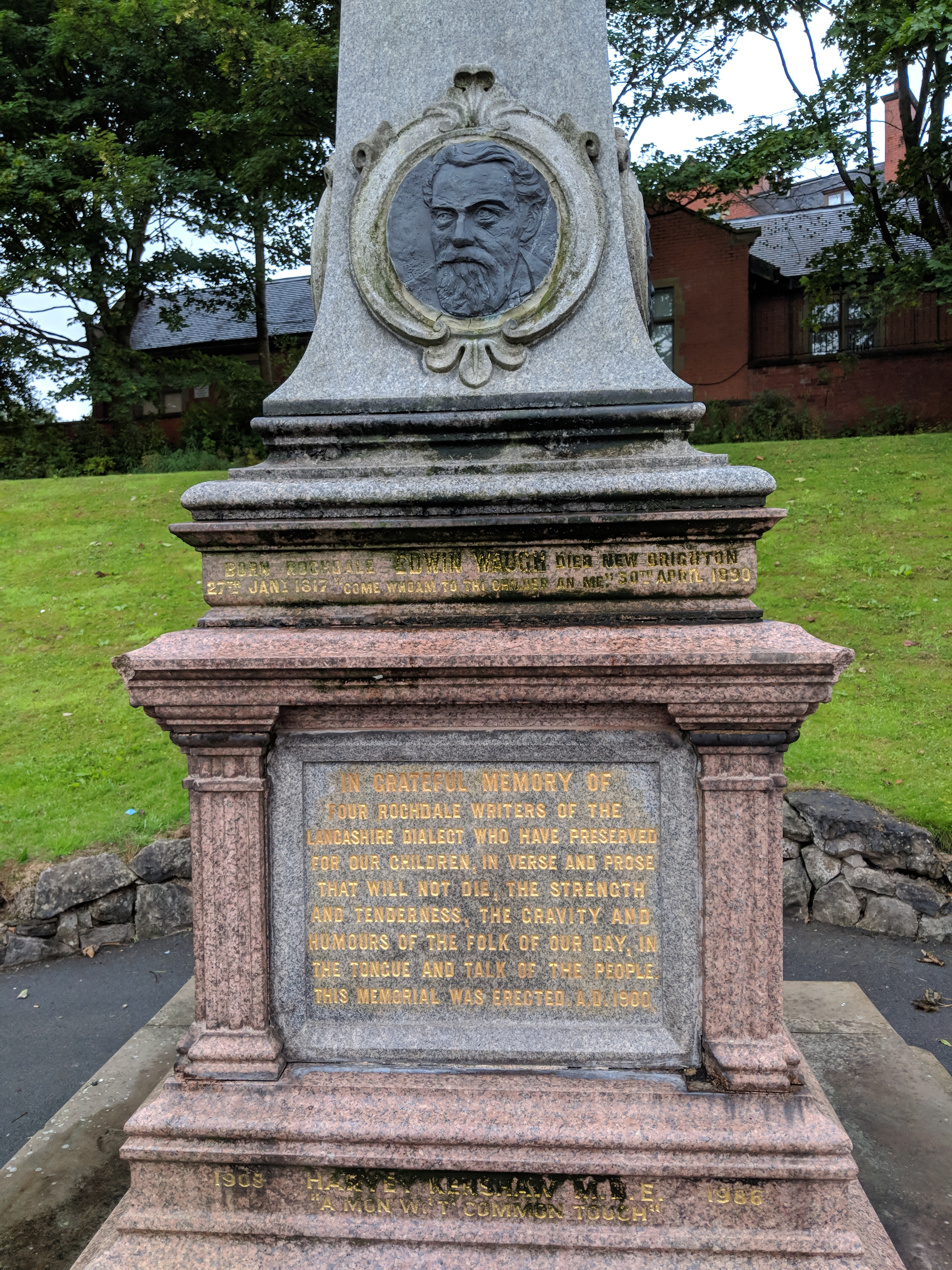
Monument to Edwin Waugh in Rochdale, Lancashire

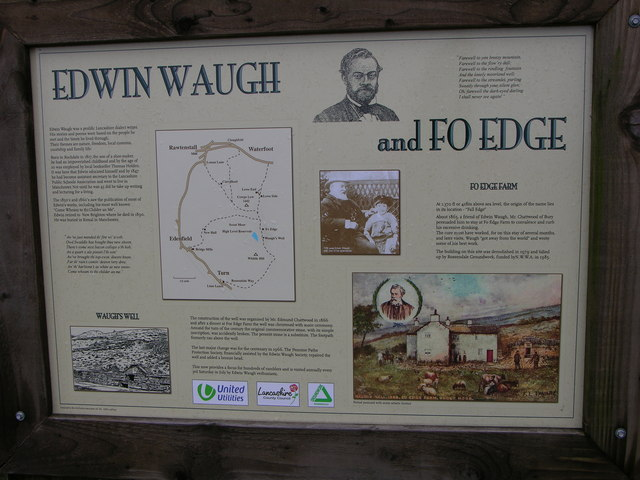
Edwin Waugh stayed at the Fo Ridge farmhouse with his friend Mr Chattwood in 1865 to convalesce and wrote some of his best poetry. Origin of the name is "Fall edge".

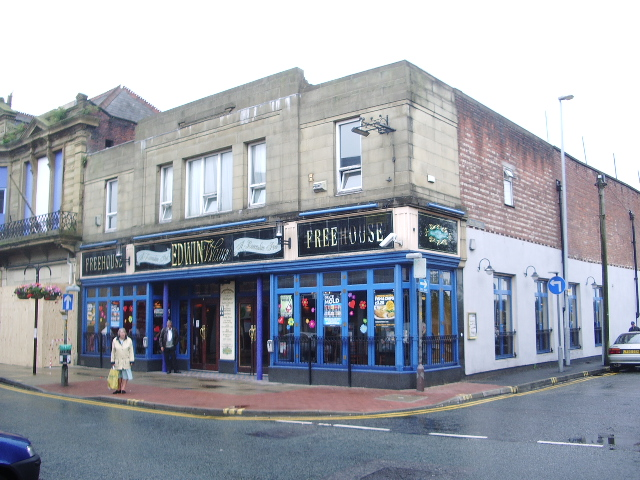
The Edwin Waugh Pub on Bridge Street, Heywood

== See also ==
- John Collier (caricaturist)
