= Border tartan =

Checked fabric associated with the Anglo-Scottish Border country

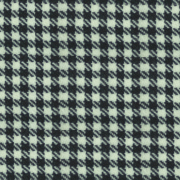
A modern version of the Border tartan

Border tartan, sometimes known as Borders tartan, Northumbrian tartan, Northumberland tartan, shepherds' plaid, shepherds' check, Border drab, or Border check, is a design used in woven fabrics historically associated with the Anglo-Scottish Border, particularly with the Scottish Borders and Northumberland. Possibly the most identifiable Border tartan garment of the region is the maud, made popular from the 1820s by fashionable Border Scots such as Sir Walter Scott, James Hogg, Henry Scott Riddell and Robert Burns.

The modern Border tartan is a crossweave of small dark and light checks, much plainer than the more elaborate Scottish tartans. Traditionally, the yarn for the light squares was simply untreated sheep's wool and the darker yarn was the same wool dyed with simple vegetable dyes, such as alder bark or water flag, or the untreated wool of a black sheep.

James Hogg painted with a Border plaid over his left shoulder

Modern Border Tartans are almost invariably a bold black and white check, but historically the light squares were the yellowish colour of untreated wool, with the dark squares any of a range of dark greys, blues, greens or browns; hence the alternative name of "Border drab". At a distance the checks blend together making the fabric ideal camouflage for stalking game. This style of tartan is one of the oldest in existence as fragments of similar tartans have been found in Great Britain and Jutland.

One similar fragment was discovered in an earthenware pot filled with silver coins, at the Antonine Wall in Falkirk, Scotland. This fragment, known as the Falkirk tartan or Falkirk sett, is currently the earliest check fragment found in the British Isles and dates back to Roman Britain times (around the 3rd century AD). It is actually more a tweed than a tartan in weaving style. It is now kept in the National Museum of Scotland. The Celts were said by Roman scholars to wear bright stripes, which some have suggested are actually descriptions of the brighter variants of tartan. Another similar tartan was found on a cloak in the peat bog at Thorsberg, in the modern-day Schleswig-Holstein region of northern Germany. In Anglo-Saxon England, though check was commonly used, its use in Schleswig is thought to have been greater (even as far as being used for tunics, unlike in England where tunics were usually plain hues, with cloaks and trousers being the most common check garments), suggesting that the continental Germanic peoples of the area used the design to an even greater extent than those in England.

Border tartan is possibly the easiest tartan to create due to its use of natural colours and undyed wool.

From this general check pattern came the houndstooth variant, first developed in Lowland Scotland. This check is now famous for being used as the design for traditional chefs' trousers, in which the pattern helps to hide minor stains.

== Popular culture ==
Walter Scott was famed for wearing trousers of Border tartan, thus starting a fashion for checked clothing in Victorian London.

In Sketches by Boz, a collection of short pieces published by Charles Dickens, the "shepherds' plaid" is mentioned.

The Border tartan has long been worn by the retainers of the House of Percy. In 1760, it was adopted as the official tartan of the Duke of Northumberland's piper. It is also the official plaid for pipers of the Northumberland Fusiliers and is nowadays commonly worn by Northumbrian pipers in general.

The Border tartan inspired the colours of Newcastle United F.C. On 23 May 2025, the club launched a new shirt for the upcoming season which directly embeds the 'Shepherd's Check' into the jersey design.

Sherman McCoy in The Bonfire of the Vanities by Tom Wolfe encounters a man in his building wearing a shepherds' check necktie.
