= Margaret Rebecca Lahee =

Irish popular Lancashire dialect writer

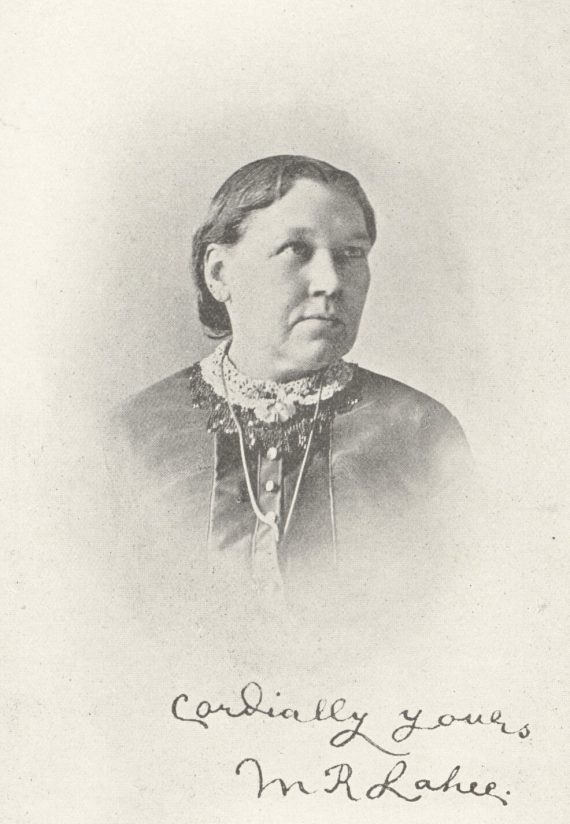
- M.R. Lahee
- Born: Margaret Rebecca Lahee; 10 May 1831; Carlow, Ireland
- Died: 14 June 1895; Rochdale, Lancashire
- Known for: Lancashire dialect writer

Margaret Rebecca Lahee (10 May 1831 – 14 June 1895) was an Irish popular Lancashire dialect writer from the 19th century.

== Early life and education ==
She was born in Carlow, Ireland on 10 May 1831. She moved to Rochdale, Lancashire to learn millinery and dress making from a friend of her relatives. Lahee didn't like the career and instead became a professional writer.

At the time she published, Lahee concealed that she was both Irish and a woman. She published under MRL initially and then later as M.R.Lahee. She also wrote in the female perspective and touched on women's rights. Edwin Waugh said of her first novel that it was the best story in the Lancashire dialect. Lahee lived in Rochdale with Susannah Rothwell Wild for over thirty years. The women were buried in the same grave when they died. Lahee requested their grave should read They were lovely and pleasant in their lives, and in death they were undivided. However, there were difficulties in arranging the burial and the inscription was never erected. It was not clear if the difficulty was because she was Irish, a woman or because assumptions about her sexuality. She was one of the four dialect writers to be included in the monument to Lancashire dialect writers in Rochdale. In part her inclusion was at the successful campaign by Wild. Edward Sykes, a local architect, created the monument and it was completed in 1900. John Cassidy was the artist who created the portraits. The monument commemorates Margaret Rebecca Lahee, Oliver Ormerod, John Trafford Clegg and Edwin Waugh and it is in Broadfield Park, Rochdale.

== Bibliography ==
- The Sporting Party and Owd Neddy Fitton's Visit to the Earl of Derby; a True Lancashire Sketch [in the Lancashire Dialect], 1859
- Tim Bobbin's Adventure with the Irishman; or Raising the Dead by the Art of Freemasonry: A Lancashire Tale, 1860
- Owd Yem Un His Five Daughters, 1861
- The hunting party; or, Owd Jemmy Wrigley's story abeawt th' fust sir Robert Peel, by the author of 'Owd Neddy Fitton's visit to th'earl o'Derby', 1863
- Betty o’ Yep's Laughable Tale of Jinny Cropper at th’ Halton Feast, 1865
- The Carter's Struggles; Showing hoe Jone o’ Jeffrey's Wortched to Bring Up his Family Gradely, 1871
- Esther Brella's Divvy, an’ what hoo did wi’ it, 1871
- Ordering her Coffin, 1876
- Next of Kin. A Humorous Dialogue, 1880
- The Baum Rabbit: A Tale of Old Rochdale, 1880
- Trot Coffie's Boggart: A Lancashire Ghost Story, 1881
- Acquitted Though Guilty, 1883
- Tim Bobbin's Centenary. A Ghostly Conversation in Verse, 1886
- Sybil West. A Lancashire Story, 1892
- The Bewitched Teapots
- How Bob Manock geet to th’ Cheermon o’ th’ Henpeck’d Club. We th’ Rules un Regulations. By a Member
