= Hert (surname) =

Hert or De Hert is a surname. Notable people with the surname include:

- Alvin Tobias Hert (1865–1921), Americal politician
- Andriy Hert (born 1994), Ukrainian footballer
- Robbe De Hert (1942–2020), Belgian film director
- Sallie Aley Hert (1863–1948), Americal politician
- Tami Hert, American singer

== See also ==
- Jiří Heřt (1928–2014), Czech anatomist and researcher
