= Nosek =

Nosek (Czech and Slovak feminine: Nosková) is a West Slavic surname, meaning "small nose". Notable people include:

Nosek

- Brian Nosek (born ?), American social psychologist
- David Nosek (born 1981), Czech ice hockey player
- Jakub Nosek (born 1989), Czech deaf bobsledder
- Luke Nosek (born 1975/1976), American entrepreneur
- Margaret Nosek (1952–2020), American disability rights activist
- Martin Nosek (born 1987), Slovak footballer
- Randy Nosek (born 1967), American baseball player
- Tomáš Nosek (born 1992), Czech ice hockey player
- Václav Nosek (1892–1955), Czech communist politician

Nosková

- Linda Nosková, Czech tennis player
- Michaela Nosková (born 1983), Czech pop singer, recording artist, and musical theater performer
- Nikola Nosková (born 1997), Czech road cyclist and cyclo-cross racer
- Petra Nosková (born 1967), Czech biathlete
- Tereza Nosková (born 1997), Czech luger
- Věra Nosková (born 1947), Czech writer, journalist, and promoter of science and critical thinking

== See also ==
- Noskov / Noskova, Russian surname
