= Noskov =

Noskov (masculine, Russian: Носков) or Noskova (feminine, Russian: Носкова) is a Russian surname originating from the noun nos meaning nose. Nosková is also a feminine Czech surname derived from the masculine form Nosek, with nosek meaning a small nose. Notable people with the surname include:

- Linda Nosková (born 2004), Czech tennis player
- Luiza Noskova (born 1968), Russian biathlete
- Margarita Noskova (born 2002), Russian deaf snowboarder
- Michaela Nosková (born 1983), Czech pop singer, recording artist, and musical theater performer
- Nikola Nosková (born 1997), Czech road cyclist and cyclo-cross racer
- Nikolai Noskov (born 1956), Russian singer
- Petra Nosková (born 1967), Czech biathlete
- Serge Noskov (born 1956), Russian composer
- Tereza Nosková (born 1997), Czech luger
- Věra Nosková (born 1947), Czech writer and journalist
- Yana Noskova (born 1994), Russian table tennis player
- Yekaterina Rozenberg (née Noskova; born 1980), Russian runner
