= Česko hledá SuperStar =

Czech reality television series

- Created by: TV Nova
- Starring: Leoš Mareš; Ondřej Hejma; Ilona Csáková; Eduard Klezla
- Country of origin: Czech Republic
- No. of seasons: 3

Original release
- Network: TV Nova
- Release: 29 February 2004 – 17 December 2006

Česko hledá SuperStar (lit. 'Czechia Seeks the Superstar') is the Czech version of the Idol series which ran from 2004 to 2006. The show was broadcast on Czech TV Nova for three seasons. The first series was exceedingly popular, with the final in June 2004 being watched by 3.3 million people, an 84% viewership share. In 2009, SuperStar (Czech and Slovak TV series), a joint version between Czechia and Slovakia, was launched.

== Series overview ==
Series	Air date	Finalists	Final weeks	Winner	Runner-up	Host(s)	Judging panel
One	29 February - 20 June 2004	10	9	Aneta Langerová	Šárka Vaňková	Ondřej Brzobohatý; Ladislava Něrgešová	Ondřej Hejma; Gábina Osvaldová; Ondřej Soukup; Milan Herman
Two	9 January - 12 June 2005	12	10	Vlastimil Horváth	Petr Bende	Petr Holík; Ladislava Něrgešová	Michal Horáček; Gábina Osvaldová; Ondřej Soukup; Eduard Klezla
Three	27 August - 17 December 2006	10	9	Zbyněk Drda	David Spilka	Leoš Mareš	Ondřej Hejma; Ilona Csáková; Eduard Klezla

== Season 1 (2004) ==
=== Finalists ===
(ages stated at time of contest)

Contestant	Age	Hometown	Voted Off	Liveshow Theme
Aneta Langerová	17	Říčany	Winner	Grand Finale
Šárka Vaňková	16	Jirkov	20 June 2004	Grand Finale
Sámer Issa	18	Děčín	13 June 2004	Contestant's Choice
Tomáš Savka	20	Horní Slavkov	6 June 2004	English/Czech Film Hits
Martina Balogová	25	Ústí nad Labem	30 May 2004	Rock Ballads
Julian Záhorovský	19	Pardubice	23 May 2004	Big Band
Stanislav Dolinek	20	Brno	16 May 2004	60s Hits
Petra Páchová	17	Mladá Boleslav	9 May 2004	Musicals
Petr Poláček	19	Neratovice	2 May 2004	80s Hits
Veronika Zaňková	19	Lično	25 April 2004	My SuperStar

=== Elimination chart ===
Legend
Female	Male	Top 40	Wild Card	Top 10	Winner

Did Not Perform	Safe	Safe First	Safe Last	Eliminated

Stage:		Semi Finals					Finals								
Week:		3/14	3/21	3/28	4/4	4/18	4/25	5/2	5/9	5/16	5/23	5/30	6/6	6/12	6/20
Place	Contestant	Result													
1	Aneta Langerová	1st													Winner
2	Šárka Vaňková				Elim	1st									Runner-up
3	Sámer Issa		1st										Bottom 2	Elim	
4	Tomáš Savka		2nd								Bottom 2	Bottom 2	Elim		
5	Martina Balogová			1st				Bottom 2		Bottom 3	Bottom 3	Elim			
6	Julián Záhorovský			2nd				Bottom 3	Bottom 2	Bottom 2	Elim				
7	Stanislav Dolinek	Elim				Wild Card			Bottom 3	Elim					
8	Petra Páchová				1st		Bottom 3		Elim						
9	Petr Poláček				2nd		Bottom 2	Elim							
10	Veronika Zaňková	2nd					Elim								
Semi- Final 5	Radka Podušková			Elim		Elim									
Semi- Final 5	Madalena Joao				Elim	Elim									
Semi- Final 5	Marta Balážová				Elim	Elim									
Semi- Final 5	Jan Kořalka		Elim			Elim									
Semi- Final 5	Michaela Beierová		Elim			Elim									
Semi- Final 5	Tomáš Poduška				Elim	Elim									
Semi- Final 4	Markéta Egermaierová				Elim										
Semi- Final 4	Tomáš Krzyžanek				Elim										
Semi- Final 4	Dita Halová				Elim										
Semi- Final 4	Veronika Šotová				Elim										
Semi- Final 3	Veronika Ulrichová			Elim											
Semi- Final 3	Jolana Smyčková			Elim											
Semi- Final 3	Zuzana Zaharowská			Elim											
Semi- Final 3	Petra Pudová			Elim											
Semi- Final 3	Irini Charalambidu			Elim											
Semi- Final 3	Zdeněk Matula			Elim											
Semi- Final 3	Vojtěch Hrtan			Elim											
Semi- Final 2	Leona Uričková		Elim												
Semi- Final 2	Petra Štolfová		Elim												
Semi- Final 2	Martin Kubát		Elim												
Semi- Final 2	Inna Proskurňa		Elim												
Semi- Final 2	Lucie Dvořáková		Elim												
Semi- Final 2	Lenka Gotthardová		Elim												
Semi- Final 1	Ivana Husáková	Elim													
Semi- Final 1	Vojtěch Dinga	Elim													
Semi- Final 1	Tomáš Blucha	Elim													
Semi- Final 1	Karolína Huvarová	Elim													
Semi- Final 1	Patrick Jurdić	Elim													
Semi- Final 1	Silvie Lehnerová	Elim													
Semi- Final 1	Kateřina Steinerová	Elim													

The results of the first series were (the vote numbers are for the last night when the contestants were eliminated):

#	Name	Votes (people - %)	Final night	CD title	Release date
1.	Aneta Langerová	2,359,739 - 79.16%	20 June 2004	1. "Spousta andělů" (lit. 'A Lot of Angels'); 2. "Dotyk" (lit. 'Touch'); 3. "Jsem" (lit. 'I Am')	6 September 2004; 21 May 2007; 9 November 2009
2.	Šárka Vaňková	621,235 - 20.84%	20 June 2004	"Věřím náhodám" (lit. 'I Trust Chances')	26 November 2004
3.	Sámer Issa	336,581 - 21.7%	13 June	"Busted"	26 November 2004
4.	Tomáš Savka	203,916 - 14.8%	6 June	"Já si tě stejně najdu" (lit. 'I Will Find You Anyway')	15 November 2004
5.	Martina Balogová	85,774 - 7.9%	30 May	"I Am Not From Here"	18 April 2005
6.	Julian Záhorovský	ca 76,000 - 7.5%	23 May	"Obraz J. Z." (lit. 'Picture of J. Z.')	24 January 2005
7.	Stanislav Dolinek	43,005 - 5.6%	16 May	"Standa 001"	15 November 2004
8.	Petra Páchová	35,613 - 4.3%	9 May	–	
9.	Petr Poláček	31,696 - 5.0%	2 May	"Petr Poláček & Iluze"	7 Mar 2005
10.	Veronika Zaňková	23,418 - 3.0%	25 April	"Zpátky na Zemi" (lit. 'Back On Earth')	1 Oct 2004

The finalists also recorded SuperStar Top 10, an album that includes three songs that they sing together. Two of them are by Top 10, "Veď mě dál" (lit. 'Lead Me On') and Superstar. The Top 5 sing together "Hvězdy" (lit. 'Stars'). Their first single is "Veď mě dál" with 4 versions on the CD single.

== Season 2 (2005) ==
There were twelve finalists instead of the previous ten, with two eliminated on the first evening. They recorded the SuperStar Top 12 album that includes the single "Hvězda snů" (lit. 'Star of Dreams') that has four versions on the CD Single. The winner Vlastimil Horváth's Romani origin, like Martina Balogová in the first series, was widely noted.

=== Finalists ===
(ages stated at time of contest)

Contestant	Age	Hometown	Voted Off	Liveshow Theme
Vlastimil Horváth	27	Vranov u Benešova	Winner	Grand Finale
Petr Bende	27	Újezd u Rosic	12 June 2005	Grand Finale
Gabriela Al Dhábba	19	Prague	5 June 2005	Musicals
Michal Hudček	26	Prague	29 May 2005	Hits of the New Millennium
Ali Amiri	25	Plzeň	22 May 2005	Rock Hits
Michael Foret	18	Prostějov	15 May 2005	Hits from Semafor
Klára Zaňková	16	Lično	8 May 2005	Big Band
Filip Jankovič	19	Trenčín	1 May 2005	Love Songs
Michaela Nosková	22	Brno	24 April 2005	Country Hits
Kristýna Peterková	21	Prague	17 April 2005	70s Hits
Janika Kolářova	17	Brno	10 April 2005	My SuperStar
Monika Šramlová	26	Hostinné	10 April 2005	My SuperStar

=== Elimination chart ===
Legend
Female	Male	Top 40	Wild Card	Top 11	Winner

Did Not Perform	Safe	Safe First	Safe Last	Eliminated

Stage:		Semi Finals					Wild Card	Finals									
Week:		2/27	3/6	3/13	3/20	3/27	4/3	4/10	4/17	4/24	5/1	5/8	5/15	5/22	5/29	6/5	6/12
Place	Contestant	Result															
1	Vlastimil Horváth	1st															Winner
2	Petr Bende				2nd								Bottom 2	Bottom 2			Runner-up
3	Gabriela Al Dhábba		2nd						Bottom 3	Bottom 3	Bottom 2	Bottom 2			Bottom 2	Elim	
4	Michal Hudček	2nd													Elim		
5	Ali Amiri			1st									Bottom 3	Elim			
6	Michael Foret					Elim	Wild Card					Bottom 3	Elim				
7	Klára Zaňková				1st						Bottom 3	Elim					
8	Filip Jankovič					1st				Bottom 2	Elim						
9	Michaela Nosková		1st					Bottom 3	Bottom 2	Elim							
10	Kristýna Peterková					Elim	Wild Card		Elim								
11	Janika Kolářová					2nd		Elim									
12	Monika Šramlová			2nd				Elim									
Semi- Final 5	Simona Bernardová					Elim											
Semi- Final 5	Kamil Řezníček					Elim											
Semi- Final 5	Zuzana Schubertová					Elim											
Semi- Final 5	Aneta Šmidrkalová					Elim											
Semi- Final 5	Naděžda Válová					Elim											
Semi- Final 5	Martin Müller					Elim											
Semi- Final 4	Daniela Kubečková				Elim												
Semi- Final 4	Sandra Ferková				Elim												
Semi- Final 4	Josef Živčák				Elim												
Semi- Final 4	Matouš Kubáček				Elim												
Semi- Final 4	Barbora Zajptová				Elim												
Semi- Final 4	Světlana Šáchová				Elim												
Semi- Final 4	Adam Vojtěch				Elim												
Semi- Final 4	Magdalena Šalamounová				Elim												
Semi- Final 3	Markéta Poulíčková			Elim													
Semi- Final 3	Adam Valášek			Elim													
Semi- Final 3	Rudolf Gabriš			Elim													
Semi- Final 3	Lukáš Bajt			Elim													
Semi- Final 3	Markéta Vítková			Elim													
Semi- Final 3	Tereza Ženatá			Elim													
Semi- Final 3	Eva Kašparová			Elim													
Semi- Final 3	Vojtěch Dinga			Elim													
Semi- Final 2	Michał Rzeszut		Elim														
Semi- Final 2	Michaela Hanusová		Elim														
Semi- Final 2	Adéla Aichingrová		Elim														
Semi- Final 2	Natalie Havrdová		Elim														
Semi- Final 2	Tomáš Löbl		Elim														
Semi- Final 2	Jan Hönig		Elim														
Semi- Final 2	Nikoleta Spalasová		Elim														
Semi- Final 2	Lukáš Michna		Elim														
Semi- Final 1	Lucie Bakešová	Elim															
Semi- Final 1	Andrea Janczarová	Elim															
Semi- Final 1	Leona Černá	Elim															
Semi- Final 1	Tereza Terčová	Elim															
Semi- Final 1	Thomas Glock	Elim															
Semi- Final 1	Michaela Talašová	Elim															
Semi- Final 1	Monika Havlíčková	Elim															
Semi- Final 1	Lukáš Janota	Elim															

== Season 3 (2006) ==
The third season premiered on 27 August 2006, with the finals (back to ten in number) starting on Sunday, 22 October. The voting always took place for a whole day until the results announcement on Monday evening.

=== Finalists ===
(ages stated at time of contest)

Contestant	Age	Hometown	Voted Off	Liveshow Theme
Zbyněk Drda	19	Karlovy Vary	Winner	Grand Finale
David Spilka	20	Olomouc	17 December 2006	Grand Finale
Leona Černá	25	Jiřetín	11 December 2006
Barbora Zemanová	16	Svojšín	4 December 2006
Martin Ševčík	17	Kozlovice	27 November 2006
Soňa Pavelková	15	Zlín	20 November 2006	Abba vs. The Beatles
Roman Lasota	19	Český Těšín	13 November 2006	Musicals
Tereza Najdekrová	20	Prague	6 November 2006
Aleš Burket	19	Chomutov	30 October 2006	Rock Ballads
Karolína Pavlíková	18	Polička	23 October 2006	Hits of the 21st Century

=== Elimination chart ===
Legend
Female	Male	Top 20	Top 10	Winner

Safe	Safe First	Safe Last	Eliminated

Stage:		Semi Finals			Finals								
Week:		10/2	10/9	10/16	10/23	10/30	11/6	11/13	11/20	11/27	12/4	12/11	12/17
Place	Contestant	Result											
1	Zbyněk Drda												Winner
2	David Spilka												Runner-up
3	Leona Černá									Bottom 2	Bottom 2	Elim	
4	Barbora Zemanová								Bottom 3	Bottom 3	Elim		
5	Martin Ševčík							Bottom 3	Bottom 2	Elim			
6	Soňa Pavelková						Bottom 3	Bottom 2	Elim				
7	Roman Lasota				Bottom 2	Bottom 3	Bottom 2	Elim					
8	Tereza Najdekrová					Bottom 2	Elim						
9	Aleš Burket				Bottom 3	Elim							
10	Karolína Pavlíková				Elim								
11-12	Jaroslav Parči			Elim									
11-12	Petra Hlávková			Elim									
13-16	Robert Daniel		Elim										
13-16	Eva Krutáková		Elim										
13-16	Jan Kříž		Elim										
13-16	Eliška Faicová		Elim										
17-20	Michal Michajlec	Elim											
17-20	Zuzana Vlčeková	Elim											
17-20	Jan Kopečný	Elim											
17-20	Barbora Opplová	Elim											

== Starship Troopers General ==
In each season, the worst contestant as voted by the audience would receive the title of "generál Hvězdné pěchoty" ("lit. 'Starship Troopers General'). These were Anna Gleisnerová in 2004 (singing "Thank You" by Dido), Štěpán Turek in 2005 (singing an original song, "Velká diskotéková stávka") and Štěpán Fadrný in 2006 (singing "Sonne" by Rammstein).
