= AKTIP (therapeutic institute) =

Defunct Czech psychosomatic care institute

AKTIP - The Consultation and Therapeutic Institute Prague
- Company type: Public business company
- Industry: Health care
- Founded: 2002; 24 years ago
- Defunct: 2019; 7 years ago
- Headquarters: Prague, Czech Republic
- Key people: Jarmila Klímová (Chairman)
- Services: medicine; Psychosomatic care; Psychotherapy; Psychodiagnostics; Coaching; Energy harmonization; Controlled detoxification of the organism; Kinesiology

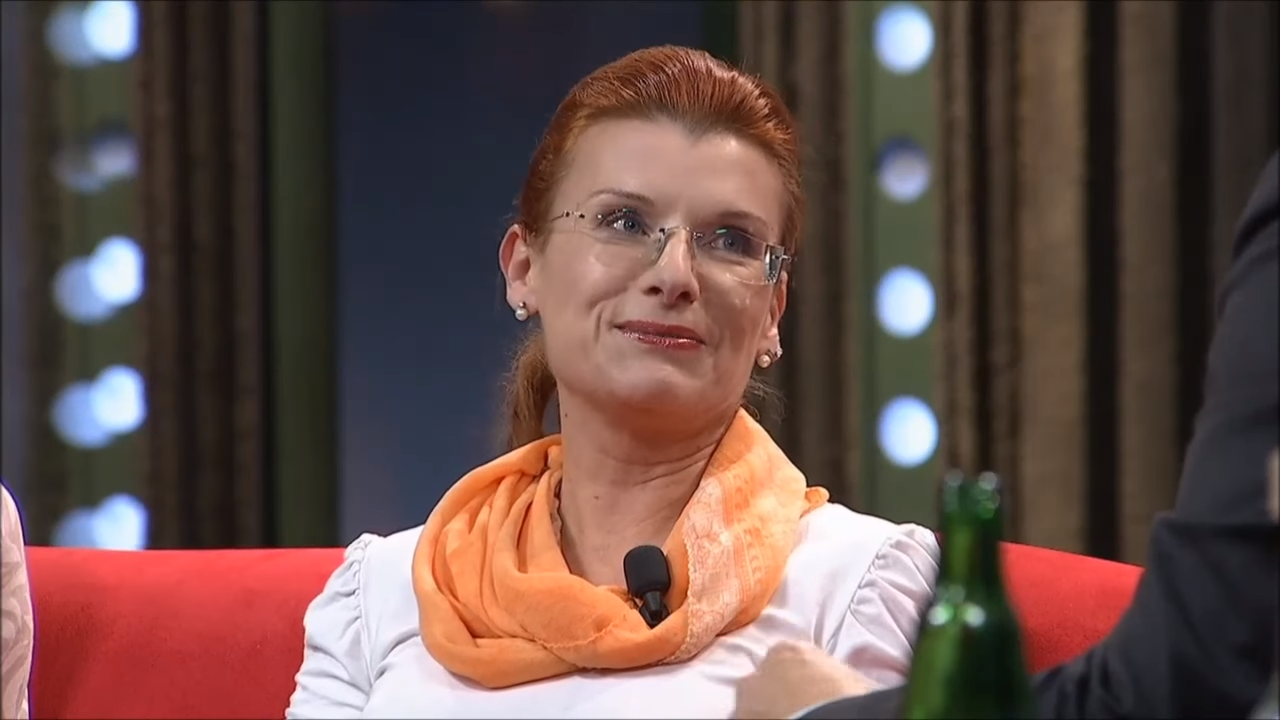
Jarmila Klímová in 2014

AKTIP – Konzultační a terapeutický institut Praha (lit. 'Consultation and Therapeutic Institute Prague') was a private institute in Prague run by the public business company Progressive consulting, offering services in the field of psychosomatic care. The head of the institute was Czech psychiatrist Jarmila Klímová.

Controversy about the methods of the institute emerged when the documentary Infiltrace: Obchod se zdravím (Infiltration: Health Business) was broadcast by Czech television on May 21, 2018. The documentary revealed that the company uses unethical techniques to the detriment of its patients for its financial gain, including pseudoscience, manipulation, and incitement of fear of cancer and anxiety. AKTIP offers examinations and healing by instrumentation and homeopathic preparations of doubtful effectiveness for various somatic diseases, including thyroid disease. Although it has physicians on staff, this institution is not a legitimate provider of health services. It is not a medical facility.

== Erratic Boulder award in the category of teams 2016 ==
AKTIP is the holder of the Silver Erratic Boulder award in the category of teams for 2016. "An eventual client meets here imaginary care in a wide range of disciplines. His complex problems will be treated by a graphologist, an expert in oriental diagnostics and bioresonance therapy will also supply its part of information. If it fails, a miraculous ANESA device, known as the non-invasive AMP blood analyzer (Golden Erratic Boulder award for 2011), will come to the scene", said Sisyfos.

In the awards report its representatives also cite the statement of the head of AKTIP Jarmila Klímová that the human body is set for 400 years of life. "If we really lived only by biological hours, we could be at rest between 380 and 460 years, because this age is set up for our body ... And why do we live only 60 or 80 years? No, because the most important influence outside of ourselves, which fundamentally affects the length and quality of life, we do not accept."

== Professional public response ==
The practices of AKTIP was already criticized by the Czech Oncological Society in 2014. Procedures used by AKTIP employees have been critically evaluated by doctors (f.ex. by cardiologist Věra Adámková) The psychologist Petr Weiss described AKTIP's practices as charlatan fabrications, fraud, and money-pulling activities.

According to the President of the Czech Medical Chamber Milan Kubka, AKTIP's position in the future could be solved by a law on healers that would force "all such charlatan institutions" to mandatory registration. "This institution only looks like a medical facility, and that's a scam from my point of view."

Sisyfos, in response to the AKTIP case, has published an article analyzing the principles of some devices used by individual "consultants" of AKTIP. This article also expresses concern that AKTIP is not an exceptional case, but that it is a fairly common phenomenon among institutions that provide services of alternative medicine.

== End of activities ==
On May 8, 2019, AKTIP announced end of their activities.

== Links ==
=== External links ===
- Infiltration: Business with health documentary (in Czech), Czech Television, 21. 5. 2018
- AKTIP - The Consultation and Therapeutic Institute Prague (in Czech) Official webpage
