= Hert =

Hert or HERT may refer to:

- Headquarters Emergency Relocation Team
- Tami Hert, an R&B singer
- Hert (grape), a synonym of the Gros Verdot red French wine grape variety
- Hertfordshire Essex Rapid Transit (HERT), a proposed public transport system in South East England

== See also ==
- Herts, an abbreviation for Hertfordshire
- Hertsi, a shopping centre in Herttoniemi, Helsinki, Finland
- Hertz
