= Ivan M. Havel =

Czech scientist and philosopher (1938–2021)

Ivan Miloš Havel
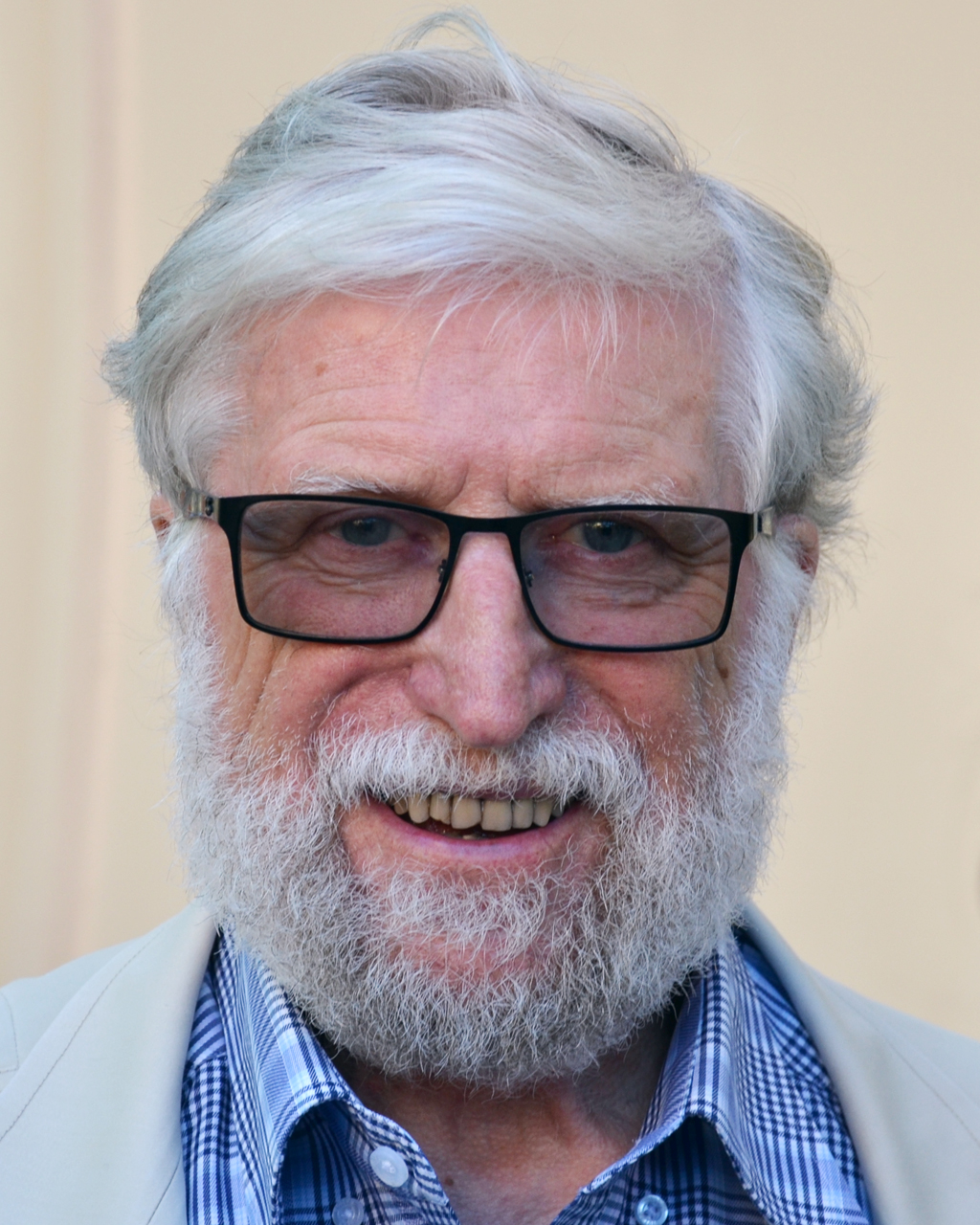
- Born: 11 October 1938; Prague, Czechoslovakia
- Died: 25 April 2021 (aged 82); Košík, Czech Republic
- Citizenship: Czech
- Education: Charles University, University of California, Berkeley, Czech Technical University in Prague
- Occupations: Scientist, Philosopher
- Scientific career
- Fields: Computer science
- Thesis: Strict deterministic languages (1971)

Ivan Miloš Havel (11 October 1938 – 25 April 2021) was a Czech scientist and philosopher. He was the brother of President Václav Havel, with whom he was one of the founders of the Civic Forum.

In years 1990–2019, he was the editor-in-chief of Vesmír.

In a joint award for 2019/2020 commemorating the 30th Anniversary of the fall of Communism, Havel was awarded the Hanno R. Ellenbogen Citizenship Award with Ivan Chvatik (19th) and Hans-Dietrich Genscher and Markus Meckel (20th) by the Prague Society and Global Panel Foundation.
