= Jiří Grygar =

Czech astrophysicist and astronomer (born 1936)

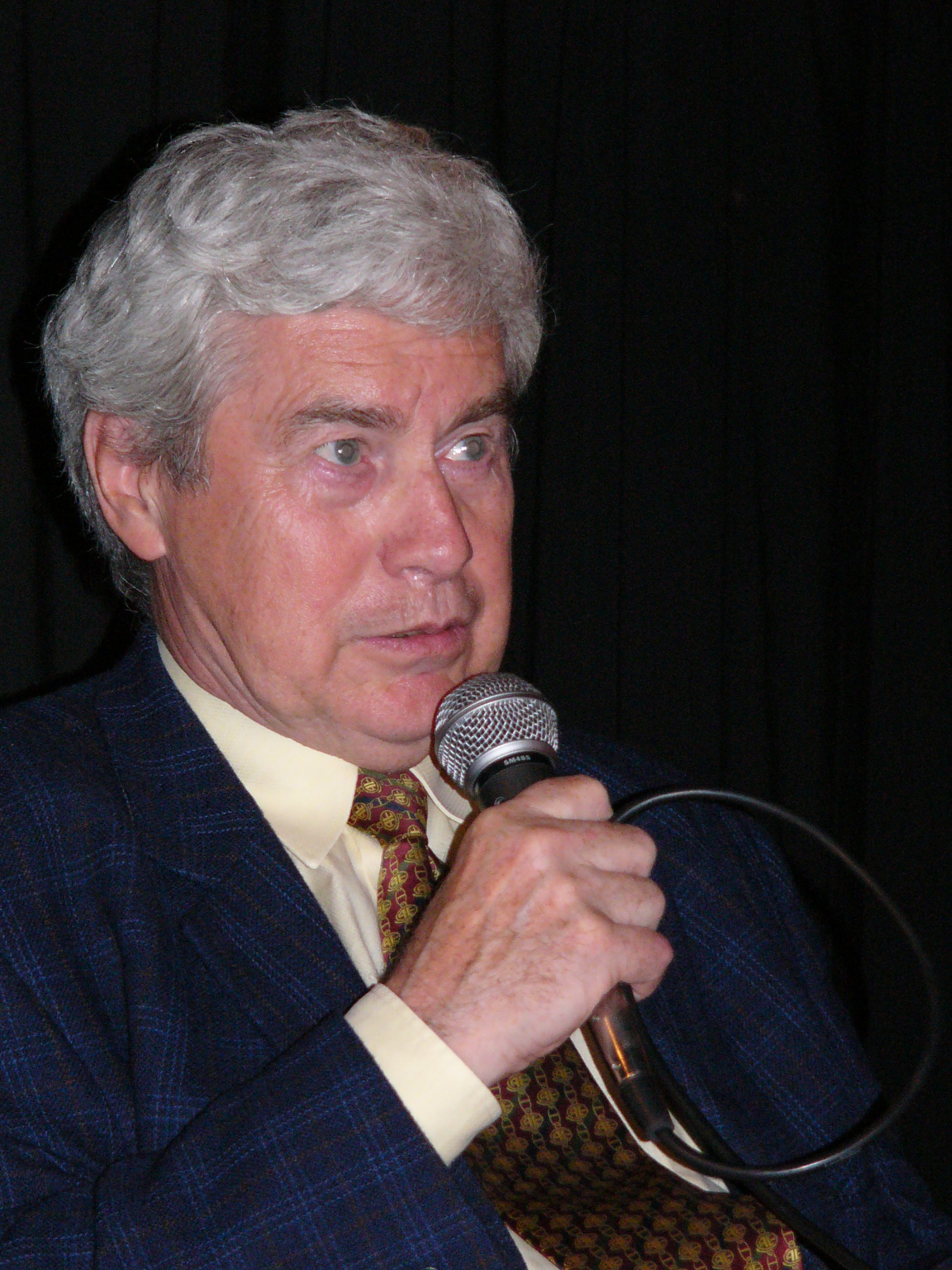
Jiří Grygar (2006)

Jiří Grygar (Czech: [ˈjɪr̝iː ˈɡrɪɡar]; born 17 March 1936 in Heinersdorf, Germany, now Dziewiętlice, Poland) is a Czech astronomer, popularizer of science and Kalinga Prize (1996) laureate.

== Career ==
After studying physics at the Masaryk University in Brno and astronomy at the Charles University in Prague he joined the Astronomical Institute of the Academy of Sciences, Department of Stellar Astronomy in Ondřejov. Twenty years later he moved to the Institute of Physics, Low Temperature Physics Department at Řež, where he remained for more than ten years. Shortly after the Velvet Revolution he joined the High Energy Physics Department at the same institution. From 1992 to 1998, Grygar chaired the Czech Astronomical Society. He also chaired the Czech Television Council and the Science and Philosophy section of the European Culture Club. He is member of editorial boards of the periodicals Říše hvězd, Vesmír, Universum and Omega.

Grygar holds a PhD in astrophysics. His papers focus on interplanetary matter (meteors, comets), limb darkening in stellar atmospheres, close binaries, novae, chemically peculiar stars and remote sensing.

Between 2004 and 2008, Grygar was the president of the Learned Society of the Czech Republic, an association of leading scholars in the country.

== Public appearances ==
Grygar is well known to the public in the Czech Republic and Slovakia due to his TV series about the Universe – Okna vesmíru dokořán ("Wide open windows of the Universe"; 1982–1990). As a member of the Český klub skeptiků Sisyfos scientific skeptic group, he is also a prominent critic of pseudoscience and other unproven theories. A practising Catholic, he is also a well-known writer on the topic of the relationship between religion and science.

== Honors ==
On 26 October 1976 a main-belt asteroid 3336 was discovered by a Czech astronomer Luboš Kohoutek, who named it after Dr. Grygar.

In 2009, Dr. Grygar was awarded one of the most prestigious Czech scientific awards, Česká hlava.

In 2010, he was the inaugural recipient of the respectable Mensa Czech Republic Award.

Grygar is a recipient of a number of other awards.
