= Jiří Heřt =

Czech anatomist, doctor and educator (1928–2014)

Prof. MUDr. Jiří Heřt DrSc.
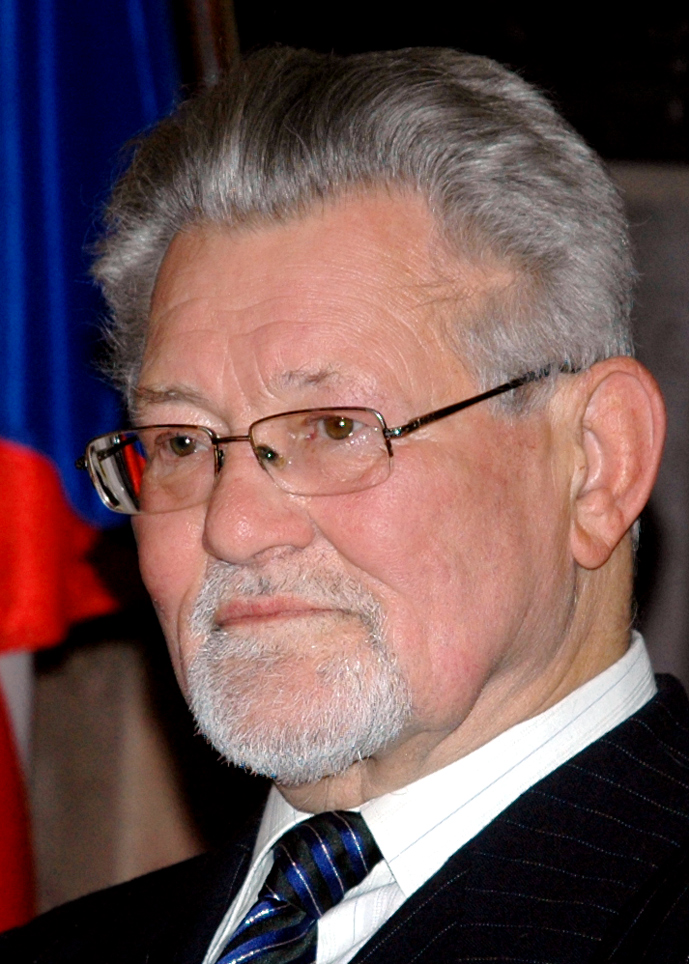
- Jiří Heřt in 2013
- Born: 5 April 1928; Louny, Czechoslovakia
- Died: 9 August 2014 (aged 86); Chomutov, Czech Republic
- Education: Faculty of General Medicine of Charles University in Prague
- Occupations: research scientist, skeptic
- Employer(s): Faculty of Medicine in Plzeň, Charles University
- Organization(s): Czech Skeptics Club Sisyfos (chairman), Association of Medical Doctors in Chomutov (chairman)
- Notable work: Fundamentals of Clinical Anatomy of the Musculoskeletal System (2004), Interpretive Dictionary of Esotericism and Pseudociences (2008)
- Awards: Knight of the Czech Medical Rank (Eques ordinis medicorum bohemicorum), 2012

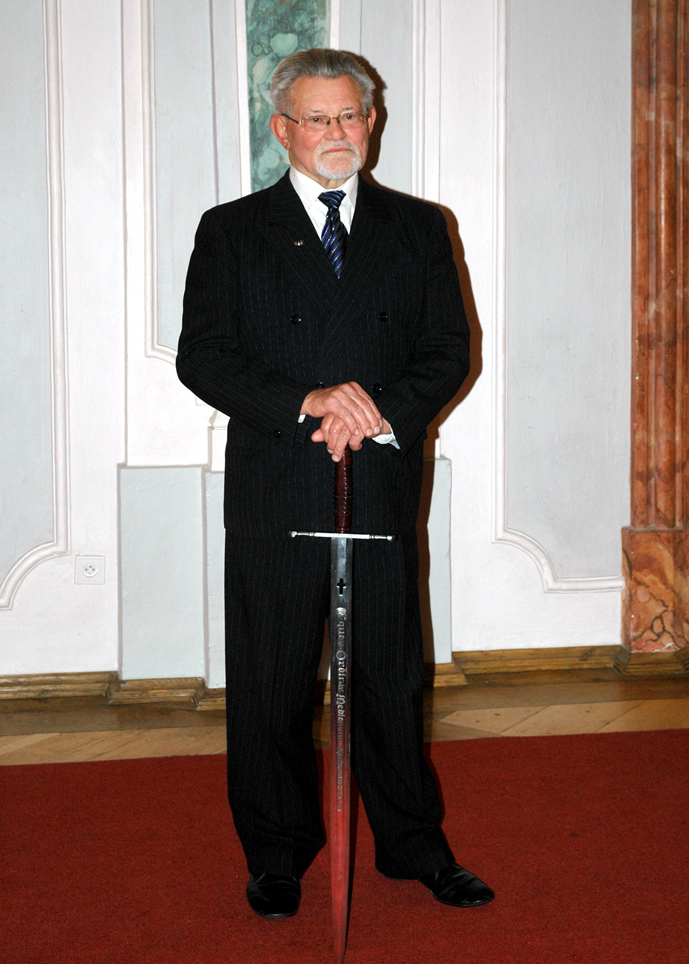
Jiří Heřt, 20th Knight of the Czech Medical Rank (2012)

Jiří Heřt (5 April 1928 – 9 August 2014) was a Czech anatomist and researcher. He was professor of anatomy and the second chairman of the Czech Skeptics Club Sisyfos.

== Life ==
Heřt was born on 5 April 1928 in Louny, Czechoslovakia. After graduating from high school in Louny, he studied medicine at the Faculty of General Medicine of Charles University in Prague and assisted at the Institute of Anatomy under Professor Ladislav Borovanský. On his recommendation, he joined Professor Jaroslav Kos at the Institute of Anatomy of the Faculty of Medicine of Charles University in Plzeň after graduation. There, as a member of the research team, he first dealt with general questions of bone growth and its vascular supply, and later also with the adaptation of bones to functional stress. In 1960, he defended his candidate's thesis and three years later his habilitation thesis on the regulation of the growth of long bones to length. The results of this research had a direct impact on clinical practice and became part of Tosovsky and Stryhal's monograph Children's Fractures, published in 1967.

He established close cooperation with colleagues at the Plzeň Orthopaedic Clinic and by the end of the 1960s had published more than 70 scientific articles in the field of anatomy. Professor Kos' team at the Plzeň Medical School published the textbooks Overview of Topographic Anatomy (1964) and Topographic Anatomy for Dentists (1971), issued again in 1990.

At the end of the 1960s he spent a working stay in Algeria and after his return home he became actively involved in political life as a founding member of the Club of Committed Non-Party Members. After the Warsaw Pact invasion of Czechoslovakia in 1968, KAN was immediately banned and Jiří Heřt was expelled from the Faculty of Medicine. Some of his colleagues chose to emigrate and the entire research team has crumbled. From 1973 until 1990 he worked as a regular medical doctor at the Tube Rolling and Ironworks in Chomutov. Under his direction, a large epidemiological study was conducted, Survey of Coronary Heart Disease and its Risk Factors in the Chomutov Ironworks (1977 and 1984).

He returned to anatomy after the fall of the communist regime in 1989 and in 1990 he lectured at the Orthopaedic Congress in Prague. He declined the offer to lead the Plzeň Anatomical Institute after Kos, but continued his scientific career and defended his doctoral thesis in 1993, thirty years after his habilitation. In the autumn of the same year he was appointed professor. He summarized the results of his long-term osteological research in the publication Basics of Clinical Anatomy of the Musculoskeletal System (with co-author J. Bartoníček, 2004).

He also made his mark on the wider public by his critical stance against so-called alternative medicine, non-scientific theories and quack practices associated with healing. He first encountered the work of healers as a factory doctor in Chomutov and from 1985 began to deal with the issue of alternative medicine on a regular basis. He was one of the founding members of the Czech Skeptics Club Sisyfos and its second chairman. He compiled the first Czech explanatory dictionary of esotericism and pseudoscience. He also became the editor of the collections Science versus Irrationality I–V, containing the texts of lectures given by the Sisyfos Club in 1998–2012 at the Czech Academy of Sciences. As a proponent of the scientific approach within the framework of lege artis, he lectured on the subject of Risks and Possibilities of Alternative Medicine.

He developed a deeper knowledge of developmental biology, which he used to criticize pseudoscientific creationism. He has written and lectured proficiently on the history of skepticism, on open questions about the relationship between science and religion, and surprisingly, he has criticized the approach of the philosopher of science K. R. Popper or the serious shortcomings of the journal Vesmír (Universe), which, in his opinion, has lost its scientific character.

He was the chairman of the Association of Medical Doctors in Chomutov for many years. In March 2013, the Czech Medical Chamber awarded him the Knight of the Czech Medical Rank award for 2012.

He died on 9 August 2014 in Chomutov.

=== Awards ===
- 1993: Commemorative Medal of the Anatomical Society of the Czech Medical Association JEP
- 2005: Silver Medal of Charles University for Merit in Anatomy
- 2008: Jesenius Plaque of the Czech Anatomical Society
- 2010: Gold Medal of Charles University
- 2012: Knight of the Czech Medical Rank (Eques ordinis medicorum bohemicorum)

== Jiří Heřt Award ==
The Czech Sisyphus Skeptics Club has decided to establish its prize to honour the memory of its leading member Prof. MUDr. Jiří Heřt, DrSc. (1928–2014) with an annual award bearing his name. The award can be given to individuals or to teams, organizations and other entities operating in the Czech Republic. The intention of the award is to highlight the laureates' contributions to the use, dissemination and popularization of methods of critical scientific thinking.

=== Laureates ===
- 2021 Creators of Czech Television's Hyde Park Civilization: Gabriela Cihlářová (dramaturg and editor), Pavlína Sedlářová (editor and researcher), Martina Azabi (producer), Jaroslav Zoula (editor), Daniel Stach (presenter and editor).

== Bibliography ==
- Jiří Heřt, Interpretive Dictionary of Esotericism and the Sciences, 2008, 264 p., Nakl. Věra Nosková, Prague, Finidr Č. Těšín, ISBN 978-8090332065
- Jiří Heřt, Alternative medicine and healing, 2011, 240 p., Publisher. Věra Nosková, Prague, printed by TP, Č. Těšín, ISBN 978-8087373156
- Fundamentals of Clinical Anatomy of the Musculoskeletal System, 2004, Bartoníček J, Heřt J, 256 p., Nakl. Maxdorf, Prague, ISBN 8073450178
- Acupuncture, myths and reality, Heřt J et al., 2002, 191 p., Nakl. Galén, ISBN 807262167X
- Jiří Heřt, Homeopathy, Cluster Medicine, Anthroposophical Medicine, 1997, 392 p., Lidové noviny, Prague, ISBN 8071062308
- Alternative medicine – possibilities and risks, Heřt J et al., 1995, Grada, Avicenum, Prague
- Functional adaptation of bone, Heřt J, 1993, SN, Chomutov, Plzeň
- Overview of topographic anatomy, Kos J, Heřt J, Hladíková J, 1981, SPN, Prague
- Topographic anatomy for dentists, Heřt J, 1971, Charles University, Faculty of Medicine in Plzeň, SPN
- Regulation of long bone growth to length: experimental studies on the importance of mechanical factors, Heřt J, 1964, 213 p., SPN / Plzeňský lék. Proceedings, Supplementum 13, Prague
- Jiří Heřt, Jan Hnízdil and Pavel Klener: Akupunktura – mýty a realita / Acupuncture – myths and reality, Galén, Prague 2002, ISBN 807262167X
