= Hroznětín =

- Town
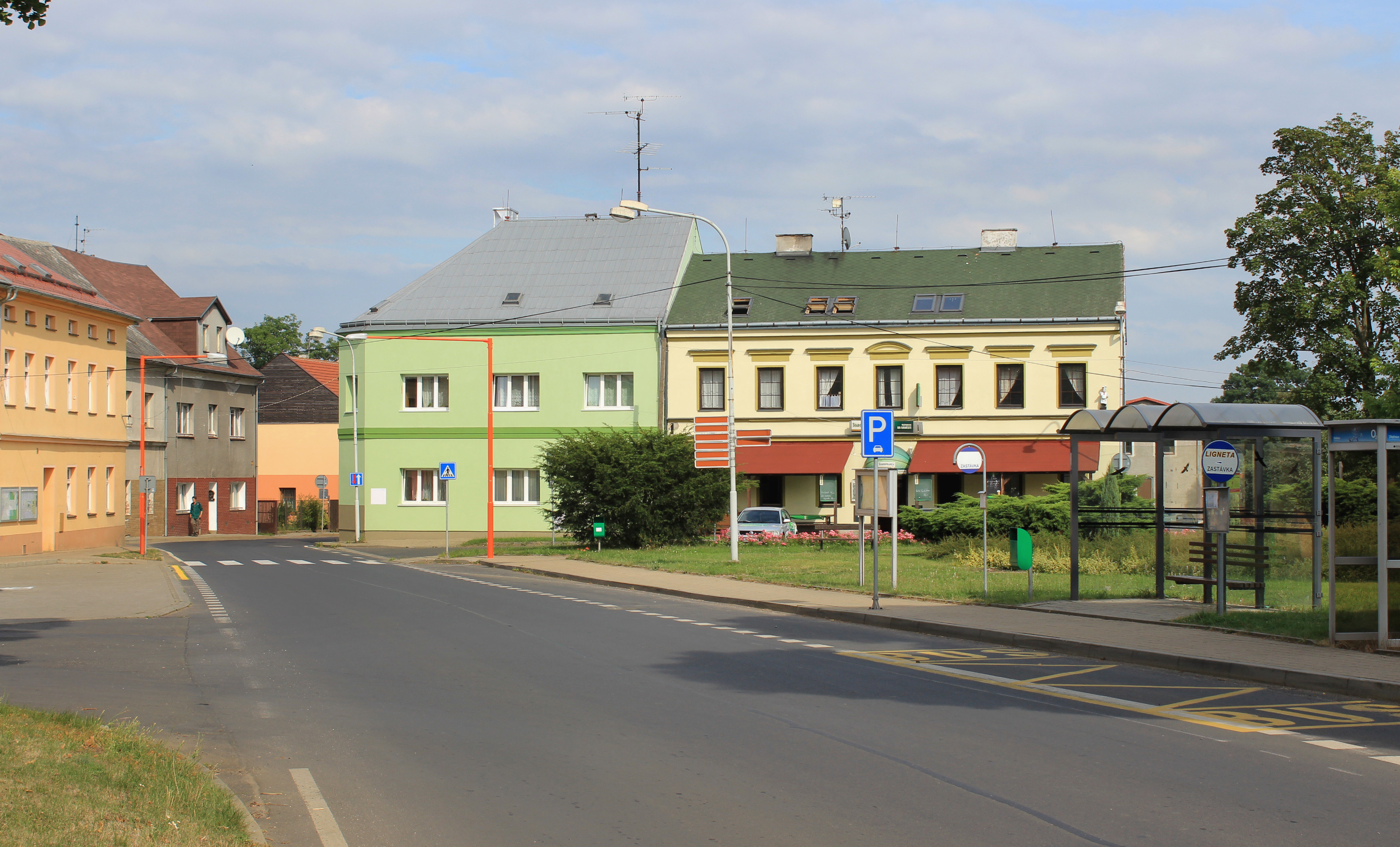
- Town square

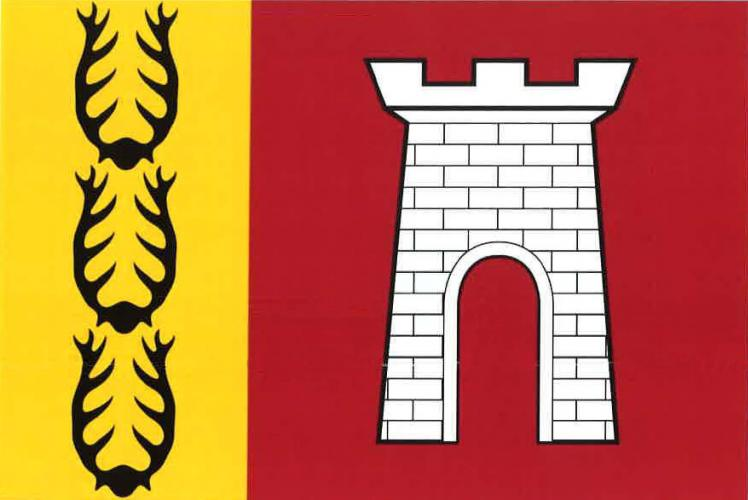
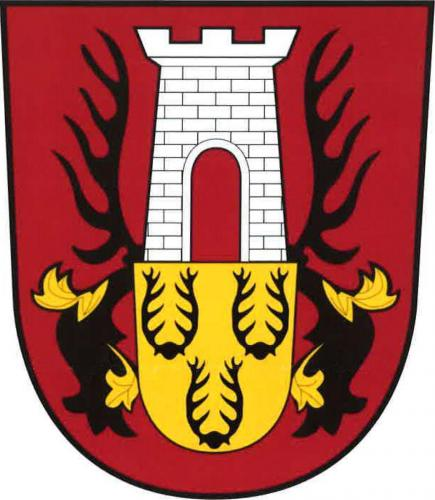
- Flag Coat of arms

- Location in the Czech Republic
- Coordinates: 50°18′41″N 12°52′7″E
- Country: Czech Republic
- Region: Karlovy Vary
- District: Karlovy Vary
- First mentioned: 1213

Government
  - Mayor: Martin Maleček

Area
  - Total: 23.79 km^{2} (9.19 sq mi)
- Elevation: 449 m (1,473 ft)

Population (2026-01-01)
  - Total: 2,179
  - Density: 91.59/km^{2} (237.2/sq mi)
- Time zone: UTC+1 (CET)
  - Summer (DST): UTC+2 (CEST)
- Postal codes: 362 33, 363 01
- Website: mestohroznetin.cz

Hroznětín (Czech pronunciation: [ˈɦrozɲɛciːn]; German: Lichtenstadt) is a town in Karlovy Vary District in the Karlovy Vary Region of the Czech Republic. It has about 2,200 inhabitants. The town is located on the Bystřice River, on the border between the Sokolov Basin and Ore Mountains.

Hroznětín was founded in 1213 or shortly before. The main landmark of the town is the Church of Saints Peter and Paul.

== Administrative division ==
Hroznětín consists of five municipal parts (in brackets population according to the 2021 census):

- Hroznětín (1,439)
- Bystřice (95)
- Odeř (87)
- Ruprechtov (43)
- Velký Rybník (351)

== Etymology ==
Hroznětín was named after Hroznata of Ovenec, who was its first owner.

== Geography ==
Hroznětín is located about 8 kilometres (5 mi) north of Karlovy Vary. Most of the municipal territory lies in the Sokolov Basin, but it also extends to the Ore Mountains in the north. The highest point is at 812 m (2,664 ft) above sea level. The Bystřice River flows through the town.

The southern part of the territory is rich in fishponds, the largest of which is Velký rybník with an area of about 50 ha (120 acres). It is used for fishing and recreational purposes. There are also flooded kaolin quarries.

== History ==
The first written mention of Hroznětín is from 1213, when King Ottokar I donated the settlement to Hroznata of Ovenec, founder of the Teplá Abbey. After his death is 1217, Hroznětín became a property of the abbey. Around 1333, the village was promoted to a town by King John of Bohemia. In 1434, Hroznětín was bought by Emperor Sigismund, who pawned it to Kaspar Schlick. In 1499, the Jewish getto was established in the town.

The Schlick family owned Hroznětín until 1585, when they sold it to Ernst von Wirsperk. His descendants then sold it to rich burgers in 1603. After Hroznětín was confiscated as a result of the Bohemian Revolt, Duke Julius Henry of Saxe-Lauenburg bought it in 1623. During the rule of Julius Henry and his son Julius Francis, Hroznětín experienced the greatest development. In 1680, the town was acquired by Louis William, Margrave of Baden-Baden.

== Demographics ==
Historical population

| Year | Pop. | ±% |
|---|---|---|
| 1869 | 2,286 | — |
| 1880 | 2,339 | +2.3% |
| 1890 | 2,483 | +6.2% |
| 1900 | 2,804 | +12.9% |
| 1910 | 2,707 | −3.5% |

| Year | Pop. | ±% |
|---|---|---|
| 1921 | 2,382 | −12.0% |
| 1930 | 2,615 | +9.8% |
| 1950 | 1,333 | −49.0% |
| 1961 | 1,356 | +1.7% |
| 1970 | 1,592 | +17.4% |

| Year | Pop. | ±% |
|---|---|---|
| 1980 | 1,481 | −7.0% |
| 1991 | 1,514 | +2.2% |
| 2001 | 1,633 | +7.9% |
| 2011 | 1,861 | +14.0% |
| 2021 | 2,015 | +8.3% |

Source: Censuses

== Transport ==
Hroznětín is located on a railway line of local importance heading from Karlovy Vary to Merklín.

== Sights ==
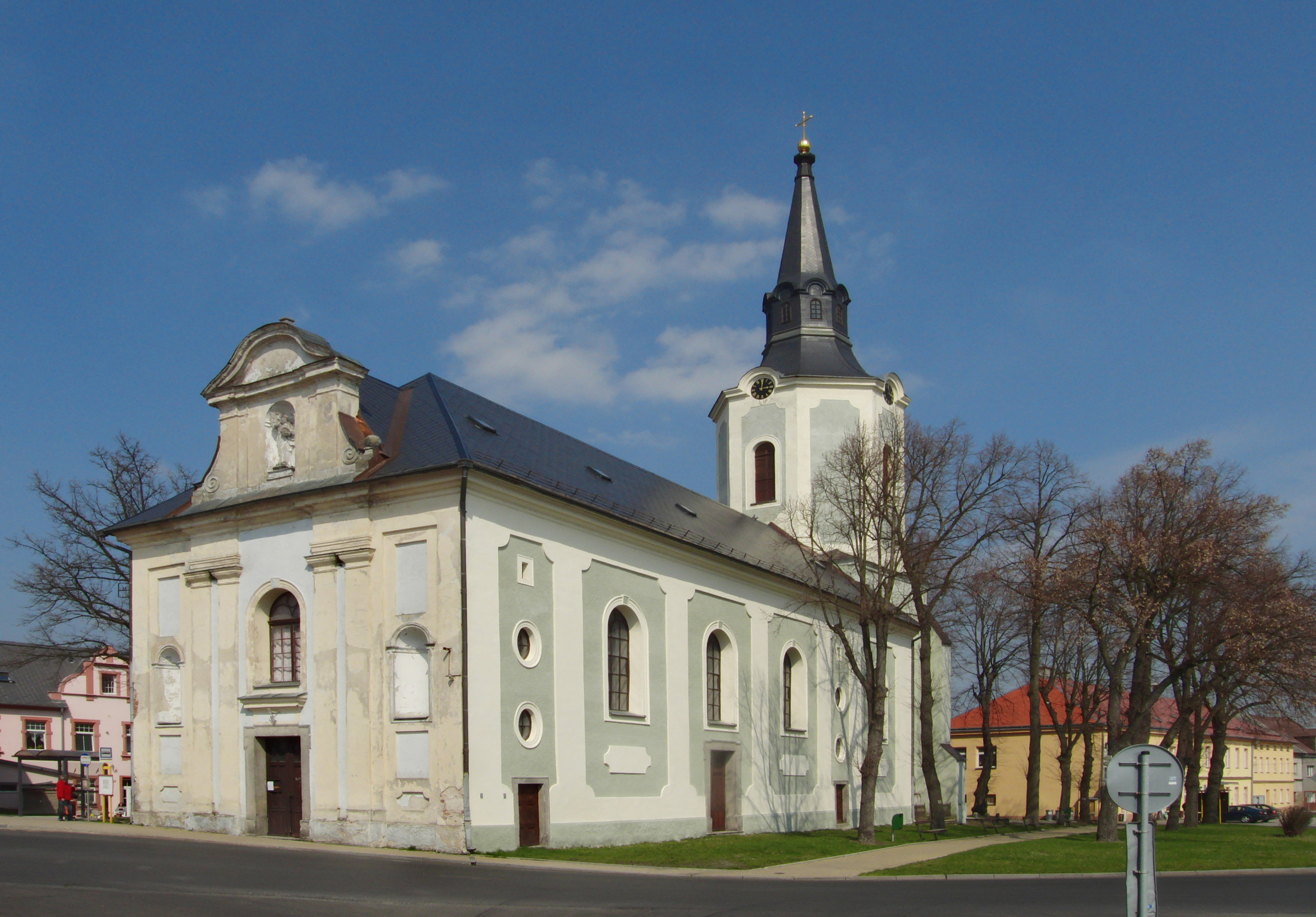
Church of Saints Peter and Paul

The main landmark of Hroznětín is the Church of Saints Peter and Paul. It was built in the Romanesque style in 1217, then it was rebuilt in the Baroque style in 1732–1734.

The Chapel of Saint John of Nepomuk is located in Bystřice. It is a valuable late Baroque chapel dating from 1768.

There is a Jewish cemetery, which is among the oldest in Central Europe. It was probably established in the 15th century. The preserved gravestones date from the 17th–20th centuries.

== Notable people ==
- Věra Nosková (born 1947), writer and journalist
