= Vlastimil Horváth =

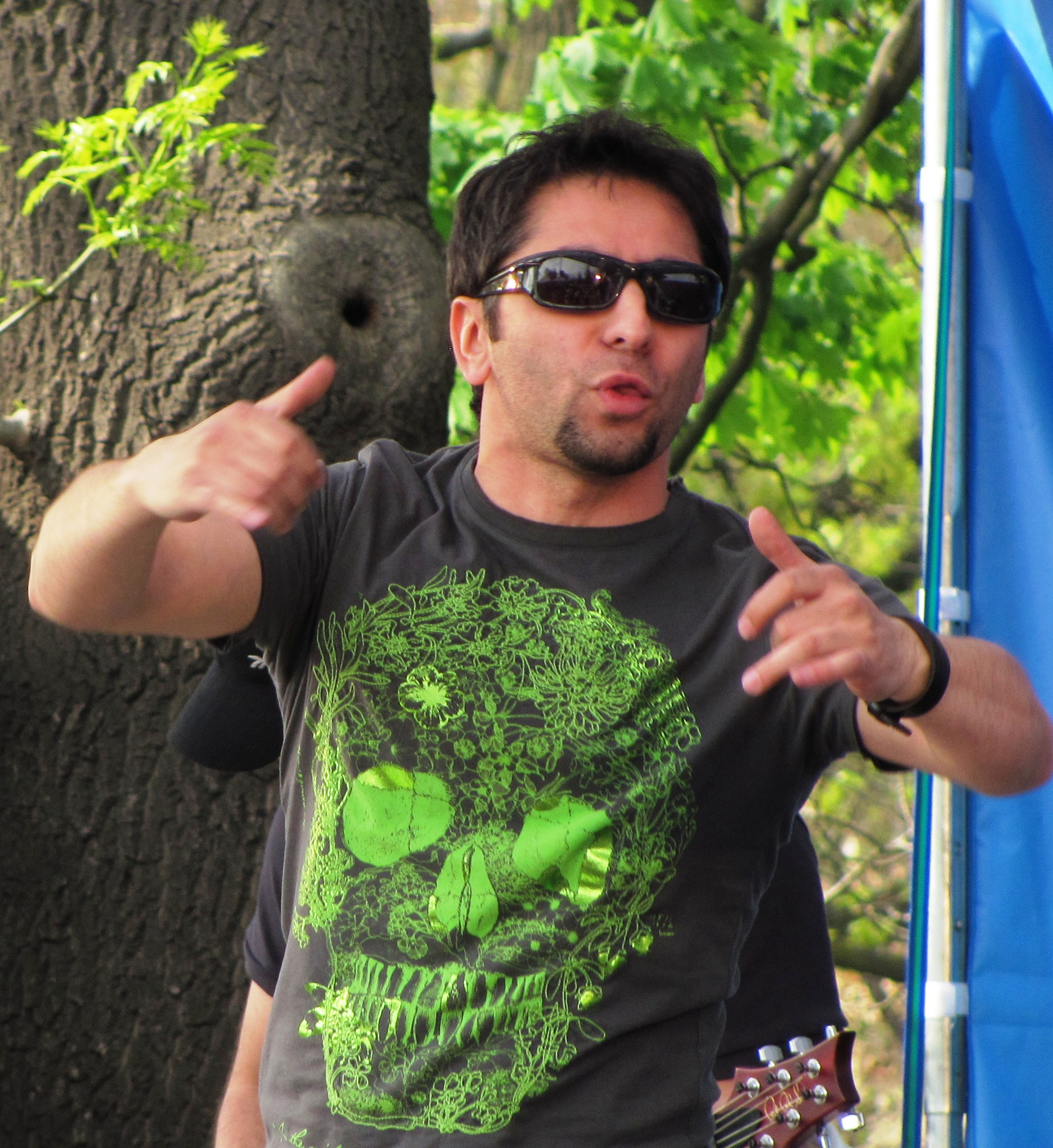
- Horváth in 2010

Background information
- Born: 18 October 1977 (age 48); Čerčany, Czechoslovakia
- Occupation: Singer
- Instrument: Vocals
- Website: www.vlastahorvath.cz

Vlastimil Horváth (born 18 October 1977) is a Czech singer and winner of the second Česko hledá SuperStar show. He is of Roma origin.

== Discography ==
Albums

- Česko hledá SuperStar Top 12 (June 2005)
- Místo zázraků (October 2005)
- Do peří nefoukej (November 2006)

Singles

- Co tě napadá
- Adios
