= Šárka Vaňková =

Czech singer (born 1987)

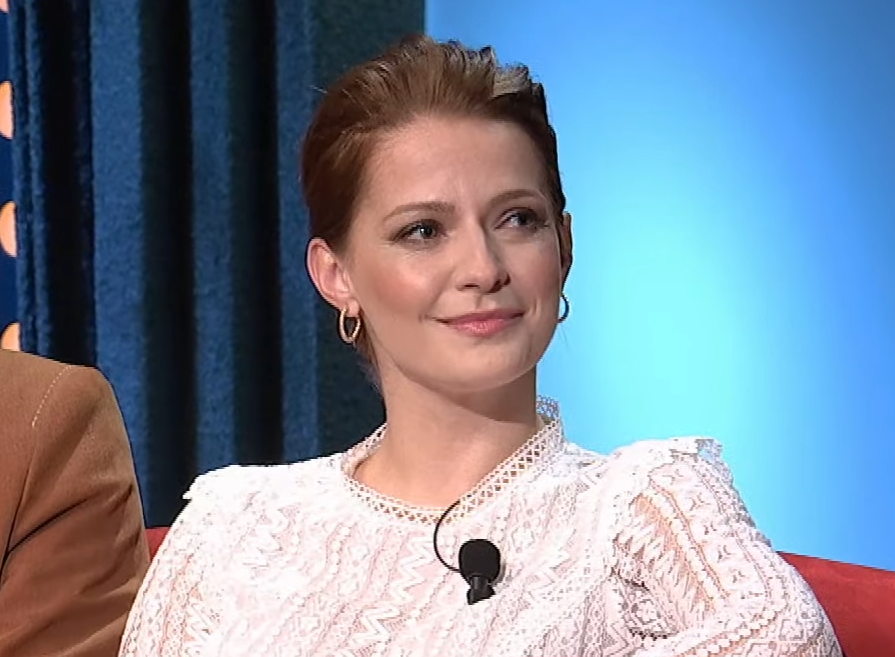
- Šárka Vaňková (2024)

Background information
- Born: 30 October 1987 (age 38); Chrudim, Czechoslovakia
- Occupation: Singer
- Instrument: Vocals

Šárka Vaňková (born 30 October 1987) is a Czech singer.

== Biography ==
She was born in Chrudim and raised in Jirkov. She was a contestant on Česko hledá SuperStar (a.k.a. Pop Idol) in 2004. After finishing in second place with 621,235 votes, Vaňková released her first CD. In May 2006, she released her second album called Teď a Tady ("Now And Here") which is a mix of pop and funky music with elements of jazz or even swing. Vaňková lives in Jirkov and attends school in Most.

== Discography ==
Albums

- Česko hledá SuperStar Top 10 (June 2004)
- Věřím náhodám (26 November 2004)
- Teď a tady (May 2006)

Singles

- Lásku dávej
- Nechci být jenom tvůj sen
- Věřím náhodám
