= Broadway Theatre (Prague) =

Theatre in the Czech Republic

- Divadlo Broadway
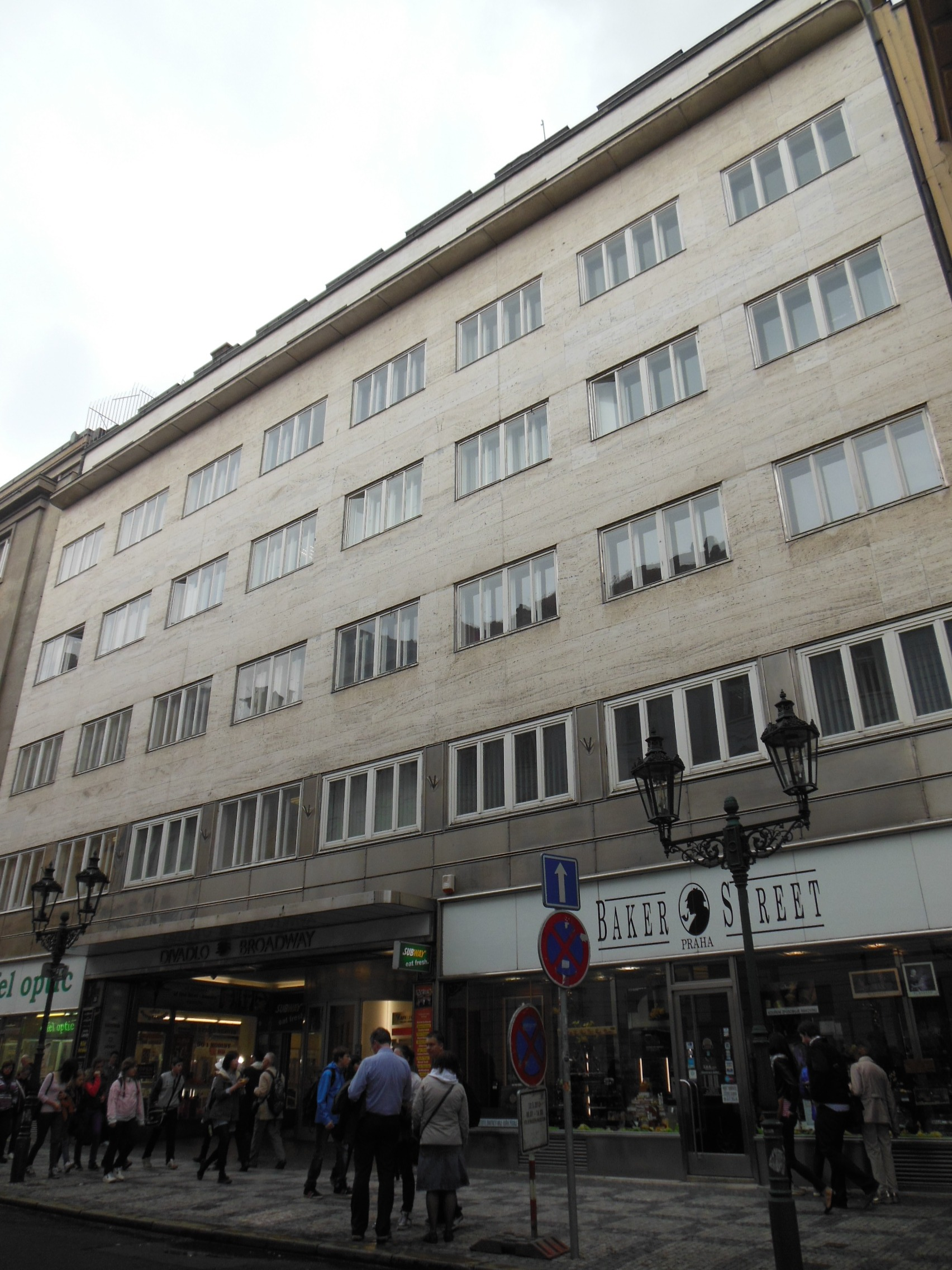
- Broadway Theatre, Prague.
- Interactive map of Broadway Theatre
- Address: Na Příkopě 988/31; Prague 1 Czech Republic
- Coordinates: 50°5′12″N 14°25′37″E

Construction
- Opened: 2002

Website
- Official website

Broadway Theatre (Czech: Divadlo Broadway) is a theatre in Prague, Czech Republic. It is situated in the Celetná and Na příkopě streets of the Old Town district of Prague. It opened in 2002. It focuses on production of musicals.

Broadway Theatre is a part of the Palace Sevastopol, which was originally built in functionalist style in 1938. The Celetná and Na Příkopě streets are connected by Broadway Passage. The palace is listed in the register of protected buildings.

The theatre's first production was the musical Cleopatra, which made its début on 22 February 2002 and featured Bára Basiková, Ilona Csáková, Monika Absolonová and Radka Fišarová alternating in the title role.
