= Václav Jírů =

Czech photographer and writer (1910-1980)

- Born: 31 July 1910; Doubravany, Austria-Hungary
- Died: 28 June 1980 (aged 69); Prague, Czechoslovakia
- Occupations: Photographer; writer; editor

Václav Jírů (31 July 1910 – 28 June 1980) was a Czech photographer and writer. He is known for his photographs of Prague. In 1957, he founded the quarterly photography magazine Fotografie and served as its editor-in-chief until 1972.

== Biography ==
Jírů was born on 31 July 1910 in Doubravany in Austria-Hungary (now part of Košík in the Czech Republic). He took up photography at a young age, with a particular interest in the New Objectivity movement, and joined the Czech Amateur Photographers Club in 1926. He began his career as a writer and journalist, and his first photographs were published in 1927. Over the next decade Jírů published in the Czech magazines Světozor and Pestrý týden, as well as foreign magazines such as Picture Post and Lilliput. His subjects were diverse, including sporting events, theatre portraits, landscapes, and nudes. During World War II, he was arrested by the Gestapo on 22 February 1940 and sentenced to death for participating in the resistance movement against the German occupation of Czechoslovakia. The following year his sentence was commuted to life imprisonment, and he remained in several concentration camps, including the prison in Hamelin, until the end of the war in 1945.

After the war, he wrote Šesté jaro [Sixth Spring], a 252-page book describing the years he spent in prison and containing photographs that he took shortly after liberation. The book was published in 1946. Jírů's contemporaries, including the Czech writer Karel Konrád who wrote the preface to the second edition, characterized Šesté jaro as a dokumentární román ("documentary novel"). A reviewer for Books Abroad wrote that Jírů's "sketchy, staccato manner is well fitted to a vigorous account of his six horrible years under the Nazis". He continued to work on several books and photography collections in the late 1940s: Raf (1947), Slunečné pobřeží Jugoslavie [The Sunny Coast of Yugoslavia] (1948), and Zrcadlo života [The Mirror of Life] (1949). During this time, he was active in several regional artists' groups and was known for his photographs of Prague.

Jírů worked at the socialist photography magazine Nová fotografie from 1950 until it stopped publication in 1952. He chaired the editorial board of the magazine's successor, Československá fotografie, until 1957, and from 1954 to 1957 he was also the director of Tisková, ediční a propagační služba místního hospodářství, a Czech publishing house. In 1957, he founded Fotografie, an influential quarterly magazine featuring works by both Czech and foreign photographers, reviews, and news items. Jírů was the editor-in-chief of Fotografie until 1972 and succeeded by Daniela Mrázková. That same year he was elected chairman of the Union of Czech Photographers, and remained in the position for the rest of his life.

Jírů died in Prague on 28 June 1980, at the age of 69. His work is included in the collections of the Moravian Gallery in Brno, the Museum Folkwang, the Museum of Decorative Arts in Prague, the Museum of Fine Arts Houston, and more.
