= Zbyněk Drda =

Czech singer (born 1987)

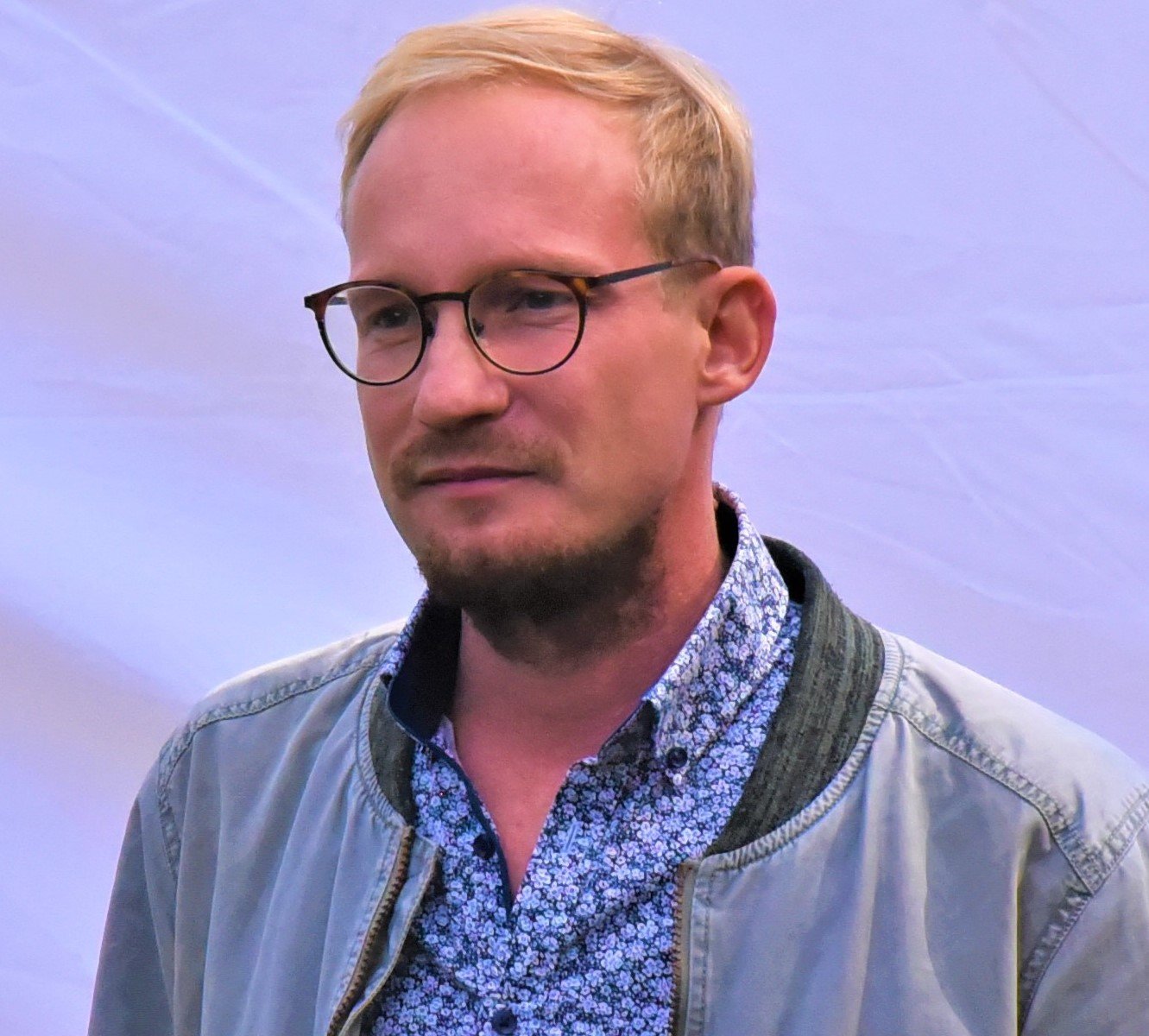
- Drda in 2020

Background information
- Born: 29 March 1987 (age 39); Ostrov, Czechoslovakia
- Genres: Pop rock
- Occupation: Singer
- Instrument: Vocals
- Years active: 2006–present
- Label: Sony BMG
- Website: drdazbynek.cz

Zbyněk Drda (born 29 March 1987) is a Czech singer. In December 2006, Drda became the winner of the third edition of Česko hledá SuperStar.

== Biography ==
Drda comes from a Czech-Russian family. In his youth, he demonstrated an aptitude for music and sports, and took part in karate, volleyball, and lifeguarding. Although he sang since he was a child, he gained fame only when he participated in the third season of the reality television singing competition Česko hledá SuperStar, the Czech version of the Idol series. Drda won third place on 17 December 2006.

After this victory, Drda recorded his debut album, titled Pohled do očí, which was released in April 2007. The record became a bestseller. In the 2007 Český slavík awards, Drda won the "Skokan roku", i.e. the Best Newcomer award.

In 2018, Drda released his second solo album, titled Záhadná.

== Česko hledá SuperStar performances ==
Stage	Song	Artist
Top 10 Boys	If Tomorrow Never Comes	Ronan Keating
Top 8 Boys	Nikdy to nevzdám	Janek Ledecký
Top 6 Boys	Can You Feel the Love Tonight	Elton John
Top 10	Maybe	Enrique Iglesias
Top 9	Another Day in Paradise	Phil Collins
Top 8	Learning to Fly	Tom Petty and the Heartbreakers
Top 7	Jednou mi fotr povídá	Ivan Hlas
Top 6	SOS	ABBA
Top 6	Yesterday	The Beatles
Top 5	Take On Me	A-ha
Top 5	Štěstí je krásná věc	Richard Müller
Top 4	Čas sluhů	Jan Kalousek
Top 4	Raindrops Keep Fallin' on My Head	B. J. Thomas
Top 3	Sliby se maj plnit o Vánocích	Janek Ledecký
Top 3	Last Christmas	Wham!
Grand Finale	Srdce pátrají	–
Grand Finale	Can You Feel the Love Tonight	Elton John
Grand Finale	Mandy	Westlife

== Discography ==
- Pohled do očí (2007)
- Záhadná (2018)
