= Ilona Csáková =

Czech singer (born 1970)

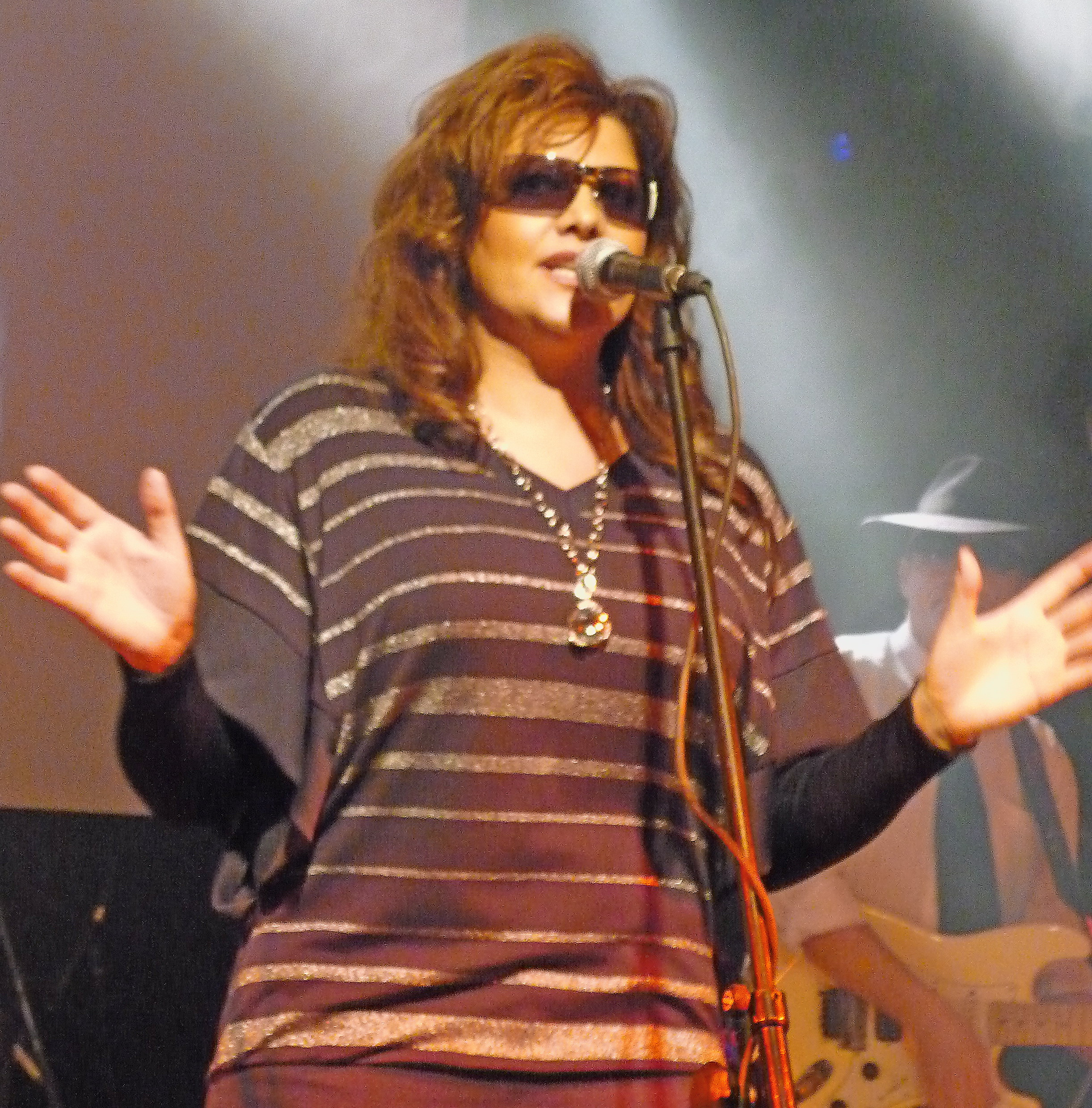

Background information
- Born: 1 October 1970 (age 55)
- Origin: Cheb, Czechoslovakia
- Years active: 1993–present
- Labels: Sony Music (1993), Monitor/EMI (1995–present)
- Website: https://csakova.cz/

Ilona Csáková (born 1 October 1970, Cheb) is a Czech popular singer. She has released ten solo albums, and was the best-selling singer in the Czech Republic in 1998. She also appeared as a judge on reality TV music competition Česko hledá SuperStar (Czech Superstar).

== Biography ==
Csáková was born in Cheb, Czechoslovakia (now Czech Republic) to a Hungarian father and Romanian mother. Csáková wanted to be a singer as a child, and sang with a childhood band named Butterflies. She also learnt to play the guitar, and played the drums in the school orchestra in Klášterec nad Ohří. She participated in her first singing competition in 1985, and was a part of the girl group Alotrio. At the end of the 1980s she did her school leaving exams at pedagogical high school in Most. in 1987, Csáková joined the group Laura A Její Tygři (English: Laura And Her Tigers) which made a few recordings and toured countries including Bulgaria, France and Germany.

In 1992, Csáková left the group due to artistic stagnation. She became part of a project involving composer Martin Kučaj and banker A. Komanický, which produced a single, "Rituál", and some videos. She also collaborated with Lucie Bílá.

Csáková's debut solo album, Kosmopolis, was published by Sony Music in 1993, and she won a Gramy Award in the category Newcomer of the Year. She played the role of Sheila in a revival of the musical Hair, and in 1995 she released her second studio album, Amsterdam. This album and subsequent albums were released on the EMI label. In 1996 she performed on her first tour with her third new studio album Pink during which she was the support act at Tina Turner's concert in Prague. Later she won a Czech music award as The Second Best Singer (female), which she won again for the next two years. In 1998, she recorded Modrý Sen (Blue Dream), performing cover versions of songs including "La Isla Bonita", "I Say a Little Prayer" and "Je t'aime... moi non-plus". In 1998 she was the best selling singer in the Czech Republic. Her following albums Blízká I Vzdálená (Near and Far at Once) (1999) and Tyrkys (Turquoise) (2000), were less successful. Her autobiography Můj soukromý Řím (My Private Rome) was released in 1999.

In 2002 Ilona Csáková performed the title role in the Czech musical, Kleopatra, at Prague's Broadway Theatre, and made a new album of dance music, Kruhy mé touhy (Rings of My Desire). Around this time, she returned to working with her former music group Laura A Její Tygři, joining them for a brief tour. In 2005, she performed blues and jazz songs including "Summertime", "Now Or Never", "Kansas City", and "Black Coffee". In 2006 she became a judge in Season 3 of the Czech TV musical competition Česko hledá SuperStar (Czech Superstar). After that, she performed in other Czech musicals like Mistr Jan Hus (2005) and Golem (2006). After a 6-year break from studio recording, she recorded a new album entitled Ilona Csaková (2008).

== Personal life ==
Csáková lives in Brno with her partner Radek Voneš. They have one son, Daniel (born 22 September 2009).

== Discography ==
=== With Laura a její tygři ===
- Žár trvá (1988)
- Nebudeme (1990)
- Síla v nás (1992)
- The best of Laura a její tygři (1994)
- Vyškrábu ti oči (2004)
- …Jsme tady! (Best of) (2005)

=== Rituál ===
- Rituál (1992) (EP)

=== Solo albums ===
- Kosmopolis (Cosmopolis) (1993)
- Amsterdam (1995)
- Pink (1996)
- Modrý sen (Blue Dream) (1998)
- Blízká i vzdálená (Near and Far) (1999)
- Tyrkys (Turquoise) (2000)
- Kruhy mé touhy (Circles of My Desire) (2002)
- 22x – Best of (2004)
- Ilona Csáková (2008)
- Noc kouzelná / to nejlepší - Best of (Night Magic / The Best) (2013)

=== DVD ===
- 22x – Best of (2004)
- Karel Svoboda 65 (2004)
- Na Kloboučku – Best Sessions Part 2 (2007)

== Musicals ==
- Hair/Vlasy (1997) – Sheila Franklin
- Kleopatra (2002) – Kleopatra
- Mistr Jan Hus (2005) – královna Žofie
- Golem (2006) – hostinská Rozina
- Tři mušketýři (2008) – královna Anna
