= Lično =

- Municipality
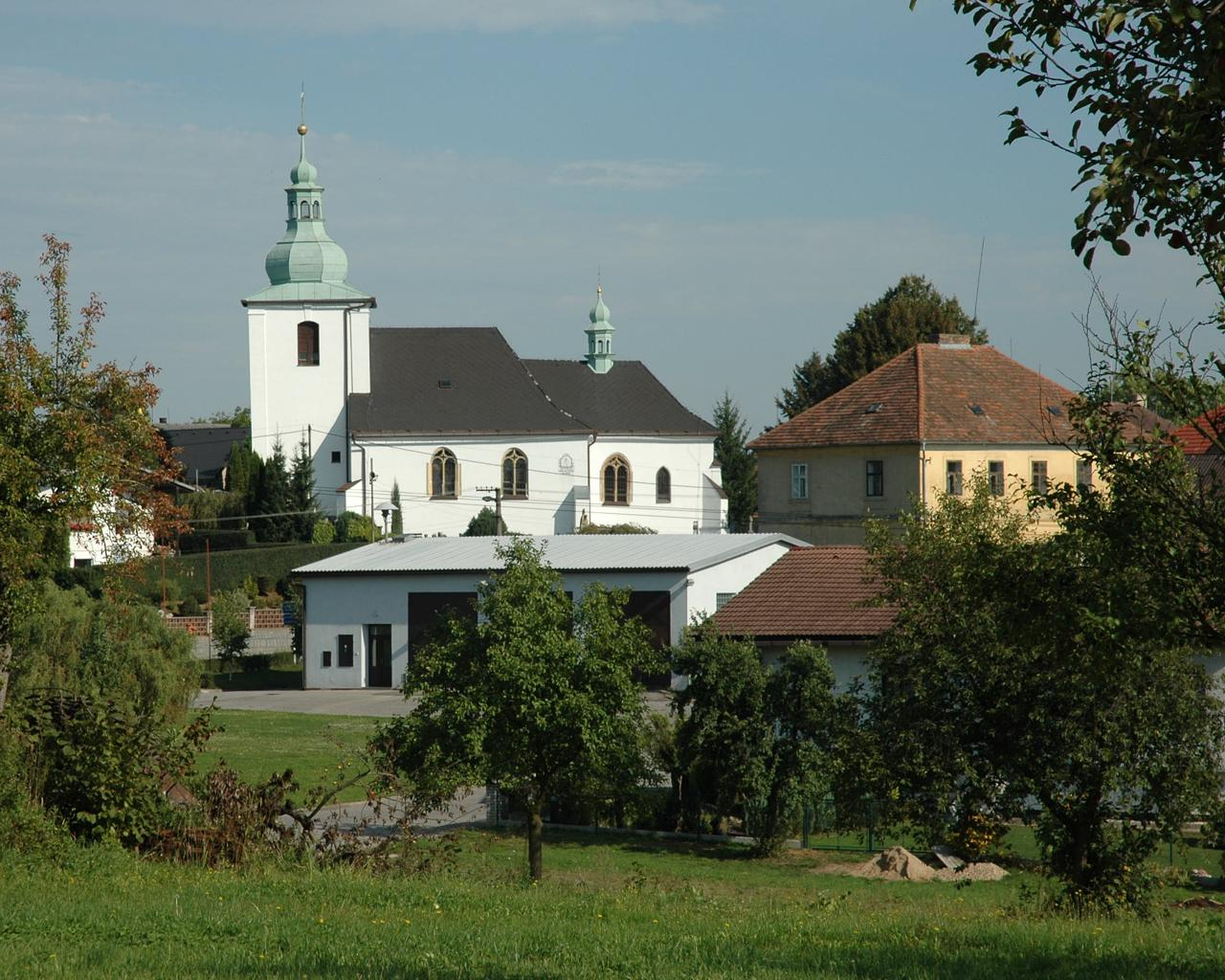
- Church of the Annunciation of the Virgin Mary

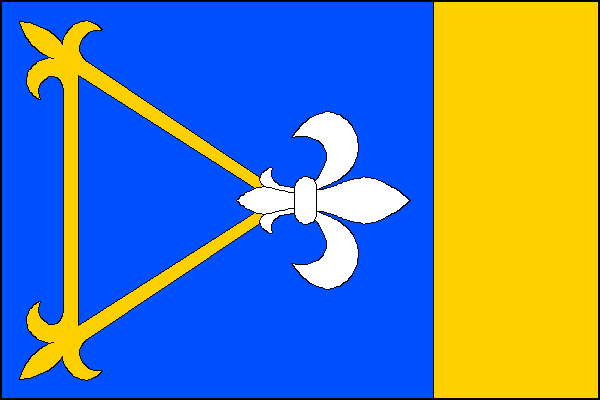
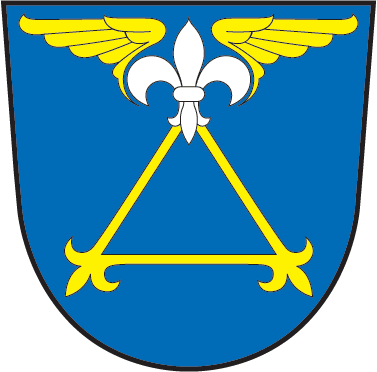
- Flag Coat of arms

- Location in the Czech Republic
- Coordinates: 50°10′40″N 16°10′20″E
- Country: Czech Republic
- Region: Hradec Králové
- District: Rychnov nad Kněžnou
- First mentioned: 1355

Area
  - Total: 6.29 km^{2} (2.43 sq mi)
- Elevation: 298 m (978 ft)

Population (2026-01-01)
  - Total: 657
  - Density: 104/km^{2} (271/sq mi)
- Time zone: UTC+1 (CET)
  - Summer (DST): UTC+2 (CEST)
- Postal codes: 517 21, 517 35
- Website: www.licno.cz

Lično is a municipality and village in Rychnov nad Kněžnou District in the Hradec Králové Region of the Czech Republic. It has about 700 inhabitants.

== Administrative division ==
Lično consists of three municipal parts (in brackets population according to the 2021 census):

- Lično (513)
- Ostašovice (78)
- Radostovice (43)

== Demographics ==
Historical population
Year	Pop.	±%
1869	907	—
1880	861	−5.1%
1890	869	+0.9%
1900	774	−10.9%
1910	764	−1.3%
1921	714	−6.5%
1930	667	−6.6%
1950	538	−19.3%
1961	564	+4.8%
1970	525	−6.9%
1980	502	−4.4%
1991	524	+4.4%
2001	566	+8.0%
2011	557	−1.6%
2021	634	+13.8%
Source: Censuses
