= Český klub skeptiků Sisyfos =

Czech skeptical nonprofit organisation

Český klub skeptiků Sisyfos Czech Skeptics' Club Sisyfos
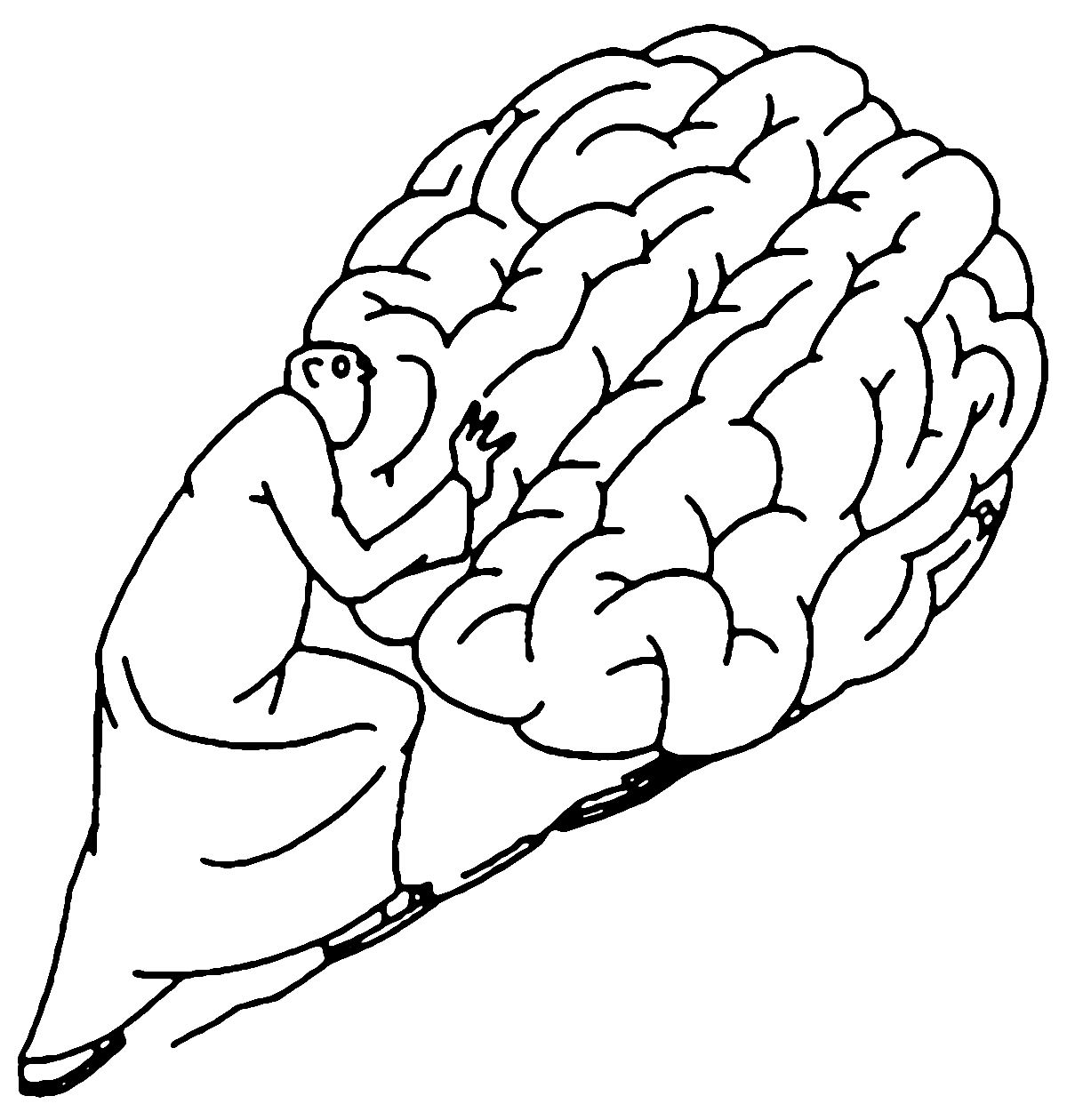
- Abbreviation: Sisyfos
- Formation: 1994-12-27
- Type: Nonprofit organisation
- Purpose: Scientific investigation of paranormal claims
- Headquarters: U Dejvického rybníčku 25/1976; 160 00 Prague 6
- Region served: Czech Republic
- President: Jaromír Šrámek
- Website: sisyfos.cz

Český klub skeptiků Sisyfos (English: Czech Skeptics' Club Sisyfos) is a Czech skeptical nonprofit organisation founded in 1994 and headquartered in Prague. Its primary goal and mission is to spread and defend the findings and results of contemporary science, to promote rational, critical thinking, to acquaint the public with the principles of scientific method, to speak out against the spread of paranormal ideas and unproven procedures, to ensure that universities, scientific societies and institutions are actively responsible for defending science and critical thinking, to investigate controversies and false claims, to provide assistance to citizens in protecting against fraudulent products and ineffective or dangerous alternative medicine products and healing methods. In line with mission and goals, the club refuses to interfere with religious, moral and political issues.

== Organization ==
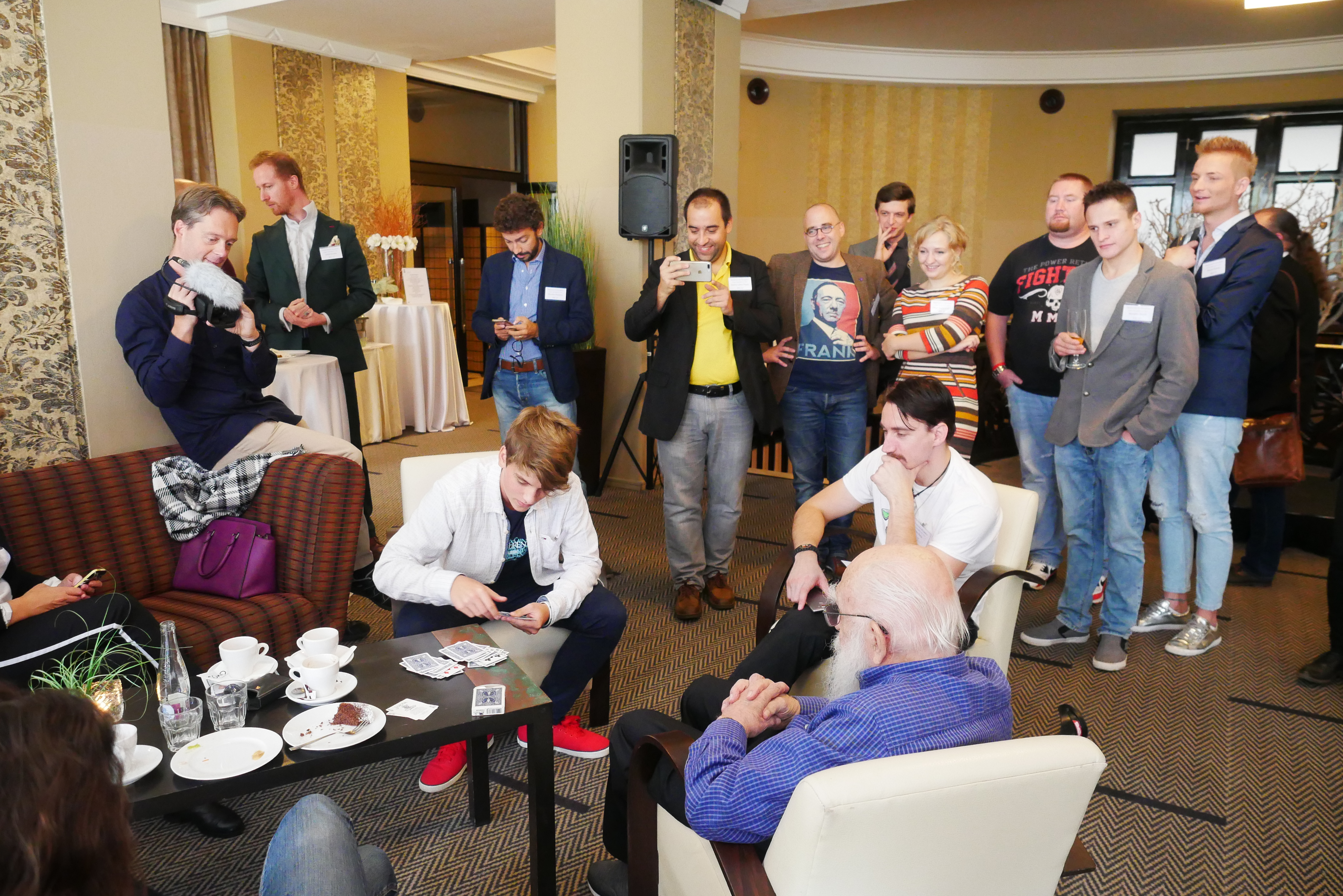
James Randi performs a card trick at a 2017 Sisyfos event in Prague.

The organization has around 400 members. It is a partner of the American Committee for Skeptical Inquiry and is a member of the European Council of Skeptical Organisations (ECSO). Since 2000, it is a member of the Czech organisation Rada vědeckých společností České republiky (The Council of Scientific Societies of the Czech Republic). Some of the leading members include the astronomer and science communicator Jiří Grygar and the publicist Věra Nosková. The name of the organization refers to mythological Sisyphus and it symbolises the founders' belief that Labors of Sisyphus (long and ultimately unsuccessful work) await them.

=== Chairpersons ===
- MUDr. Ivan David, CSc.
- prof. MUDr. Jiří Heřt, DrSc.
- Věra Nosková
- doc. RNDr. Čeněk Zlatník, CSc.
- Bc. Leoš Kyša
- MUDr. Jaromír Šrámek

== Activities ==
The organisation publishes the Sisyfos newspaper online and as a daily press, organises the series of lectures called Věda kontra iracionalita (Science vs Irrationality), publishes several book collections and offers a paranormal challenge. It has also participated in the worldwide 10:23 campaign to raise awareness about the inefficacy of homeopathy.

=== Paranormal challenge ===
Claire Klingenberg explains Sisyfos' paranormal challenge (2017).

Sisyfos offers 3,400,000 Kč (about €143,000 anno 2023) to anyone who can prove paranormal phenomena.

=== Erratic Boulder award ===
The organisation issues an anti-award called Bludný balvan (Erratic Boulder) "to highlight the contribution of individuals and societies in misleading the Czech public, and the development of a muddy way of thinking."

=== Newsletter Sisyfos ===
Since 1995, the organisation issues a periodic newsletter three or four times a year entitled Neperiodický zpravodaj občanského sdružení Sisyfos (Non-periodical Report of the Sisyfos Organisation). It contains articles by Czech and foreign experts, as well as current events inside the organisation. The newsletter is available free of charge on the website since 2000.

=== Events ===
In 2017, Český klub skeptiků Sisyfos and Klub Sceptyków Polskich organised the seventeenth European Skeptics Congress (ESC). The ESC has been held every two years since 1989, each time hosted by a different member of the European Council of Skeptical Organisations (ECSO). The Congress included lectures and panels, and involved discussion on topics such as science and religion, exorcisms and genetically modified organisms. Speakers included Amardeo Sarma, Gerald Ostdiek, Holm Gero Hümmler and Mark Lynas as well as many others. Also, Massimo Polidoro interviewed James Randi on the topic of paranormal investigation. Free, public workshops also ran during the Congress on topics like "Quantum Mechanics vs Common Sense", "What can we infer from children's drawings", and "Mission to Mars".

== Sisyfos and religion ==
According to its mission statement, the organisation refuses to interfere within the religious area. The members of the club are both atheists and religious believers. Nevertheless, several articles on the issue of science, skepticism and religion were published. After an internal debate among the members, in February 2001 the organisation finally decided that, for practical reasons, it will not deal with religious issues.
