= Sallie Aley Hert =

American politician (1863–1948)

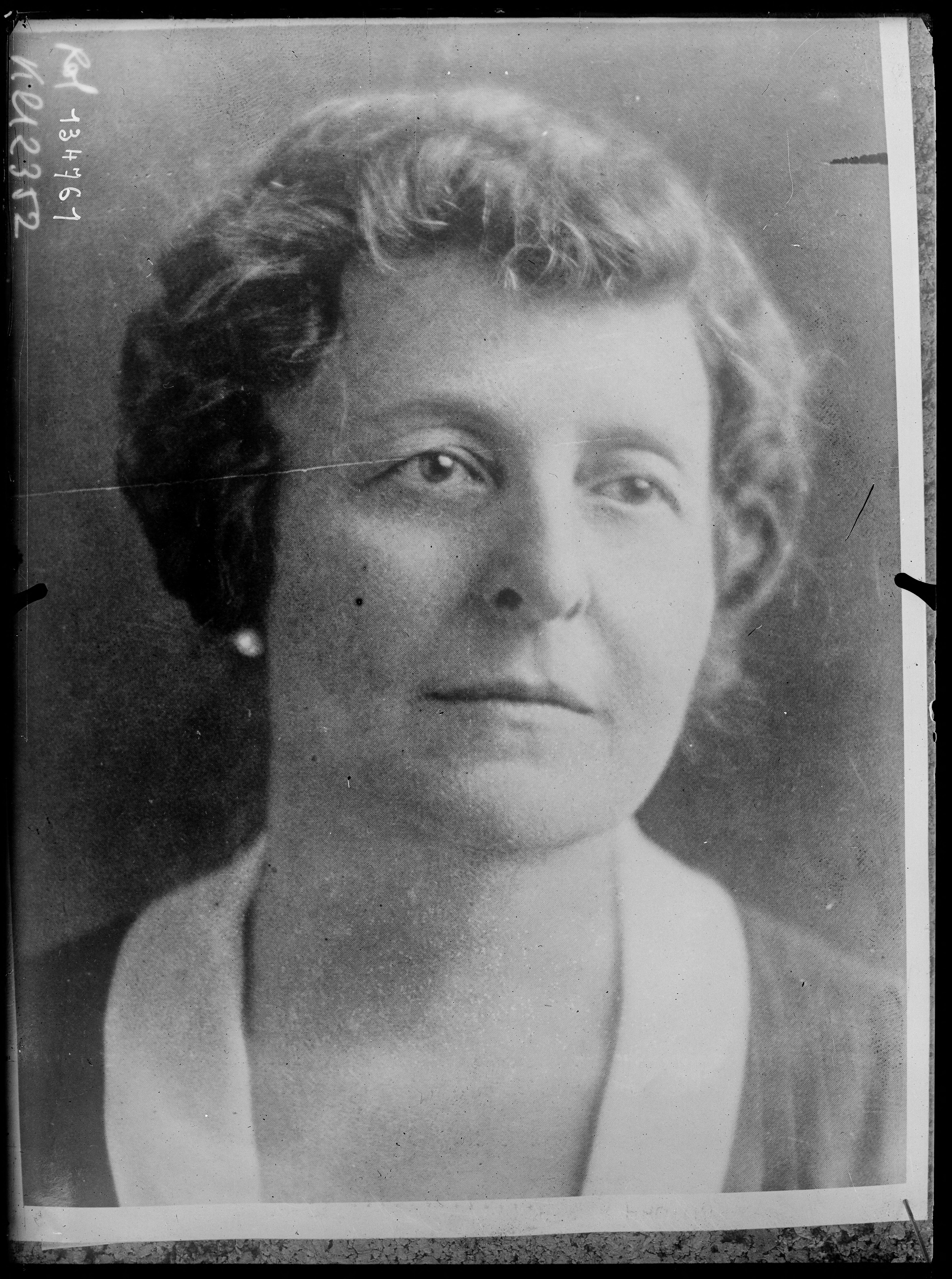
- Born: Sallie Aley; 1863
- Died: 1948 (aged 84–85)
- Resting place: Cave Hill Cemetery; Louisville, Kentucky, U.S.
- Spouse: Alvin Tobias Hert (m. 1893; died 1921)

Sallie Aley Hert (1863 – 1948) was vice chairman of the Republican National Committee from 1924 to 1936. She was the state chairwoman of the Republican women of Kentucky. She headed the national Republican National Committee women's organization.

== Biography ==
She was born in 1863 as Sallie Aley. She married Alvin Tobias Hert (1865–1921) on November 20, 1893. She was vice chairman of the Republican National Committee from 1924 to 1936. She died in 1948. She was buried at Cave Hill Cemetery in Louisville, Kentucky.
