= Košík =

- Municipality
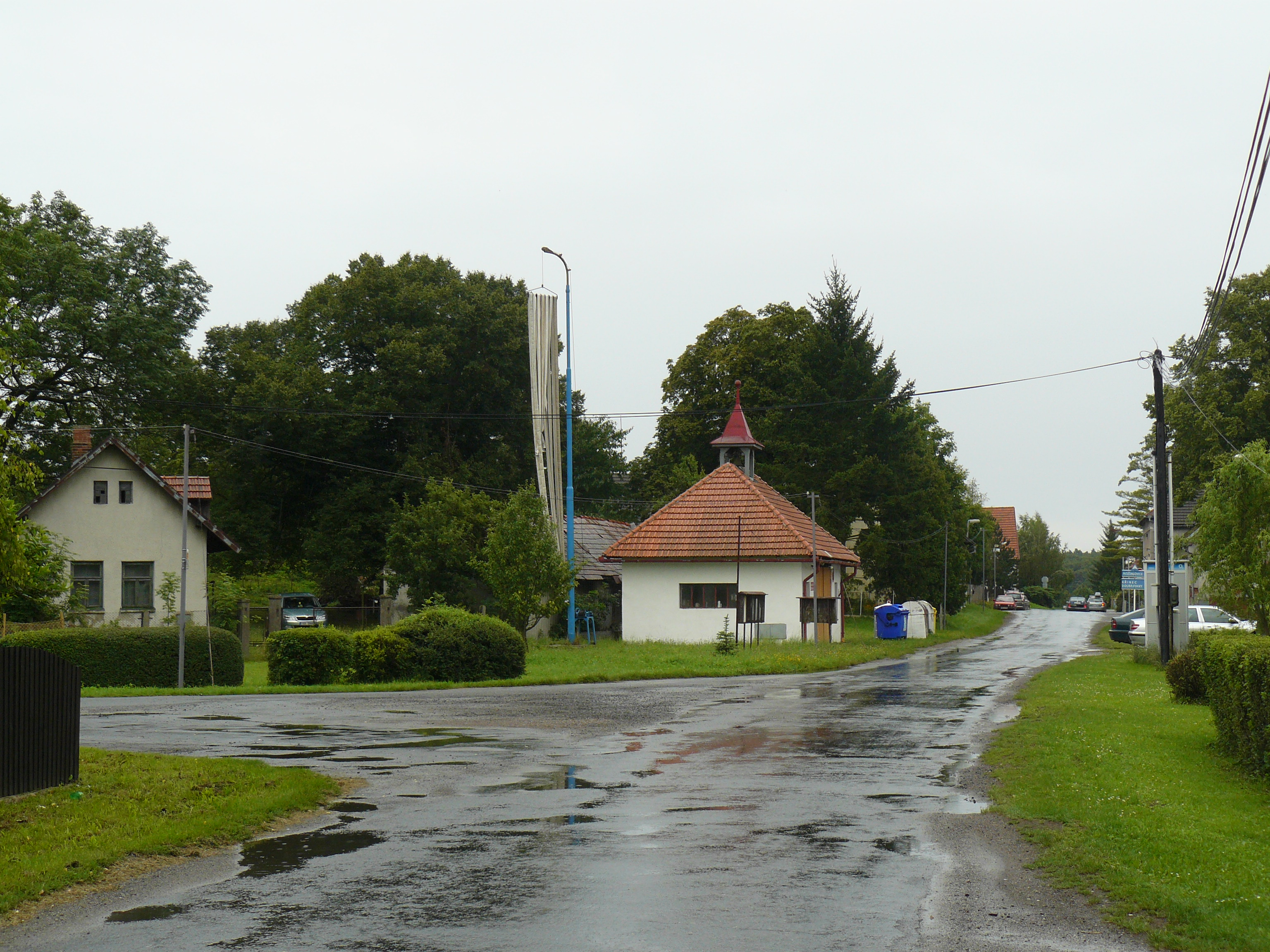
- Centre of Košík

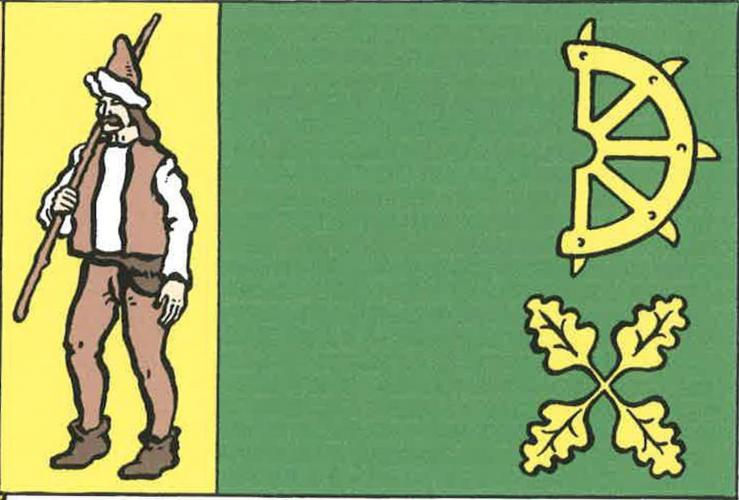
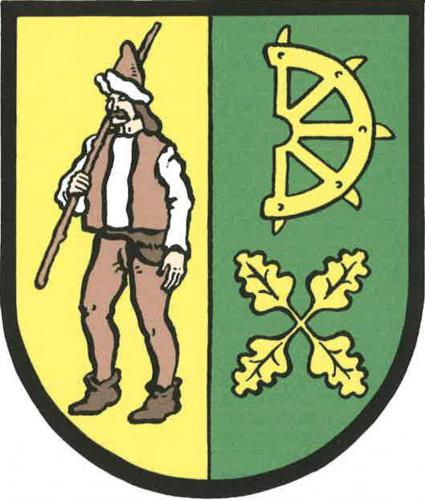
- Flag Coat of arms

- Location in the Czech Republic
- Coordinates: 50°19′6″N 15°8′3″E
- Country: Czech Republic
- Region: Central Bohemian
- District: Nymburk
- First mentioned: 1420

Area
  - Total: 14.69 km^{2} (5.67 sq mi)
- Elevation: 223 m (732 ft)

Population (2026-01-01)
  - Total: 361
  - Density: 24.6/km^{2} (63.6/sq mi)
- Time zone: UTC+1 (CET)
  - Summer (DST): UTC+2 (CEST)
- Postal code: 289 35
- Website: www.kosik-obec.cz

Košík is a municipality and village in Nymburk District in the Central Bohemian Region of the Czech Republic. It has about 400 inhabitants.

== Administrative division ==
Košík consists of four municipal parts (in brackets population according to the 2021 census):

- Košík (188)
- Doubravany (90)
- Sovolusky (4)
- Tuchom (69)

== Demographics ==
Historical population
Year	Pop.	±%
1869	1,112	—
1880	1,205	+8.4%
1890	1,188	−1.4%
1900	1,109	−6.6%
1910	1,071	−3.4%
1921	1,019	−4.9%
1930	924	−9.3%
1950	672	−27.3%
1961	614	−8.6%
1970	536	−12.7%
1980	463	−13.6%
1991	400	−13.6%
2001	340	−15.0%
2011	356	+4.7%
2021	351	−1.4%
Source: Censuses

== Notable people ==
- Václav Jírů (1910–1980), photographer and writer
