= Věra Nosková =

Czech writer (born 1947)

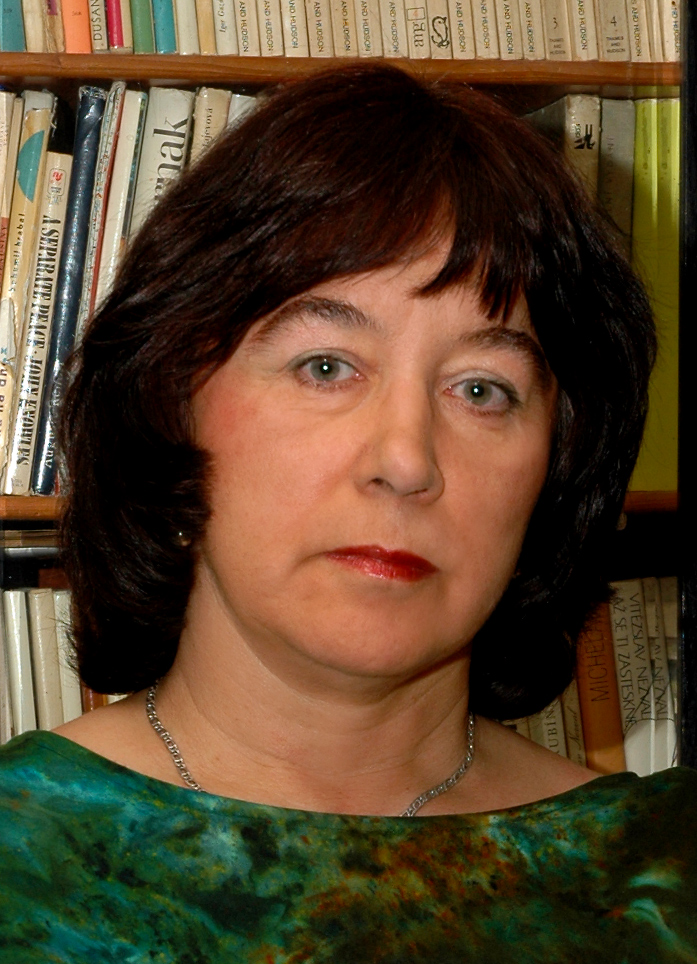
Věra Nosková in 2006

Věra Nosková (born 9 April 1947) is a Czech writer, journalist and promoter of science and critical thinking.

== Life ==
Nosková was born on 9 April 1947in Hroznětín, Czechoslovakia. Her parents moved to Strakonice soon after her birth. She grew up there as the oldest of three children and enrolled at the local grammar school. Soon after completing studies she left home, seeking independence. She experienced hardship in a variety of low-paid jobs (shop-fitter, labourer, railway level crossing gate operator, confectioner, cleaning lady, draughtswoman of the Architects´ Cooperative, Conservationists´ archive-keeper, employee of a public education organisation, waitress). In early 1970s she moved to Prague, married young scientist and gave birth to two sons. Before 1989, she attended correspondence class at the Secondary Pedagogical School and then worked at nursery school and as a night governess in a student dormitory at Haštalská street in Prague.

After 1989, she started a new career as newspaper journalist and external radio staffer. Since 2003, she has largely devoted time to her own fiction, but continued writing essays for journals. Later she established her own publishing house, which has issued publications on popular science by respected members of the skeptical club Český klub skeptiků Sisyfos, prosaic works by other authors and also her own novels and stories.

Věra Nosková was a co-founder of the voluntary association of Czech skeptics and for three years also president of the Český klub skeptiků Sisyfos. She is a member of the Czech center of the International PEN Club. In 2013 Nosková received the Hessian Literature Scholarship, an award granted as part of the Czech-German literary partnership. As a literary scholarship holder, she stayed in Wiesbaden, Kraków and Bratislava. Věra Nosková lives in Prague.

== Work ==
=== Poetry ===
In the 1960s and 1970s, she published in journals Wild wine ("Divoké víno") and Literary monthly ("Literární měsíčník"). Her poetry was also presented on stage in "Zelené peří" (Green feathers), performed by Mirek Kovářík in Rubín theatre, Prague. Her first collection of poems set for print by the Růže publishing house in České Budějovice in early 1980s was banned shortly before publication. Collection of poetry Ink paddle ("Inkoustové pádlo") was published in 1988.

=== Journalism ===
After 1989, she started new job as secretary and editor of Czech diary ("Český deník"), then editor of Week ("Týden") (a rural magazine), reporter of the picture supplement of tabloid newspaper Blesk, editor of Europress (Bauer Media) and finally as co-author of the supplement Science and people ("Věda a lidé") of the newspaper Hospodářské noviny. She cooperated externally with newspapers Lidové noviny and MF DNES, Czech journals Reflex, Print and Publishing, Packaging, Sanquist, Listy, and with Rozmer and Prometheus in Slovakia.

In the nineties, she hosted the programme called Our theme ("Naše téma") on the Czech Radio station Vltava and contributes essays for the Radio weekly since then. In addition to articles popularising science, she has mainly been writing reportages, interviews and essays.

She also treated several topics for television programmes in a series Twilight Witch ("Klekánice") (Czech TV 2) and In your own eyes ("Na vlastní oči") (TV Nova).

=== Fiction ===
Since 1996, she has published 10 books of fiction, two collections of poetry, two books of essays, children´s tale, a travel book and two books focussed on sociological phenomena. Her first novella, reflecting previous experience from journalist work, called That man will die ("Ten muž zemře") was published by Čs. spisovatel publishers in 1996. Her fourth book – a novel called We take what comes ("Bereme co je") – was first published as samizdat. The book stirred interest of readers and was later issued regularly in somewhat abridged version by the National Theatre Subscriber publishing house in 2005. The book was labelled a "generation novel" by professional critics, was nominated for the Magnesia Litera award and became a bestseller. This autobiographic text on growing up in a small town was the first volume of a trilogy. The second volume Occupied ("Obsazeno"), nominated for the Josef Škvorecký award, is a dense and expressive description of the times after the occupation in 1968. The third volume We have our truth ("Víme svý") closes the trilogy by introducing the atmosphere of the period of normalization in a small borderland town.

The collection of humorous short stories and essays Let the girls cry ("Ať si holky popláčou") was nominated for the Božena Němcová award. After completion of the trilogy of novels, Věra Nosková returned to the themes of her journalist work, and later, in response to the feminist expansion and hidden dramas in families where the victims were men, she published a title at the margin of the genre called Let´s protect men ("Chraňme muže"), followed by Men´s stories ("Příběhy mužů").

In 2013, selected poetry by Věra Nosková was published (To be a poet, "Být básnířkou"), followed by a novel Transformations ("Proměny"). The latter was awarded with the Czech Book Reader´s Prize and a scholarship in the following year.

In 2014, reedition of revised and expanded collection of short stories Let the girls cry ("Ať si holky popláčou") was followed by children´s book Friend Jak (September 2014). Her most recent books include collection of essays (Nobleness and Style, 2015) and a travel book from Thailand and Vietnam Leave Your Dog at Home (2016).

=== Bibliography ===
- Inkoustové pádlo (Ink paddle), poetry, (Středočeské nakladatelství (Central Bohemian publishing house), 1988)
- Ten muž zemře (The man will die), novella, (Český spisovatel (Czech Writer publishing house), 1995) ISBN 80-202-0632-9
- Je to hustý (This is thick), short texts, (Věra Nosková publishing house, Prague, 2003)
- Bereme, co je (We take what comes), novel (1st edition V. Nosková publishing house, Prague, 2005) ISBN 80-903320-2-1 (2nd edition Abonent ND (National Theatre Subscriber publishers), Prague, 2005 ), (3rd edition V. Nosková publishing house, Prague, 2010) ISBN 978-80-87373-04-0, Audio book, Radio service, Prague 2010, German edition 2016
- Ať si holky popláčou (Let the girls cry), feuilletons and short texts (Abonent ND, Prague, 2006) ISBN 80-7258-255-0
- Obsazeno (Occupied), novel (1st edition MozART, Prague, 2007) ISBN 978-80-903891-0-6, (2nd edition V. Nosková publishing house, Prague, 2011) ISBN 978-80-87373-17-0
- Ve stínu mastodonta (In the shadow of mastodon), short stories (V. Nosková publishing house, Prague, 2008) ISBN 978-80-903320-5-8
- Víme svý (We have our truth), novel (V. Nosková publishing house, Prague, 2008) ISBN 978-80-903320-7-2
- Ještě se uvidí (We will see), three novellas (V. Nosková publishing house, Prague, 2009) ISBN 978-80-903320-9-6
- Přece by nám nelhali (They cannot lie to us), feuilletons (V. Nosková publishing house, Prague, 2010) ISBN 978-80-87373-06-4
- Chraňme muže (Le us protect men), (V. Nosková publishing house, Prague, 2010) ISBN 978-80-87373-05-7
- Příběhy mužů (Men ´s stories), (Klika publishers, Prague, 2012) ISBN 978-80-87373-32-3
- Být básnířkou (To be a poet), poetry (Klika publishers, Prague 2013) ISBN 978-80-87373-39-2
- Proměny (Transformations), novel (Klika publishers, Prague 2013) ISBN 978-80-87373-38-5
- Ať si holky popláčou (Let the girls cry), short stories (Klika publishers, Prague 2014), ISBN 978-80-87373-48-4
- Kamarád JAK, Children´s tale (Klika publishers, Prague 2014)
- Noblesa a styl (Nobleness and Style), essays (Klika publishers, Prague 2015)
- Nechte psa doma (Leave Your Dog at Home), travel book (Klika publishers, Prague 2016), ISBN 978-80-87373-69-9

== Popularisation of science ==
Věra Nosková initiated foundation of the Czech Skeptics' Club Sisyfos, becoming the first president of the club for several years. The founding members of the Club, whose main purpose of existence has been promotion of critical thinking, were journalists, doctors of medicine and scholars (Jiří Grygar, Václav Hořejší, Ivan David, Jiří Heřt). The Club later formed a socio-philosophical section headed by Rudolf Battěk. As a member of the Czech Sceptics´ Club, she prepared several themes which she then lectured on at several locations across the Czech Republic and in Slovakia. The Club has held periodic lectures for the public in the building of the Czech Academy of Sciences, issued its in-house Bulletin and granted the anti-prize called Bludný balvan (Erratic Block).

=== Publishing house of V. Nosková (now Klika publishers) ===
Her in-house publishing house, Věra Nosková has published professional publications of the Sisyphos Club and fiction by other authors (selection).

- Utopený Archimedes (Drown Archimedes) (A small monolingual dictionary), Prof. V. Mornstein, 2003 ISBN 978-80-903320-0-3
- Věda kontra iracionalita (Science vs. irrationality), vol. 3, miscellany of lectures, ed. Heřt J., Zlatník J.
- Věda kontra iracionalita (Science vs. irrationality), vol. 4, miscellany of lectures, ed., Heřt J., Zlatník J., 2008 ISBN 80-903320-4-8
- Výkladový slovník esoteriky a pavěd (Monolingual dictionary of esoteric and pseudo science), Prof. J. Heřt, 2008 ISBN 978-80-903320-6-5
- Alternativní medicína a léčitelství (Alternative medicine and healers), Prof. J. Heřt, 2011 ISBN 978-80-87373-15-6
- Čeští skeptikové (Czech Skeptics – who they are and what they want), V. Nosková, 2015, ISBN 978-8087373644
