= Alvin Tobias Hert =

American politician (1865–1921)

Alvin Hert
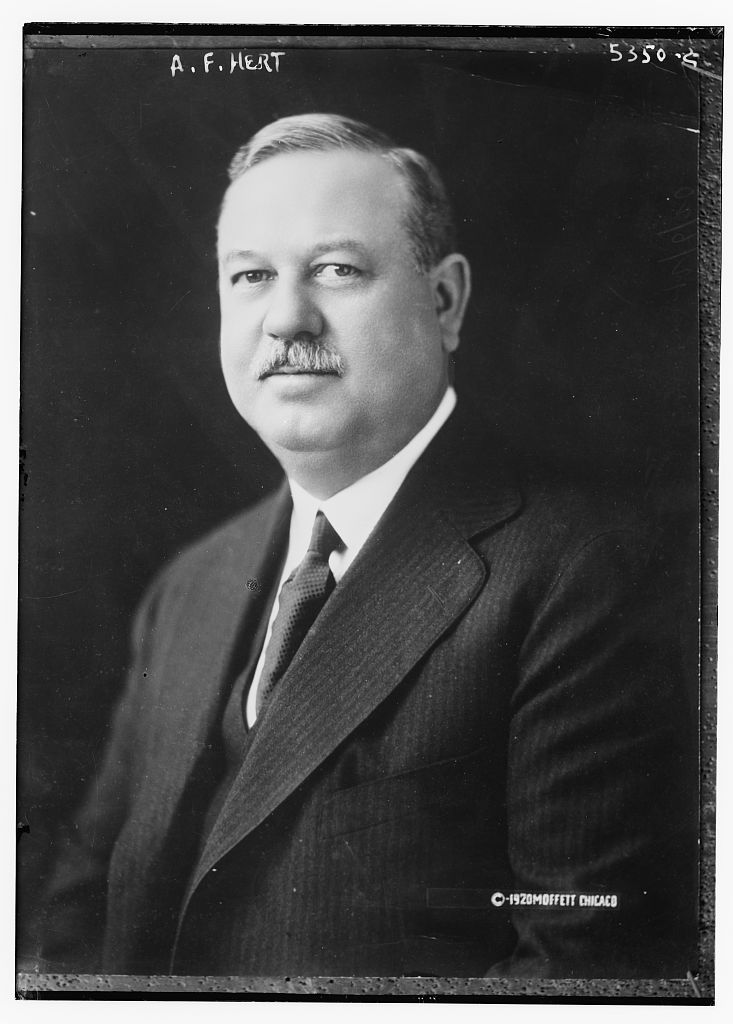

Personal details
- Born: Alvin Tobias Hert; April 8, 1865 Owensburg, Indiana, U.S.
- Died: June 7, 1921 (aged 56) Washington, D.C., U.S.
- Resting place: Cave Hill Cemetery
- Party: Republican
- Spouse: Sallie Aley (m. 1893)

Alvin Tobias Hert (April 8, 1865 – June 7, 1921) was the mayor of Brazil, Indiana, in 1895. He was the warden of the Indiana Reformatory in Jeffersonville, Indiana, in 1902. In 1902 he was named president of the American Creosoting Company. He was a committeeman representing Kentucky at the 1916 Republican National Convention.

== Biography ==
He was born on April 8, 1865, in Owensburg, Indiana, to William Hert and Isabel Owen.

On November 20, 1893, he married Sallie Aley (1863–1948). He became the mayor of Brazil, Indiana, in 1895.

He was the warden of the Indiana Reformatory in Jeffersonville, Indiana, in 1902. He then moved to Louisville, Kentucky, where he became president of the American Creosoting Company.

He died on June 7, 1921, in Washington, D.C. He was buried in Cave Hill Cemetery in Louisville, Kentucky.

== Memberships ==
Pendennis Club of Louisville, Kentucky, Audubon Club of Louisville, Kentucky Club and River Valley Club of Louisville, Kentucky; Union League Club of Chicago, and Columbia Club of Indianapolis, Indiana. He was a Knight Templar Mason.
