= Tereza Nosková =

Czech luger (born 1997)

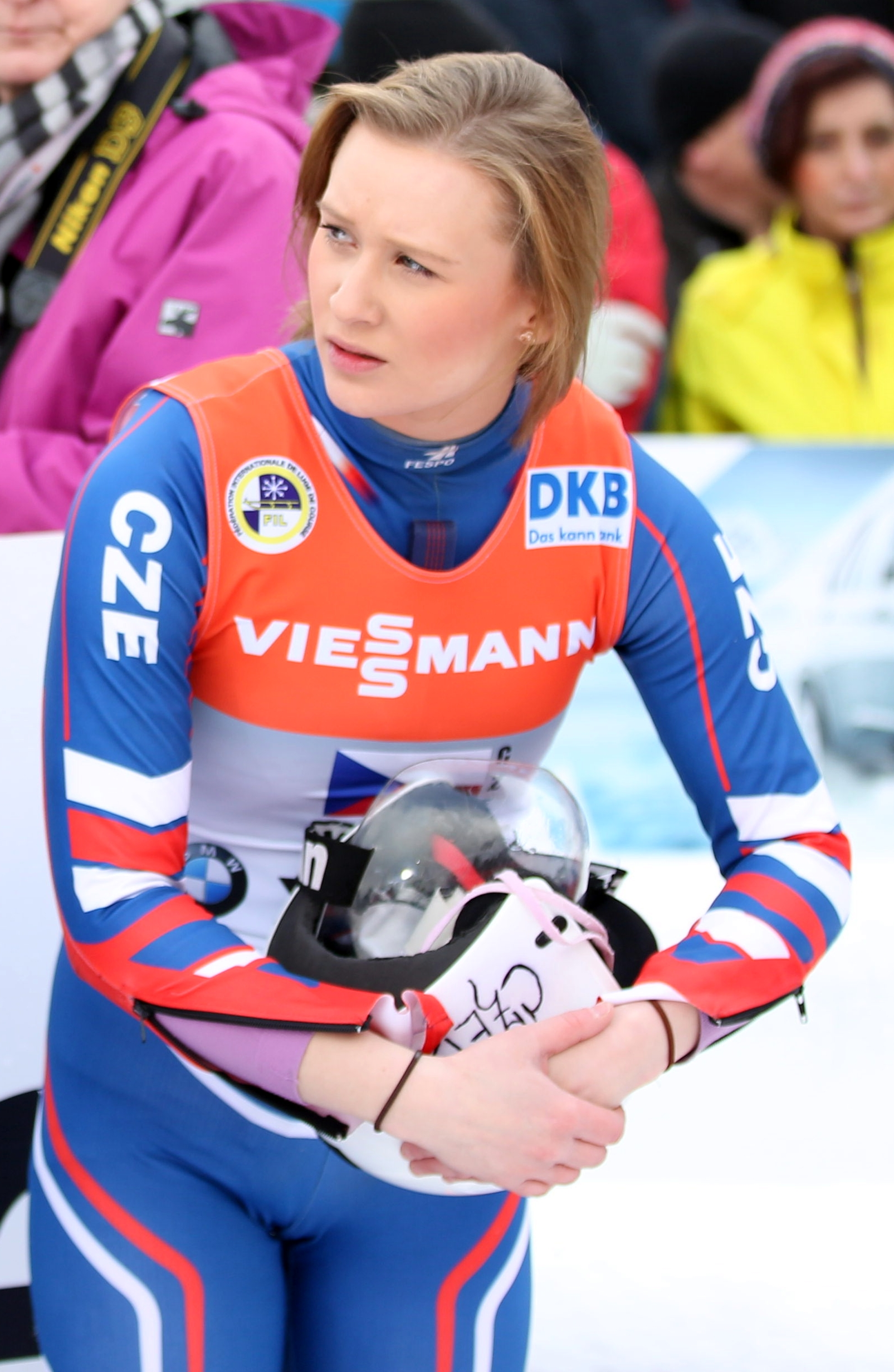
- Nosková in 2017

Personal information
- Nationality: Czech
- Born: 3 April 1997 (age 28); Jablonec nad Nisou, Czech Republic

Sport
- Sport: Luge

Tereza Nosková (born 3 April 1997) is a Czech luger. She competed in the women's singles event at the 2018 Winter Olympics.
