= Michaela Nosková =

- Also known as: Michaela Kolman
- Born: 21 February 1983 (age 43); Brno, Czechoslovakia (now Czech Republic)
- Occupations: Singer, Ombudswoman
- Instrument: Vocals

Michaela Nosková (born 21 February 1983 in Brno) is a Czech singer. She was the runner-up on television contest Česko hledá SuperStar (the Czech version of Pop Idol) in 2005. Her placing in that competition launched her career as a pop singer, recording artist and musical theater star in the Czech Republic. Since 2026, she has served as an ombudswoman at the Czech Ministry of Labour and Social Affairs.

She is a soloist in Prague's historic Karlin theatre performing lead roles in various musicals such as Jekyll & Hyde, The Producers and the operetta Czardasz Princess. She was also featured in Les Misérables at the Goja Music Hall in Prague.

== Personal data ==
Michaela was born on 21 February 1983 in Brno, Czech Republic.

== Discography ==
Albums

- Česko hledá SuperStar Top 12 (June 2005)
- Bez Milosti (October 2005)
- 1983 (May 2008)

DVDs

- Nekdo Se Dívá (October 2005)

Book's

- Já jsem já (October 2005)
