= Vesmír =

Czech magazine (1871–)

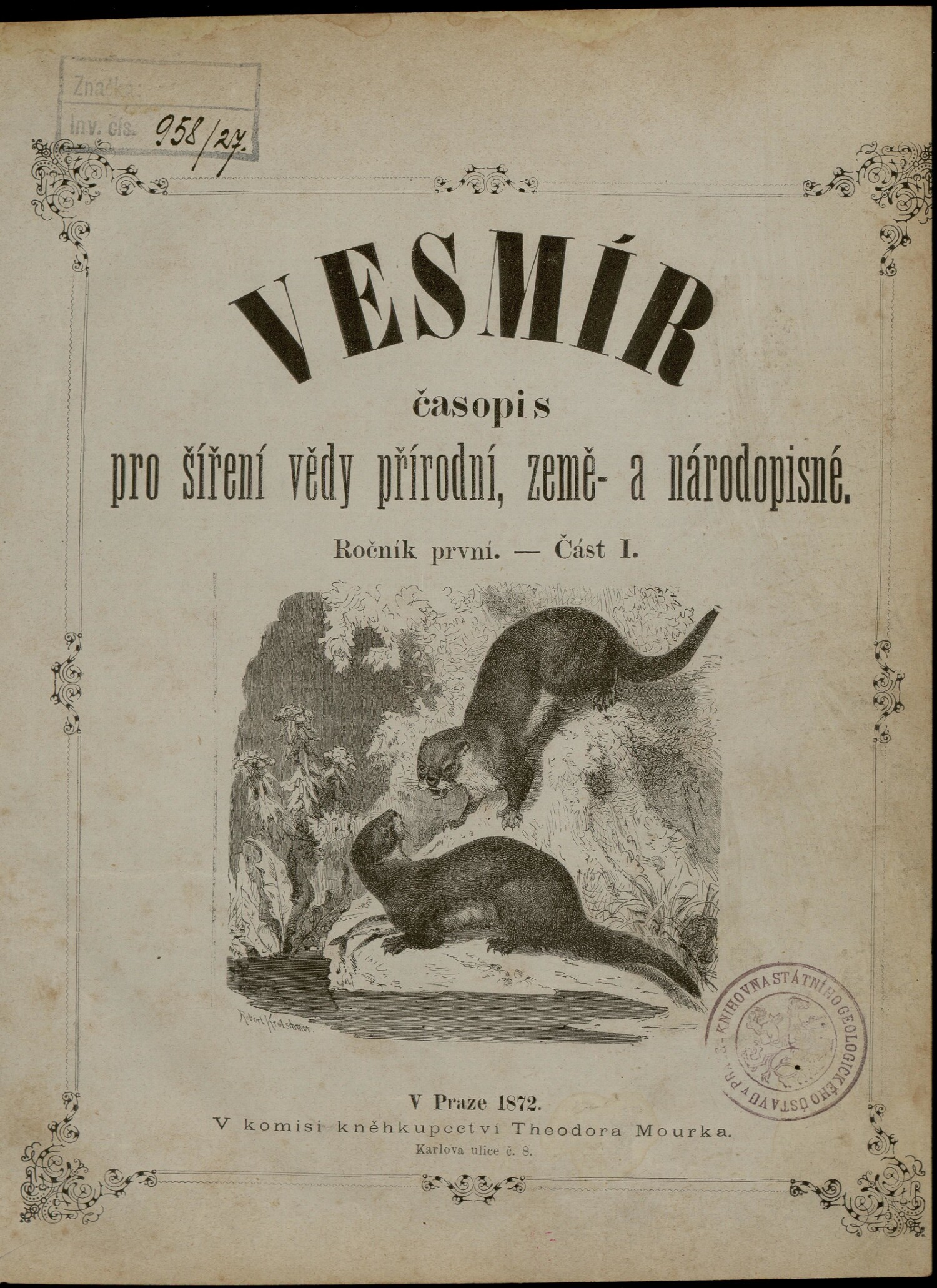
First issue of Vesmír

Vesmír is a Czech monthly popular science magazine. It covers primarily the natural sciences, with overlap into other fields, and publishes articles by scientists that are edited to be accessible to non-specialist readers.

Founded in 1871 it's one of the longest-running Czech periodicals devoted to the popularization of science.

Since 1994, the magazine has been published by Vesmír, s.r.o.

== History ==
Vesmír was founded in 1871 by medical student Václav F. Kumpošt, with the first issue appearing on 3 May that year. Kumpošt initially edited and published the magazine himself, but zoologist Antonín Frič took over as publisher in 1872.

After publication ceased in 1907, Vesmír was revived in 1923 at the initiative of politician Alois Rašín, with botanist Bohumil Němec, a former rector of Charles University, as its publisher. Otakar Matoušek later took over its leadership, and the magazine continued to be published during the Second World War.

During the second half of the 20th century, Vesmír was published by institutions of the Czechoslovak Academy of Sciences, including the Academia publishing house. In 1990, Ivan M. Havel became editor-in-chief and broadened the magazine's coverage to fields that had previously received less attention. A separate Vesmír publishing company was established in the early 1990s and has published the magazine since 1994.

== Content and editorial approach ==
Vesmír primarily covers the natural sciences, while also addressing topics that overlap with other academic disciplines and society. Most of its articles are written by researchers from Czech and foreign universities and are edited to be accessible to readers without specialist knowledge.

The magazine is published monthly in print, alongside continuously updated online content.
