= Tami Hert =

American R&B singer

Tami Hert is an American R&B singer, who was signed to Epic Records in the 1990s. Her debut single "If You Were Mine" was released in 1998, and charted on the US Billboard R&B chart.

She also appeared on Soul Train.
