= Petra Nosková =

Czech biathlete (born 1967)

Personal information
- Nationality: Czech
- Born: 31 October 1967 (age 57); Nové Město na Moravě, Czechoslovakia

Sport
- Sport: Biathlon

Petra Nosková (born 31 October 1967) is a Czech biathlete. She competed in the women's individual event at the 1992 Winter Olympics.
