= Vanek =

Vaněk (Vanek, Vaňková, Vankova, and Wanek)
Origin
- Languages: Czech, Slovak, Polish
- Meaning: diminutive form of Czech: Václav
- Region of origin: Czech Republic, Slovakia, Austria; Poland (Waniek)

Other names
- Variant forms: Wanka, Wanke, Wank; Wenzel, Wentzel, Więcław, Wacław, Wenzeslaus (Wenceslaus), Wenz

Vaněk (feminine Vaňková) is a Czech language surname that is a diminutive of the name Václav or Veceslav, which means "greater glory", from the Old Slavic elements viece "greater" and slav "glory". Alternative spellings of the name include Vaněk, Vaňková, Vankova, Waniek and Wanek. The name may refer to:

- Chase Wright Vanek (born 1996), American actor
- Danuta Waniek (born 1946), Polish politician and academic teacher
- Connie Wanek (born 1952), American poet
- František Vaněk (1931–2020), Czech ice hockey player
- Henryk Waniek (born 1942), Polish artist, stage-set designer
- Herbert Waniek (1897–1949), Austrian stage actor, theatrical producer and impresario
- Jan Vaněk (born 1979), Czech athlete
- Jaroslav Vanek (1930–2017), American economist
- Jean-Pierre Vanek (born 1969), Luxembourgian footballer
- Jiří Vaněk (tennis) (born 1978), Czech tennis player
- Joe Vaněk (born 1948), British opera designer and director
- Karel Vaněk (1895–1958), Czech chess master
- Kateřina Vaňková (born 1989), Czech tennis player
- Ludmila Vaňková, Czech writer
- Margit Vanek (born 1986), Hungarian athlete
- Marilyn Nelson Waniek (born 1946), American poet and translator
- Miroslav Wanek (born 1962), Czech writer
- Ollie Vanek (1908–2000), American baseball player and manager
- Ondřej Vaněk (born 1990), Czech footballer
- Richard Vaněk (born 1991), Czech footballer
- Ronald G. Wanek (born 1941), American businessman
- Šárka Vaňková (born 1987), Czech singer
- Thomas Vanek (born 1984), Austrian ice hockey player
- Todd R. Wanek (born 1963), American businessman
- Zdeněk Vaněk (born 1968), Czech handball player

== Fictional characters ==
- Ferdinand Vaněk, fictional character in the works of Václav Havel and other
- Quartermaster Sergeant-Major Vaněk from The Good Soldier Švejk

== See also ==
- Vanek (disambiguation)
