= Bialystok District =

Administrative unit of Germany (1941–1945)

Bialystok District Bezirk Bialystok
- Bezirk of Nazi Germany
- 1941–1945
- Flag

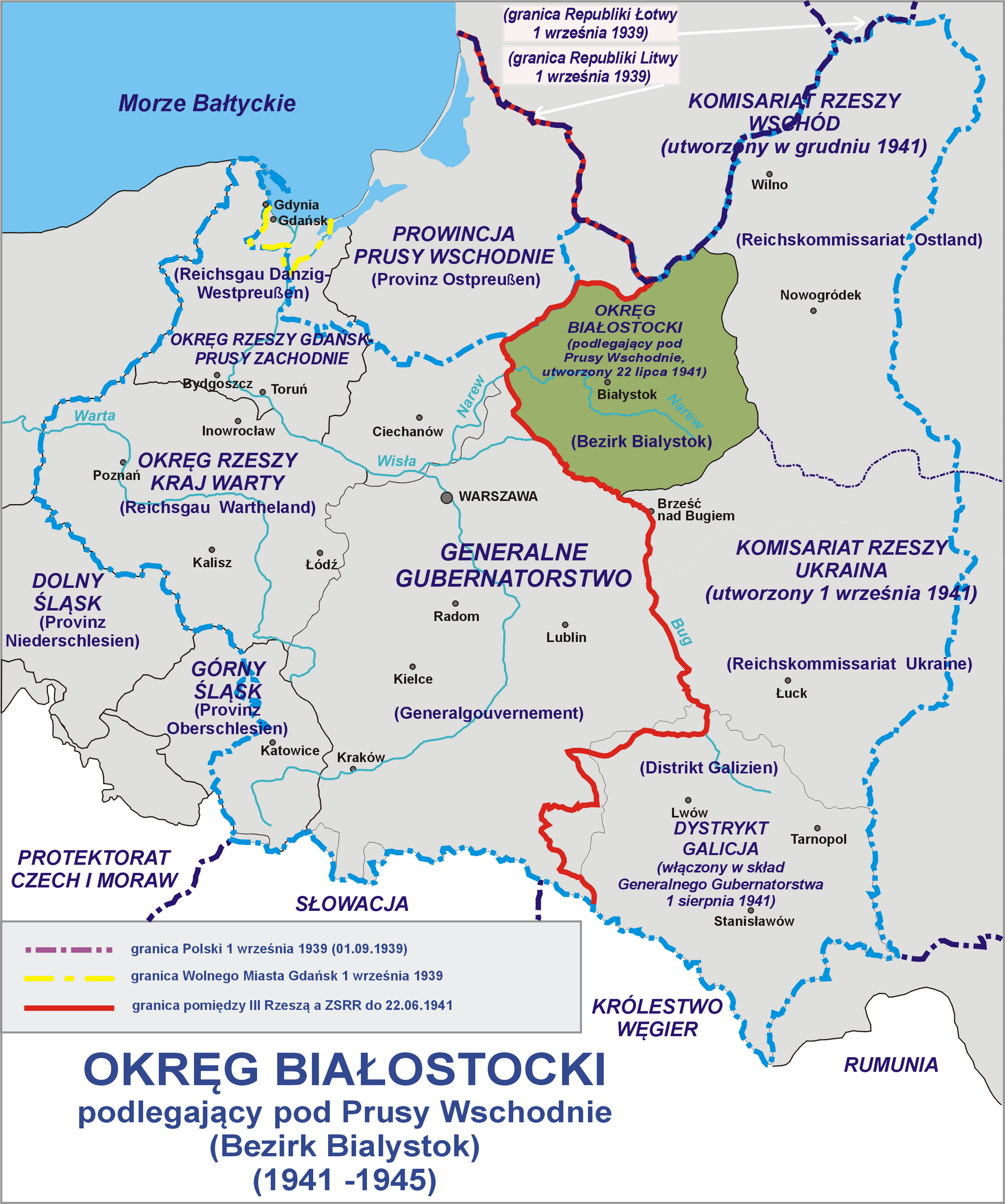
- Bialystok District in 1942
- Capital: Bialystok
- Area
  - Coordinates: 53°08′N 23°09′E
- History
  - Established: 1 August 1941
  - Disestablished: 8 May 1945
- Political subdivisions: 8 Kreise
- Today part of: Poland; Belarus; Lithuania

Bialystok District (German: Bezirk Bialystok) was an administrative unit of Nazi Germany created during the World War II invasion of the Soviet Union. It was to the south-east of East Prussia, in present-day northeastern Poland as well as in smaller sections of adjacent present-day Belarus and Lithuania. It was sometimes also referred to by the designation South East Prussia (German: Südostpreußen) along with the Regierungsbezirk Zichenau, although in contrast to the latter, it was not incorporated into, but merely attached to East Prussia.

The territory lay to the east of the Molotov–Ribbentrop line and was consequently occupied by the Soviet Union and incorporated into the Byelorussian Soviet Socialist Republic. In the aftermath of the German attack on the Soviet Union in June 1941, the westernmost portion of Soviet Belarus (which, until 1939, belonged to the Polish state), was placed under the German Civilian Administration (Zivilverwaltungsgebiet). As Bialystok District, the area was under German rule from 1941 to 1944 without ever formally being incorporated into the German Reich.

The district was established because of its perceived military importance as a bridgehead on the far bank of the Neman. Germany had desired to annex the area even during the First World War, based on the historical claim arising from the Third Partition of Poland, which had delegated Białystok to Prussia from 1795 to 1806 (see New East Prussia). In contrast to other territories of Eastern Poland which were permanently annexed by the Soviet Union following the Second World War, most of the territory was later returned to Poland.

== History ==
Map of Nazi Germany dated March 1944 which includes Bialystok District (top-right, light blue)

=== Administration ===
After the start of Operation Barbarossa against the Soviet Union in June 1941, the invading Wehrmacht soldiers murdered 379 people, 'pacified' 30 villages, burned down 640 houses and 1,385 industrial buildings in the area. Police Battalion 309 burned about 2000 Jews in Great Synagogue, Białystok on 27 June 1941.

The first decree for the implementation of civil administration in these newly occupied territories was issued on 17 July 1941. It was announced that the Bialystok district would implement civil administration at a time to be determined.

On 22 July, Hitler announced that from 1 August, Erich Koch would take over the Bialystok district and demarcate the borders of the district. The borders of this area ran from the southeastern protrusion of East Prussia (the Suwalki triangle) following the Neman River up to Mosty (excluding Grodno), including Volkovysk and Pruzhany up to the Bug River to the west of Brest-Litovsk and then following the border of the General Government to East Prussia.

Bialystok District was established on 1 August 1941. It was simultaneously excluded from the operational zones of the German Army in the Soviet Union. At the same time, some small areas to the east of the 1939–1941 German-Soviet border were incorporated into the East Prussian district of Scharfenwiese (now Ostrołęka). With this the city of Scharfenwiese henceforth held more hinterland to the east.

On 1 August, Erich Koch took over the Białystok district and subsequently, on 15 August, he was appointed as Chief of Civil Administration (Chef der Zivilverwaltung) of Bialystok District. During this period, he also was the Gauleiter of the Gau East Prussia, Oberpräsident of the Prussian Province of East Prussia, and Reichskommissar in Reichskommissariat Ukraine. Day-to-day activities were handled by his permanent deputy head of the Nazi Party in Königsberg, East Prussia, Waldemar Magunia from 15 August 1941 to 31 January 1942. He was replaced from 1 February 1942 to 27 July 1944 by Friedrich Brix, Landrat (District Mayor) of Tilsit.

In addition, SS and security forces were under the direct command of the SS and Police Leader (SSPF) of the District. This officer commanded all SS personnel and police in his jurisdiction, including the Ordnungspolizei (Orpo; regular uniformed police), the SD (intelligence service) and the SiPo (security police), which included the Gestapo (secret police). The commanders were SS-Standartenführer Werner Fromm (January 1942 – January 1943), SS-Brigadeführer Otto Hellwig (May 1943 – July 1944) and SS-Oberführer Heinz Roch (July – October 1944). The SSPF reported to the Higher SS and Police Leader (HSSPF) of Russland Mitte (Central Russia) headquartered in Mogilev until July 1943 and thereafter in Minsk. This was SS-Obergruppenführer Erich von dem Bach-Zelewski (May 1941 – June 1944) and then SS-Obergruppenführer Curt von Gottberg (June – August 1944).

The center of administration for the district was the Polish city of Białystok. The area had a population of 1,383,000 inhabitants, which included 980,000 (70.9%) ethnic Poles, 200,000 (14.5%) Belarusians, 120,000 (8.7%) Jews, 80,000 (5.8%) Ukrainians, and 2,000 (0.1%) ethnic Germans.

Shortly after the front passed, engineer Czesław Chaniawko (delegated by the Belarusian pro-German circles) arrived from Warsaw to Białystok, who led to the establishment of the Belarusian National Committee. The next chairman of the committee was Teodor Ilyashevich, who later also headed the Belarusian Union (established in the first half of 1943 from the transformation of the Belarusian Committee). The committee mainly focused on Belarusian intelligentsia, and a significant part of the Orthodox clergy cooperated with it. He undertook intensive propaganda activities and in the fields of education and culture, and at the end of March 1942 he published the weekly Nowaya Daroga (Belarusian: Новая дарога)). Belarusian activists also took on a number of functions in the strictly subordinated to German administrative authorities, including becoming mayors in Białystok (Wasyl Łukaszyk), Bielsk Podlaski (Jarosław Kostycewicz) and Narewka (Piotr Kabac).

=== Nazi repressions ===
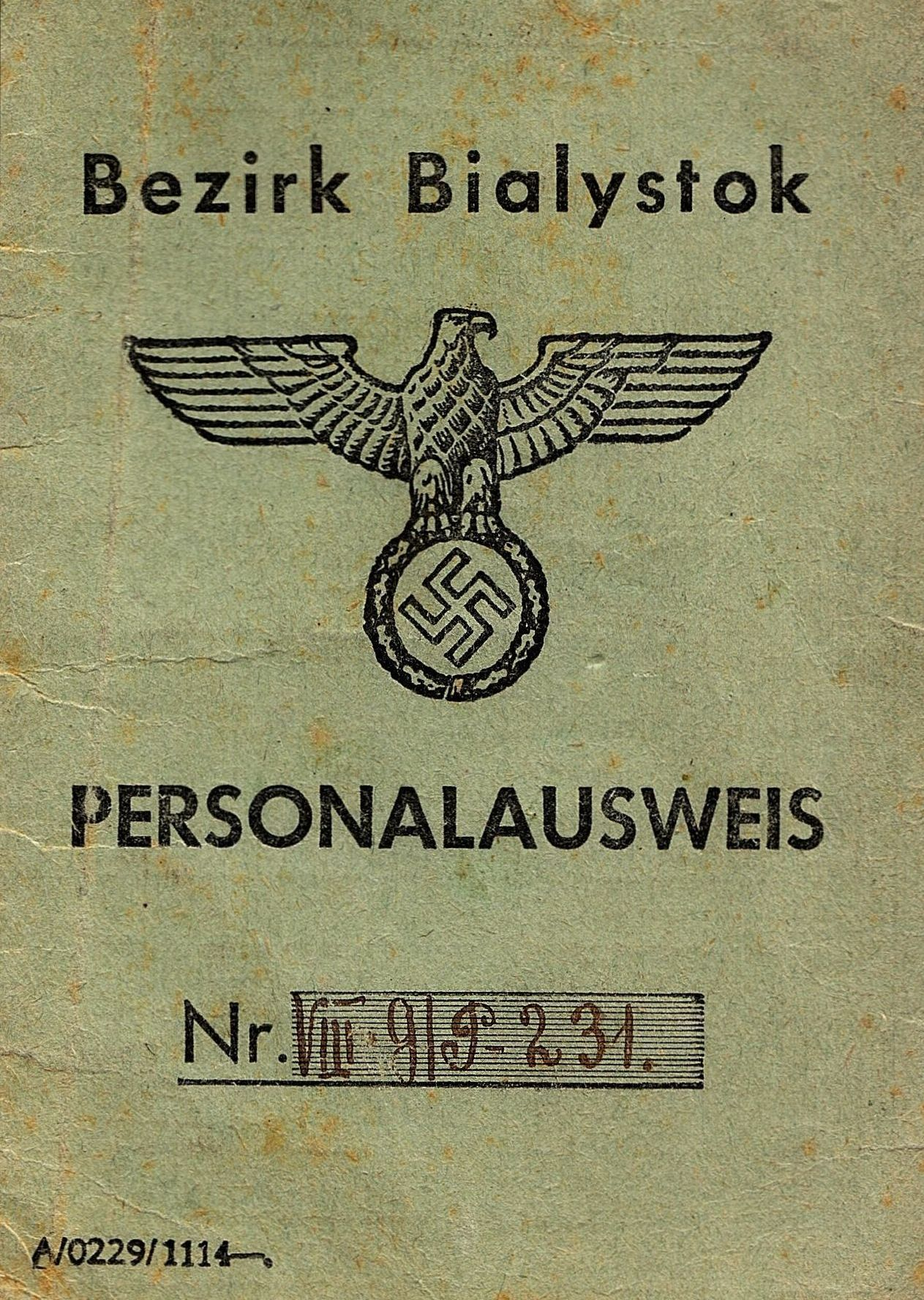
Identity document of Bialystok District (1943)

Until the end of July 1941, the city of Białystok was under controlled by Wehrmacht, it was then subordinated to the civil administration. Shortly before the handover, General Max von Schenckendorff, commander of Army Group Centre Rear Area ordered the Order Police battalions, which were part of Police Regiment Centre, to embark on pacification operations against civilians in the Białystok district. On 25 July 1941, police units commanded by Colonel Max Montua forced 183 families from the villages of Budy, Pogorzelce, and Teremiski in the Białowieża Forest. They were forcibly moved to Pruzhany. The next day, they drove 1,240 people out of the villages around Narewka. In the following days, further populations from the towns of Leśna, Mikłaszew, Olchówka and Zabrod were made to leave. Another 1133 people were displaced to the vicinity of Zabłudów. The brutal Police Battalion 322 burned 12 Polish and Belarusian villages, shot 42 people in the Lacka Forest near Waniek and more in the Osuszek forest near the village of Piliki.

Heinrich Himmler visited the newly formed Bialystok District on 30 June 1941 and pronounced that more forces were needed in the area, due to potential risks of partisan warfare. The chase after the Red Army's rapid retreat left behind a security vacuum, which required the urgent deployment of additional personnel. Scrambling to meet this "new threat", Gestapo headquarters formed Kommando SS Zichenau-Schroettersburg which departed from sub-station Schröttersburg (Płock) under the leadership of SS-Obersturmführer Hermann Schaper (born 1911) with express mission to murder Jews, communists and the NKVD collaborators across the local villages and towns. On 3 July additional formation of Schutzpolizei arrived in Białystok, summoned from the General Government. It was led by SS-Hauptsturmführer Wolfgang Birkner, veteran of Einsatzgruppe IV from the Polish Campaign of 1939. The relief unit, called Kommando Bialystok, was sent in by SS-Obersturmbannfuhrer Eberhard Schöngarth on orders from the Reich Security Main Office (RSHA), due to reports of Soviet guerrilla activity in the area with Jews being of course immediately suspected of helping them out. The first stage of the Nazi persecutions mainly involved applying collective punishment to various villages where any form of real-or-imagined threat had been identified. Terror operations were enacted to prevent assistance to independence movements but mostly to round-up and persecute local Jews. Targeted buildings were being destroyed, possessions robbed, communities mass murdered or sent to labor camps or prisons. SS-Gruppenführer Nebe reported to Berlin on 14 November 1941 that, up to then 45,000 persons had been eliminated.

The situation of the local population did improve after the Raid on Mittenheide. The Germans introduced the policy of finding and forcing anyone who could be of German ancestry, even based on the "pure German looks" in some cases, to accept the German ancestry card (usually 4th category "The Traitors of the German Nation," in spite of the ominous-sounding name, it meant elevation above the rest of the population). The Germans were harkening back to the times of the New East Prussia.

On 1 November 1941, the city of Grodno (location of the Grodno Ghetto set up at the same time) including its surroundings, were transferred from the Reichskommissariat Ostland to Bialystok.

Already on 27 June 1941, a camp for Soviet prisoners of war was established in Bialystok named Stalag 57. On 1 August 1942, it was renamed Stalag 316. It was located in the former barracks of the 10th Lithuanian Uhlan Regiment at 70 Kawaleryjska Street. It was the first one of its kind, except for the makeshift camp that was set up in September 1939 in the building of the Secondary School No. 6. Up to twelve thousand people could stay there at one time. Prisoners were used for construction works at the nearby "Krywlany" airport. Tens of thousands of people passed through the camp, of which approximately 3,000 were killed. After its liquidation in 1943, a transit camp was set up there for the Jewish population. Several other camps were also established: a transitional camp for people taken to forced labor into the Third Reich consisting of 3 barracks, a penal camp in Starosielce located in the triangle between the railway lines Białystok - Ełk and Białystok - Warsaw, and the "Zielona" penal camp located between Zaścianki and the Skorupa district where people were arrested for violating German regulations, such as being late for work or alcohol abuse.

Following the German occupation, most Jews had been rounded up and forced into some 60 ghettos throughout the District. On 2 November 1942 Nazi SS and police forces, in a coordinated operation with help from the local gendarmerie, suddenly encircled and quarantined all the ghettos. Between November 1942 and February 1943, approximately 100,000 Jews in the District, including some 10,000 from Bialystok proper, were sent to the Treblinka and Auschwitz death camps. The final liquidation of the Białystok Ghetto took place in August 1943, when the remaining 30,000 Jews there were sent to be murdered.

=== Resistance ===
The Home Army operated within the Bialystok District. Aside from attacking the occupying forces, it ran intelligence and propaganda networks and collected a V2-rocket, parts of which were transported to London. The National Armed Forces branch was established in the region, with the initiative to establish the NSZ came from the Military Organization Lizard Union. The Lizard Union envoy, 2nd Lt. Feliks Mazurek, pseudonym "Zych", began talks with representatives of the Armed Confederation. As a result of the talks, the National Armed Forces branch was established in the region. Initially, the ranks of this organization included the Białystok ZJ and KZ Districts, as well as small groups from the Eastern Combat Organization, the Defenders of Poland Command, the Union for the Reconstruction of the Republic, and the Home Army.

During the night of 15–16 August 1943, the Białystok Ghetto Uprising began. This was an insurrection in Poland's Białystok Ghetto by several hundred Polish Jews who began an armed struggle against the German troops finishing off the liquidation of the people still living in the Ghetto. This Ghetto's victims were ultimately destined for the Treblinka extermination camp. It was organized and led by Antyfaszystowska Organizacja Bojowa, an organisation that was part of the Anti-Fascist Block, and was the second largest ghetto uprising, after the Warsaw Ghetto Uprising, in Nazi-occupied Poland during World War II.

In July 1943, the Striking Cadre Battalions units, active in Bezirk Bialystok, consisted of five Battalions. Altogether, there were 200 fighters, and during a number of skirmishes with the Germans (including the Raid on Mittenheide in 1943), 138 of them were killed. These heavy losses were criticized by the headquarters of the Home Army, who claimed that the UBK was profusely using lives of young Polish soldiers. On 17 August 1943, upon the order of General Tadeusz Bor-Komorowski, the UBK was included into the Home Army. Soon afterwards, all battalions were transferred to the area of Nowogródek.

On 20 October 1943, the southern border between the East Prussian district Sudauen (Suwałki) in the Province of East Prussia and the Bialystok District was adjusted and moved back to the northern side of the Augustów Canal.

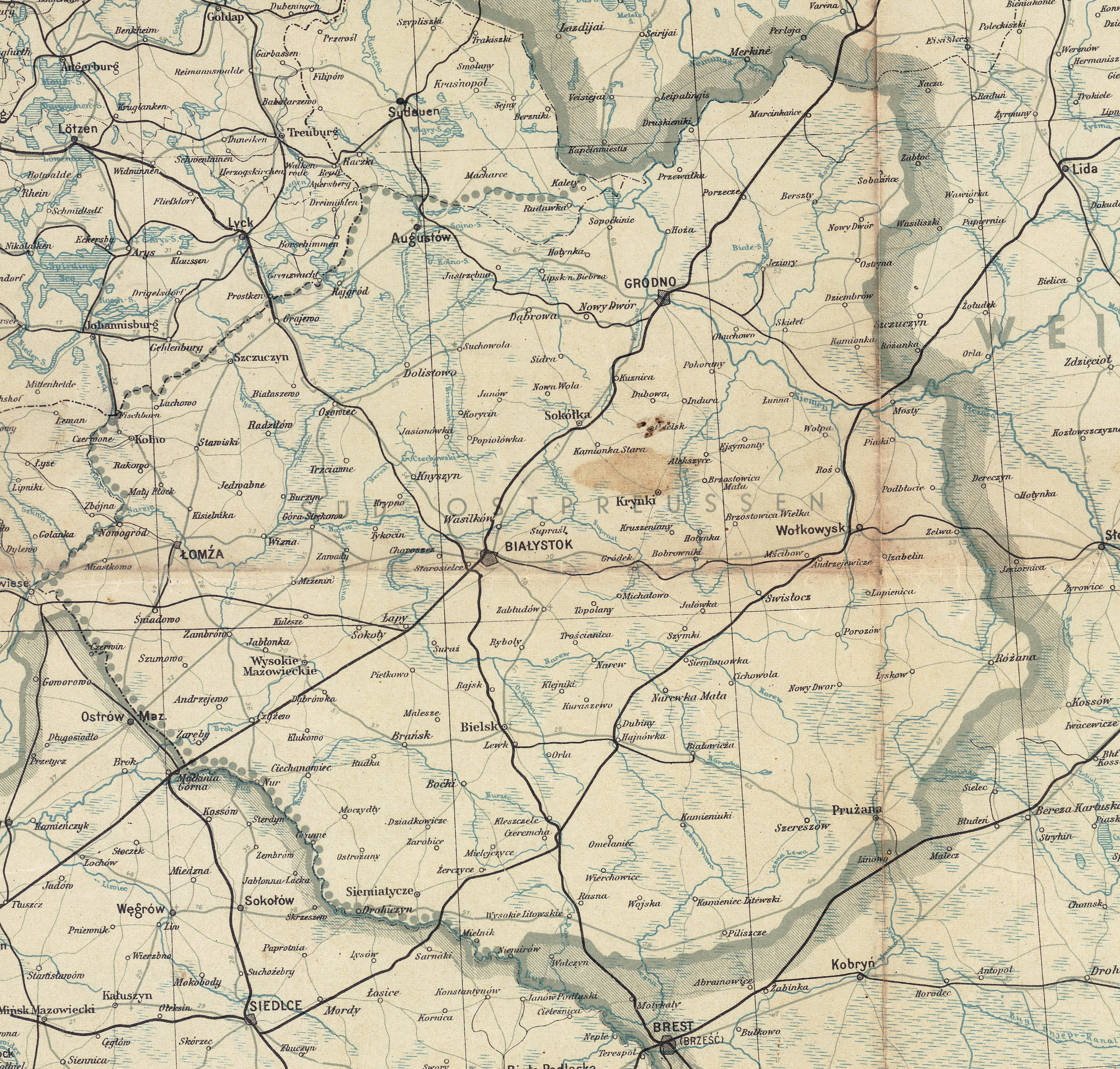
A July 1944 German map of Bialystok District, labelled "South East Prussia"

In preparation for the Operation Tempest, smaller groups in Białystok District also joined the Home Army, but with significant clandestine achievements to their credit, such as the Independent Poland and the Combat Organization "Wschód". After the arrest in April 1943 and subsequent execution in Nowosiółki of W. Praga and Mieczysław Blahuszewski, the activities of the Polish People's Party and the Peasant Battalions ceased. Polish socialists had already dispersed earlier, and in general, in the territories incorporated into the USSR in 1939, no units of the Gwardia Ludowa and the People's Army or the Polish Workers' Party were formed. However, after the severe blows inflicted by the Soviet occupier, the political structures of the nationalists were partially reborn. Initially, the strongest was the National Military Organization, but it was broken up by the NKVD in 1940, so the youth group moved to the Military Organization Lizard Union the following year. In January 1944, the region's Home Army began participating in Operation Tempest launching a series of uprisings throughout Białystok. In July and August 1944, the territory of Bialystok District was taken over by the Red Army up to the Narew-Bobr line. The government seat for the Chief of Civil Administration was then moved to Bartenstein. In January 1945, the Red Army overran the last areas of Bialystok District, namely the remaining parts of the districts Łomża and Grajewo, driving the Germans completely out of the territory.

At the end of May 1944, the Government Delegate for the Białystok Voivodeship, Józef Przybyszewski, a prominent activist of the National Party, arrived in Białystok. The Białystok Voivode settled in the St. Roch rectory with Father Adam Abramowicz, who provided him with all-round assistance. Przybyszewski, wanting to strengthen national influence in the ranks of the Home Army, led to the commencement of talks between representatives of the district commands of NOW and NSZ in 1944. The talks led to the unification of both organizations. The talks were facilitated by the situation in the National Armed Forces. The division into NSZ-ZJ and NSZ-AK also affected the District. Boleslaw Kozlowski ("Grot") and Waclaw Nestorowicz ("Kalina"), opponents of Stanislaw Nakoniecznikow ("Kilinski") sided with NSZ-NOW. The envoy of the NSZ-AK Headquarters established a new district command, appointing Captain Waclaw Nestorowicz as acting commander. Meanwhile, in Białystok, Roman Jastrzebski ("Ślepowron"), supported by supporters of Stanislaw Nakoniecznikow ("Kmicic"), took over as commander. There were therefore two district commands of NSZ. The organizational breakdown and chaos reigning in the ranks of this organization facilitated an agreement between the two national organizations, while at the same time giving the NOW activists an advantage.
