= Huanca (disambiguation) =

The Huanca are a Quechua people of Peru.

Huanca may also refer to:

- Huanca (monolith), a type of sacred stone monument
- Huanca (mountain), in the Peruvian Andes
- Huanca District, in Caylloma Province, Peru
- Huanca language, or Wanka Quechua, a variety of Quechua spoken by the Huanca people
- Huancas District, in Chachapoyas Province, Peru

== See also ==
- Wanka (disambiguation)
