= Nufloors Penticton Curling Classic =

- Established: 2017
- Host city: Penticton, British Columbia
- Arena: Penticton Curling Club
- Purse: $88,000
- 2026 champion: (Sweden) Oskar Eriksson

Current edition
- 2026 Nufloors Penticton Curling Classic

Location in Canada

The Nufloors Penticton Curling Classic is an annual bonspiel on the men's tour. It is held annually in November at the Penticton Curling Club in Penticton, British Columbia. It has been held since 2017. From 2017–2020, the event was sponsored by Ashley HomeStore, a U.S. based furniture retailer. Starting in 2021, the tournament will be sponsored by Nufloors Penticton, a Canadian flooring service.

With a purse of $100,000, it has one of the highest purses on the tour and attracts some of the top curling teams in the world.

== Previous names ==
- 2017–2020: Ashley HomeStore Curling Classic
- 2021–present: Nufloors Penticton Curling Classic

== Past champions ==
Year	Winning team	Runner up team	Purse (CAD)	Winner's share (CAD)
2017	(Alberta) Kevin Koe, Marc Kennedy, Brent Laing, Ben Hebert	(Sweden) Niklas Edin, Oskar Eriksson, Rasmus Wranå, Christoffer Sundgren	$66,000	$18,800
2018	(Scotland) Glen Muirhead, Kyle Smith, Thomas Muirhead, Cammy Smith	(Scotland) Ross Paterson, Kyle Waddell, Duncan Menzies, Michael Goodfellow	$66,000	$19,000
2019	(Alberta) Brendan Bottcher, Darren Moulding, Brad Thiessen, Karrick Martin	(Manitoba) Mike McEwen, Reid Carruthers, Derek Samagalski, Colin Hodgson	$84,000	$20,000
2020	(Manitoba) Mike McEwen, Reid Carruthers, Derek Samagalski, Colin Hodgson	(Ontario) Glenn Howard, Scott Howard, David Mathers, Fraser Reid	$84,000	$18,000
2021	(Sweden) Niklas Edin, Oskar Eriksson, Rasmus Wranå, Christoffer Sundgren	(Ontario) Glenn Howard, Scott Howard, David Mathers, Tim March	$84,000	$18,000
2022	(United States) John Shuster, Chris Plys, Matt Hamilton, John Landsteiner	(Manitoba) Matt Dunstone, B. J. Neufeld, Colton Lott, Ryan Harnden	$100,000	$20,000
2023	(Ontario) Glenn Howard, (Note: Glenn Howard missed the playoffs and one preliminary game due to injury.) Scott Howard, David Mathers, Tim March	(United States) Chris Plys, Matt Hamilton, Colin Hufman, John Landsteiner	$100,000	$20,000
2024	(Alberta) Brad Jacobs, Marc Kennedy, Brett Gallant, Ben Hebert	(Ontario) Scott Howard, Mat Camm, Jason Camm, Tim March	$100,000	$20,000
2025	(Manitoba) B. J. Neufeld, Catlin Schneider, Kyle Doering, Connor Njegovan	(Alberta) Evan van Amsterdam, Jeremy Harty, Jason Ginter, Parker Konschuh	$100,000	$20,000
2026	(Sweden) Oskar Eriksson, Rasmus Wranå, Simon Olofsson, Christoffer Sundgren	(Switzerland) Philipp Hösli (Fourth), Marco Hösli (Skip), Simon Gloor, Justin Hausherr	$88,000	$23,000
