= Wank (surname) =

Wank is a surname, and may refer to:

- Andreas Wank (born 1988), German ski jumper
- Lukas Wank (born 1997), German basketball player
- Roland Wank (1898–1970), Hungarian architect
- Alex Wank (born 1967), Austrian musician, former member of Pungent Stench

== See also ==
- Wanka (disambiguation)
- Wanké
- Wänke
- Wanker (surname)
- Wank (disambiguation)
