= Ashley HomeStore =

American furniture store chain

Ashley Home Stores Ltd.
- Logo used since 2022

- Ashley Furniture HomeStore in Glorietta, Makati, Philippines
- Trade name: Ashley
- Formerly: Ashley Furniture HomeStore (1997–2016); Ashley HomeStore (2016–2022)
- Type: Subsidiary
- Industry: Furnishings, Franchising
- Founded: 1997; 29 years ago Anchorage, Alaska, U.S.
- Headquarters: Arcadia, Wisconsin, U.S.,
- Number of locations: 2,000 (2021)
- Key people: Ronald G. Wanek, Founder; Todd R. Wanek, CEO
- Products: Upholstered furniture and casegoods
- Revenue: 5 billion US$
- Number of employees: 4,000
- Parent: Ashley Furniture Industries (1997–present)
- Website: www.ashleyfurniture.com ashleyhomestore.ca

Ashley Home Stores Ltd. (doing business as Ashley and still known as Ashley Furniture HomeStore in some countries) is an American furniture store chain that sells Ashley Furniture products. Opened in 1997, the chain comprises over 2,000 locations worldwide. The chain has both corporate and independently licensed and operated furniture stores.

== History ==
The first Ashley Furniture HomeStore opened in Anchorage, Alaska in 1997. Since then, the company has become the #1 home furniture retailer in North America. It has stores located throughout the United States, Canada, Morocco, Chile, Mexico, Puerto Rico, Egypt, Central America, Japan, India, Turkey, Singapore, Saudi Arabia, Pakistan, Kazakhstan, Armenia, Georgia, Ukraine, Mongolia, Kuwait, Cambodia, Vietnam and Bangladesh.

The 100th HomeStore store opened in 2003, the 200th in 2005. It became the fastest-growing furniture chain and top-selling furniture brand worldwide in 2006 and opened its 300th store in 2007.

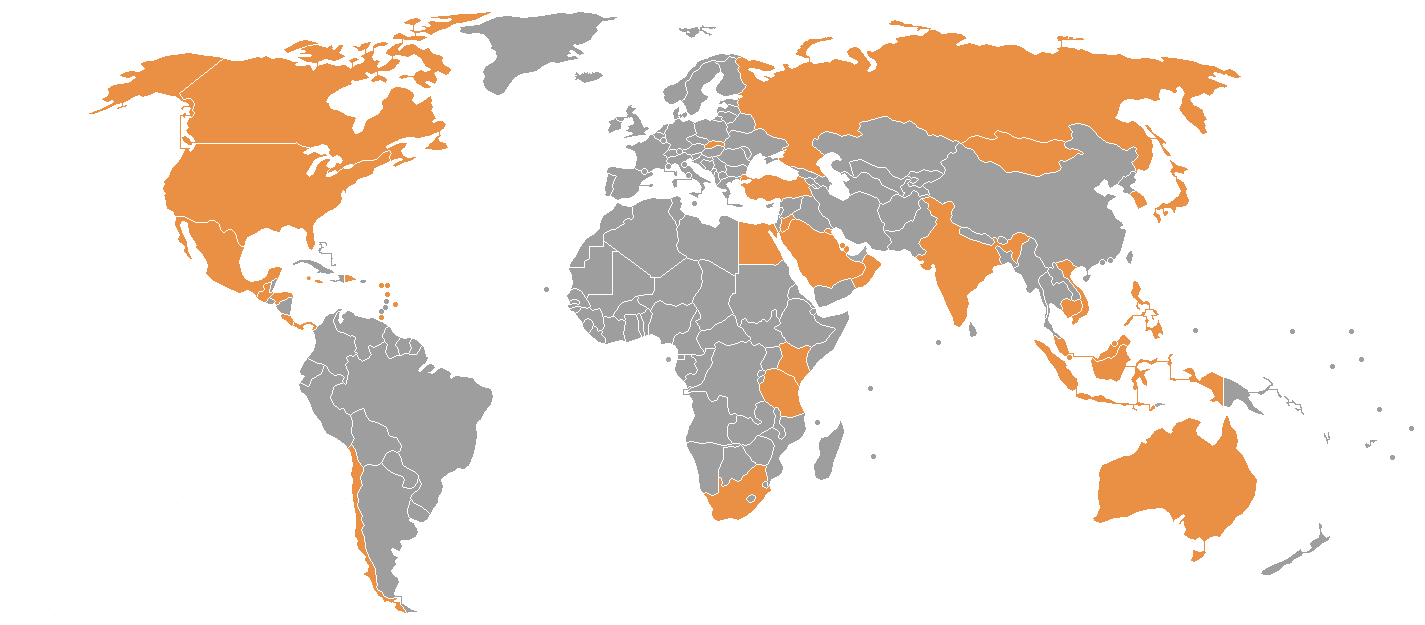
Map of countries with Ashley Homestores

At the time when Jennifer Convertibles filed for Chapter 11 bankruptcy protection in July 2010, Ashley Furniture HomeStore was listed as having a $1.4 million claim against Jennifer. When Jennifer emerged from bankruptcy in February 2011, it controlled six Ashley Furniture HomeStores in the New York City area.

In February 2014, Ashley Furniture HomeStore opened its 500th store in Longview, Texas. As of 2022 there are over 1000 Ashley HomeStore locations across the globe.

In April 2015, Ashley Furniture HomeStore made its first incursion in South America by opening its first store in Punta Arenas, Chile.

== Ashley Furniture Industries ==
The parent company of Ashley, Ashley Furniture Industries, headquartered in Arcadia, Wisconsin, is the world's largest home furniture manufacturer. Owned by father and son team, Ron and Todd R. Wanek, the company manufactures and distributes home furnishings throughout the globe. The company employs more than 18,000. In 2013, the company built a 3.8 million square foot manufacturing and distribution complex in Advance, North Carolina.

== Charity ==
Ashley HomeStore has raised over $6 million for St. Jude Children's Research Hospital. The company hosts the annual Ashley For The Arts, whose proceeds go towards children's charities, school and other different humanitarian initiatives. Most Ashley HomeStore locations also support the Hope to Dream foundation which donates mattresses to kids aged 6-16 that do not have one.
