= Řevnice =

- Town
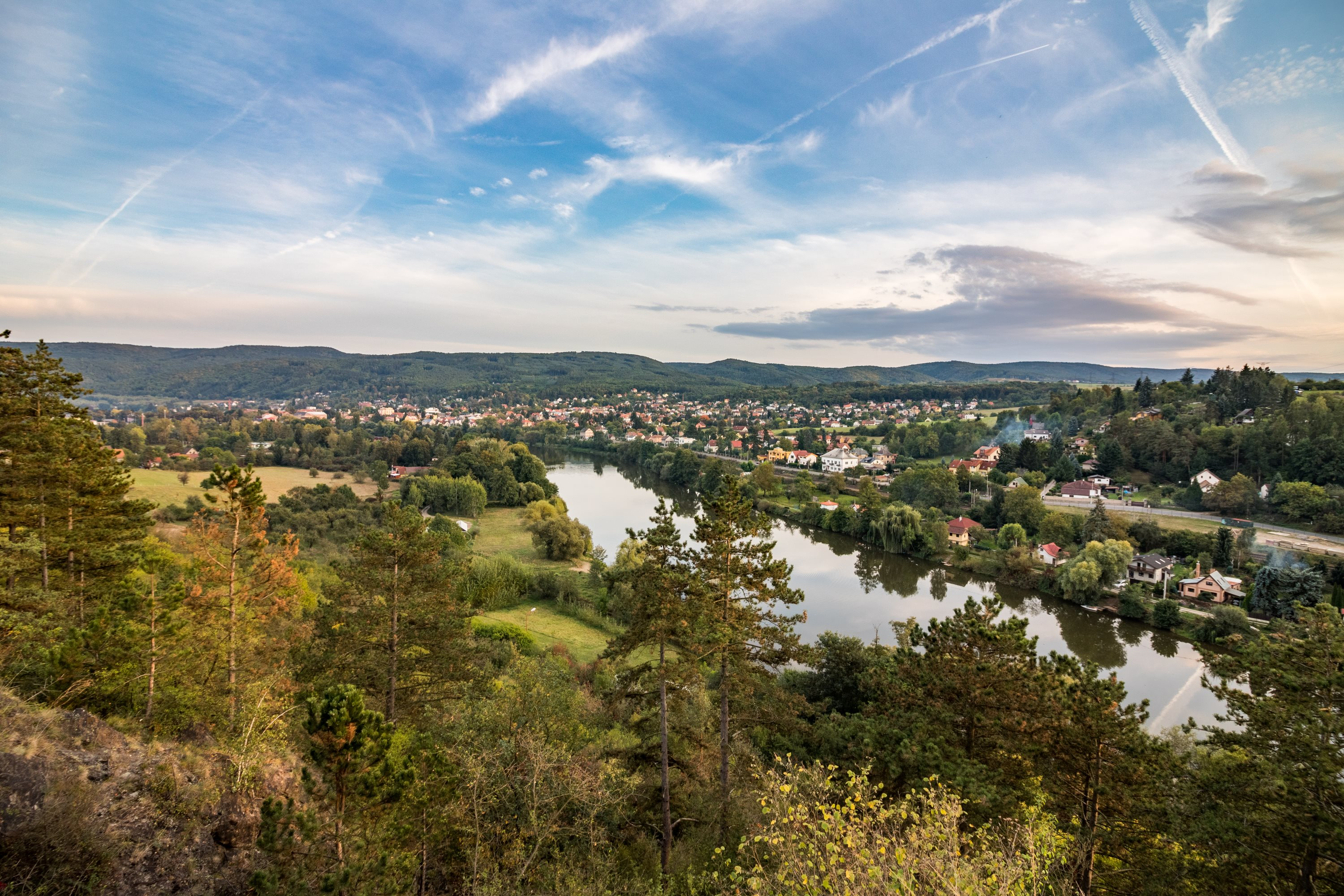
- General view of Řevnice

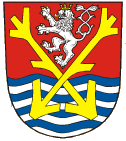
- Flag Coat of arms

- Location in the Czech Republic
- Coordinates: 49°54′50″N 14°14′9″E
- Country: Czech Republic
- Region: Central Bohemian
- District: Prague-West
- First mentioned: 1253

Government
  - Mayor: Tomáš Smrčka

Area
  - Total: 10.14 km^{2} (3.92 sq mi)
- Elevation: 218 m (715 ft)

Population (2026-01-01)
  - Total: 3,786
  - Density: 373.4/km^{2} (967.0/sq mi)
- Time zone: UTC+1 (CET)
  - Summer (DST): UTC+2 (CEST)
- Postal code: 252 30
- Website: www.revnice.cz

Řevnice (Czech pronunciation: [ˈr̝ɛvɲɪtsɛ]) is a town in Prague-West District in the Central Bohemian Region of the Czech Republic. It has about 3,800 inhabitants. The town is located on the Berounka River, on the border between the Brdy Highlands and Hořovice Uplands. The main landmark of Řevnice is the Church of Saint Maurice.

== Etymology ==
The name is derived from the personal name Řevna, meaning "the village of Řevna's people". The personal name itself was derived from the adjective řevný, meaning 'zealous' or 'ardent' in Old Czech.

== Geography ==
Řevnice is located about 16 kilometres (10 mi) southwest of Prague. Most of the municipal territory lies in the Brdy Highlands, only the northern part lies in the Hořovice Uplands. The highest point is the hill Strážný vrch at 507 m (1,663 ft) above sea level. The town is situated on both banks of the Berounka River.

== History ==
The first written mention of Řevnice is from 1253. At the end of the 19th century, the village was promoted to a market town, and in 1968, Řevnice was promoted to a town.

== Demographics ==
Historical population

Year	Pop.	±%
1869	675	—
1880	741	+9.8%
1890	861	+16.2%
1900	1,085	+26.0%
1910	1,235	+13.8%

Year	Pop.	±%
1921	1,641	+32.9%
1930	2,939	+79.1%
1950	3,111	+5.9%
1961	3,687	+18.5%
1970	3,428	−7.0%

Year	Pop.	±%
1980	3,306	−3.6%
1991	2,966	−10.3%
2001	2,956	−0.3%
2011	3,217	+8.8%
2021	3,734	+16.1%

Source: Censuses

== Transport ==
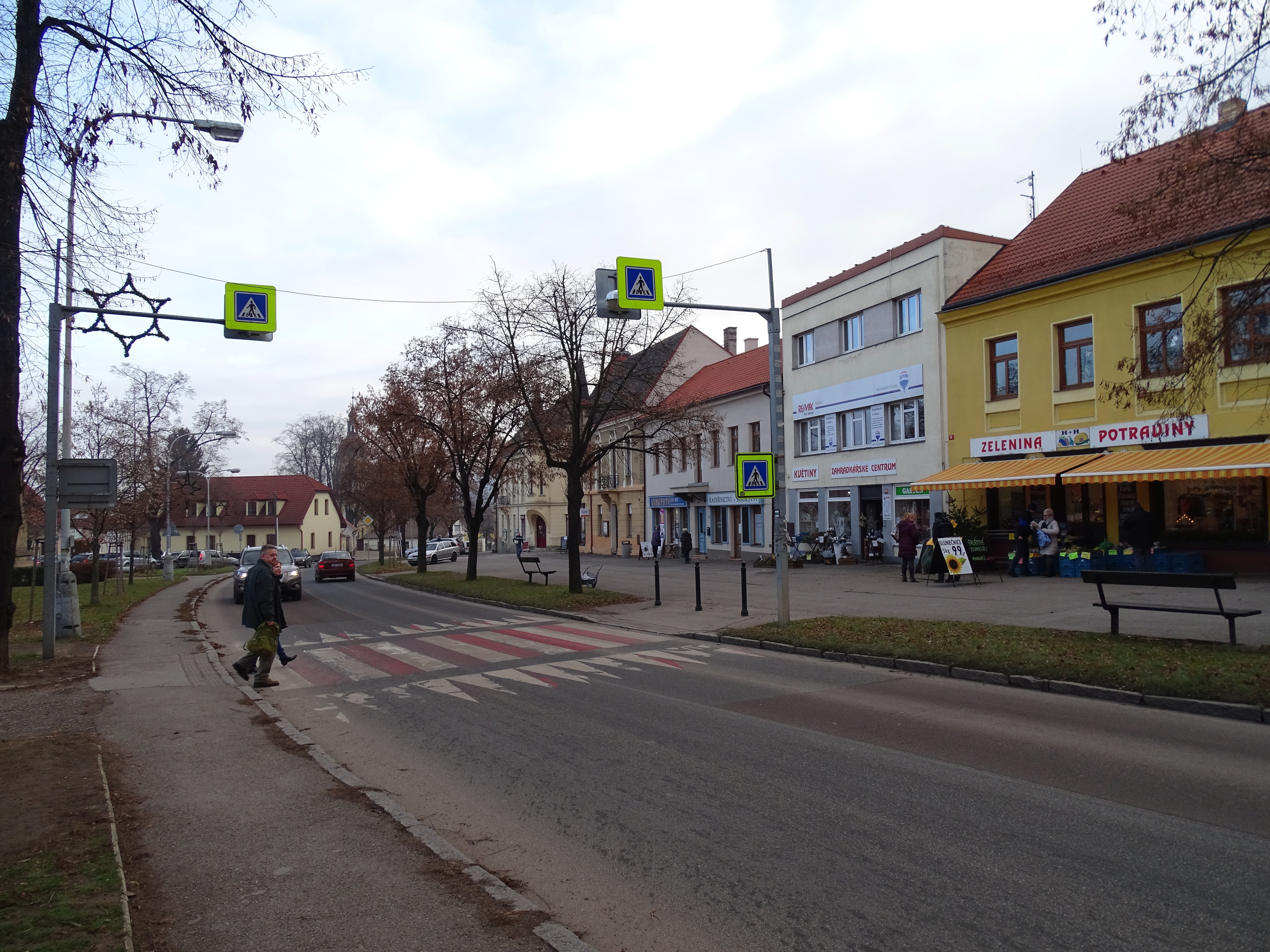
Town square

Řevnice is located on the railway line Prague–Beroun.

== Sights ==
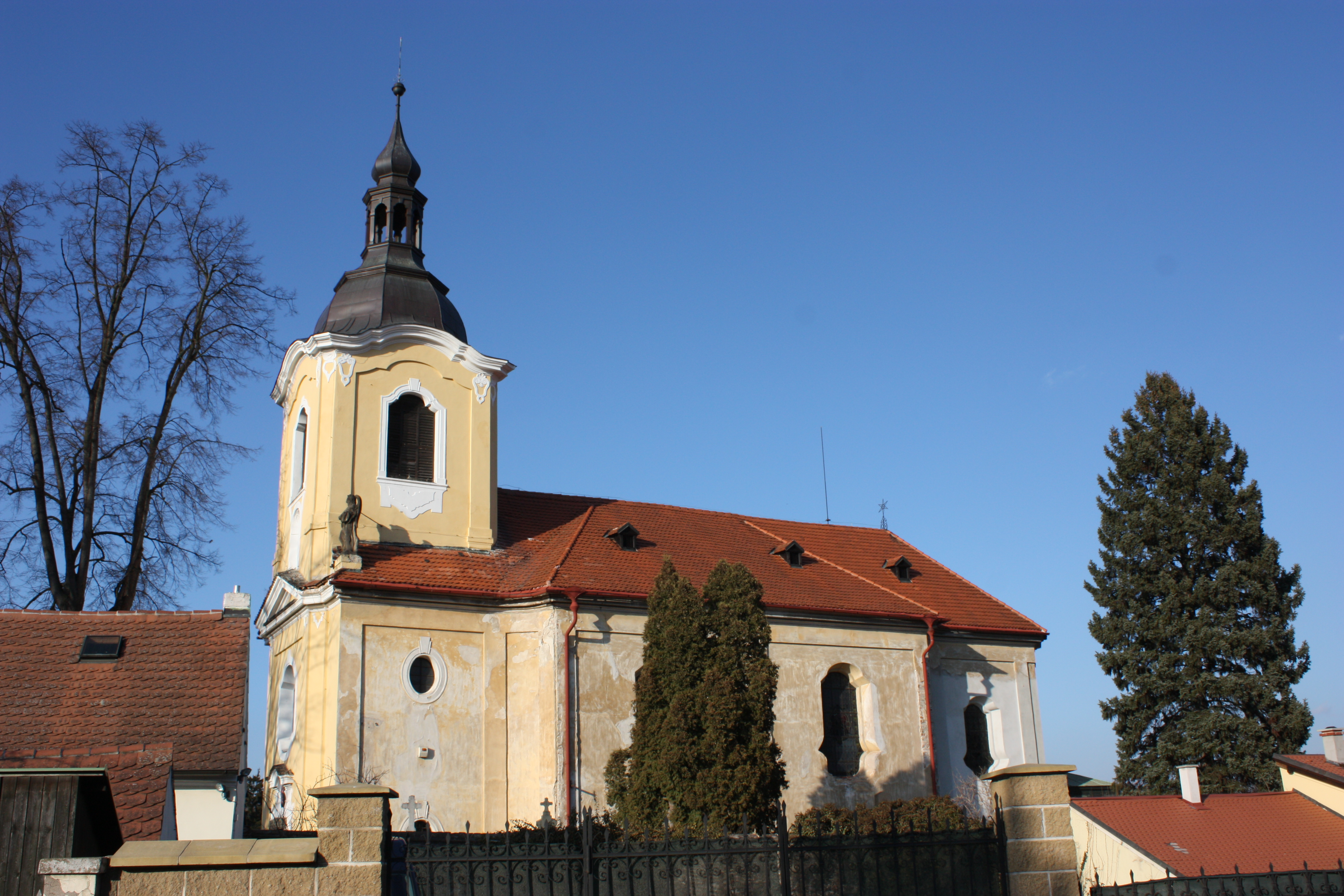
Church of Saint Maurice

The main landmark of Řevnice is the Church of Saint Maurice. There was two churches in the town: Romanesque church of Saint Maurice and Gothic church of the Virgin Mary. In the mid-18th century, both fell into disrepair and were therefore demolished. They were replaced by the current Church of Saint Maurice, built in the Baroque style in 1749–1753.

== Notable people ==
- Ludmila Vaňková (born 1927), writer and local politician
- Martina Navratilova (born 1956), Czech-American tennis player; grew up here
