= Wanker (disambiguation) =

Wanker is a pejorative term.

Wanker may also refer to:

- Wanker (surname)
- Cockney Wanker, a character from the British comic magazine Viz
- Wanker Records, an independent record label
- Wanker County, Wisconsin, the fictional place of origin of Peggy Bundy, née Wanker, in Married ... with Children
- J. Wanker, pseudonym of Jean-Pierre Vaquier

== See also ==
- www.tism.wanker.com, a 1999 album by Australian alternative rock group TISM
- Malakas the Greek equivalent of wanker from the bad meaning
- Wank (disambiguation)
- Wanka (disambiguation)
- Wanké
