= 2026 Nufloors Penticton Curling Classic =

- Host city: Penticton, British Columbia
- Arena: Penticton Curling Club
- Dates: October 8–11
- Winner: (Sweden) Team Eriksson
- Curling club: Karlstads CK, Karlstad
- Skip: Oskar Eriksson
- Third: Rasmus Wranå
- Second: Simon Olofsson
- Lead: Christoffer Sundgren
- Finalist: (Switzerland) Marco Hösli

The 2026 Nufloors Penticton Curling Classic was held from October 8 to 11 at the Penticton Curling Club in Penticton, British Columbia. The event was held in a round robin format with a purse of $88,000.

The event featured many top teams such as Schwaller, Bottcher, Eriksson, Hösli and Koe as it was held the weekend before the 2026 GSOC Invitational Grand Slam event.

== Teams ==
The teams are listed as follows:

| Skip | Third | Second | Lead | Alternate | Locale |
|---|---|---|---|---|---|
| Shinya Abe (Note: Tetsuro Shimizu missed the event. Shinya Abe threw fourth stones while the front end trio of Asei Nakahara, Haruto Ouchi and Hayato Sato played third, second and lead respectively.) | Asei Nakahara | Haruto Ouchi | Hayato Sato | | Sapporo, Japan |
| Cameron de Jong (Fourth) | Matthew Blandford (Skip) | Sébastien Robillard | Cody Johnston | | Vancouver, British Columbia |
| Brendan Bottcher | Jake Horgan | Tanner Horgan | Geoff Walker | | Edmonton, Alberta |
| Cody Claeys | Nathan Silva | Nolan Blaeser | Roy Peters | | Kelowna, British Columbia |
| Jim Cotter | Jared Kolomaya | Connor Deane | Erik Colwell | Brad Wood | Vernon, British Columbia |
| Zach Davies | Ronan Peterson | Will Butler | Lucas Sawiak | | Edmonton, Alberta |
| Oskar Eriksson | Rasmus Wranå | Simon Olofsson | Christoffer Sundgren | | Karlstad, Sweden |
| Matthew Hall | Sterling Middleton | Alex Horvath | Thomas Thierbach | | Victoria, British Columbia |
| Philipp Hösli (Fourth) | Marco Hösli (Skip) | Simon Gloor | Justin Hausherr | | Glarus, Switzerland |
| Jeong Byeong-jin | Kim Hyo-jun | Pyo Jeong-min | Kim Jin-hun | Kim Dae-hyun | Uiseong, South Korea |
| Kevin Koe | Johnson Tao | Aaron Sluchinski | Karrick Martin | | Calgary, Alberta |
| Mitchell Kopytko | Cam Weir | Calder Fadden | Coburn Fadden | | Kamloops, British Columbia |
| Lee Jae-beom | Kim Min-woo | Kim San | Kim Jeong-min | | Seoul, South Korea |
| Jacob Libbus | Nathan Molberg | Zachary Pawliuk | Michael Hendricks | | Edmonton, Alberta |
| Takumi Maeda | Hiroki Maeda | Uryu Kamikawa | Gakuto Tokoro | Ryotaro Shukuya | Tokoro, Japan |
| Jordon McDonald | Jacques Gauthier | Elias Huminicki | Cameron Olafson | | Winnipeg, Manitoba |
| Ryo Ogihara | Hayato Ueno | Keito Sanuki | Daisuke Sonoyama | | Karuizawa, Japan |
| Jeong Yeong-seok (Note: Jeong Yeong-seok skipped Team Park.) | Park Jong-duk | Lee Ki-bok | Oh Seung-hoon | Seong Ji-hoon | Gangwon, South Korea |
| Kim Schwaller | Max Winz | Andreas Gerlach | Jan Iseli | | Oberwallis, Switzerland |
| Benoît Schwarz-van Berkel (Fourth) | Yannick Schwaller (Skip) | Sven Michel | Pablo Lachat-Couchepin | | Geneva, Switzerland |
| Matt Tolley | Matt Duizer | Jesse Monette | Darin Gerow | | Penticton, British Columbia |
| Evan van Amsterdam | Jeremy Harty | Jason Ginter | Parker Konschuh | | Edmonton, Alberta |
| Jay Wakefield | Matthew McCrady | Chris Parkinson | Daniel Deng | | New Westminster, British Columbia |
| Riku Yanagisawa (Fourth) | Tsuyoshi Yamaguchi (Skip) | Takeru Yamamoto | Satoshi Koizumi | | Karuizawa, Japan |

== Round robin standings ==
Final Round Robin Standings

Key
| Teams to Playoffs |

| Pool A | W | L | PF | PA |
|---|---|---|---|---|
| (Switzerland) Yannick Schwaller | 5 | 0 | 34 | 13 |
| (South Korea) Jeong Byeong-jin | 3 | 2 | 24 | 23 |
| (Alberta) Kevin Koe | 3 | 2 | 34 | 26 |
| (Switzerland) Kim Schwaller | 3 | 2 | 29 | 23 |
| (British Columbia) Jim Cotter | 1 | 4 | 20 | 25 |
| (Japan) Ryo Ogihara | 0 | 5 | 5 | 36 |

| Pool B | W | L | PF | PA |
|---|---|---|---|---|
| (Sweden) Oskar Eriksson | 4 | 1 | 38 | 22 |
| (Japan) Takumi Maeda | 4 | 1 | 36 | 22 |
| (Alberta) Evan van Amsterdam | 4 | 1 | 36 | 19 |
| (British Columbia) Mitchell Kopytko | 2 | 3 | 25 | 34 |
| (Alberta) Jacob Libbus | 1 | 4 | 25 | 36 |
| (British Columbia) Cody Claeys | 0 | 5 | 16 | 43 |

| Pool C | W | L | PF | PA |
|---|---|---|---|---|
| (Alberta) Brendan Bottcher | 5 | 0 | 35 | 11 |
| (Manitoba) Jordon McDonald | 4 | 1 | 32 | 21 |
| (Japan) Shinya Abe | 3 | 2 | 26 | 28 |
| (South Korea) Lee Jae-beom | 2 | 3 | 27 | 23 |
| (British Columbia) Matt Tolley | 1 | 4 | 15 | 32 |
| (Alberta) Zach Davies | 0 | 5 | 16 | 36 |

| Pool D | W | L | PF | PA |
|---|---|---|---|---|
| (Switzerland) Marco Hösli | 5 | 0 | 39 | 11 |
| (Japan) Tsuyoshi Yamaguchi | 4 | 1 | 26 | 20 |
| (British Columbia) Matthew Hall | 2 | 3 | 21 | 26 |
| (South Korea) Team Park | 2 | 3 | 22 | 26 |
| (British Columbia) Matthew Blandford | 1 | 4 | 14 | 28 |
| (British Columbia) Jay Wakefield | 1 | 4 | 21 | 32 |

== Round robin results ==
All draw times are listed in Pacific Time (UTC−08:00).

=== Draw 1 ===
Thursday, October 8, 8:30 am

| Sheet A | 1 | 2 | 3 | 4 | 5 | 6 | 7 | 8 | 9 | Final |
| (British Columbia) Matthew Hall | 0 | 1 | 0 | 1 | 2 | 0 | 1 | 0 | 0 | 5 |
| (British Columbia) Jay Wakefield 🔨 | 1 | 0 | 1 | 0 | 0 | 2 | 0 | 1 | 1 | 6 |

| Sheet B | 1 | 2 | 3 | 4 | 5 | 6 | 7 | 8 | Final |
| (Alberta) Zach Davies 🔨 | 2 | 0 | 2 | 0 | 0 | 1 | 0 | X | 5 |
| (South Korea) Lee Jae-beom | 0 | 2 | 0 | 3 | 1 | 0 | 3 | X | 9 |

| Sheet C | 1 | 2 | 3 | 4 | 5 | 6 | 7 | 8 | Final |
| (Manitoba) Jordon McDonald 🔨 | 0 | 0 | 2 | 0 | 0 | 2 | 0 | 4 | 8 |
| (Japan) Shinya Abe | 1 | 1 | 0 | 2 | 1 | 0 | 2 | 0 | 7 |

| Sheet D | 1 | 2 | 3 | 4 | 5 | 6 | 7 | 8 | Final |
| (Switzerland) Marco Hösli 🔨 | 2 | 1 | 0 | 1 | 2 | 2 | X | X | 8 |
| (South Korea) Team Park | 0 | 0 | 2 | 0 | 0 | 0 | X | X | 2 |

| Sheet E | 1 | 2 | 3 | 4 | 5 | 6 | 7 | 8 | Final |
| (Alberta) Brendan Bottcher 🔨 | 2 | 1 | 0 | 3 | X | X | X | X | 6 |
| (British Columbia) Matt Tolley | 0 | 0 | 1 | 0 | X | X | X | X | 1 |

| Sheet F | 1 | 2 | 3 | 4 | 5 | 6 | 7 | 8 | Final |
| (Japan) Tsuyoshi Yamaguchi 🔨 | 1 | 2 | 0 | 0 | 2 | 0 | 0 | X | 5 |
| (British Columbia) Matthew Blandford | 0 | 0 | 2 | 0 | 0 | 1 | 0 | X | 3 |

=== Draw 2 ===
Thursday, October 8, 12:00 pm

| Sheet A | 1 | 2 | 3 | 4 | 5 | 6 | 7 | 8 | Final |
| (Alberta) Jacob Libbus | 0 | 3 | 0 | 1 | 0 | 0 | 1 | 0 | 5 |
| (British Columbia) Mitchell Kopytko 🔨 | 2 | 0 | 2 | 0 | 0 | 2 | 0 | 1 | 7 |

| Sheet B | 1 | 2 | 3 | 4 | 5 | 6 | 7 | 8 | Final |
| (South Korea) Jeong Byeong-jin | 0 | 2 | 2 | 1 | 0 | 2 | 0 | X | 7 |
| (British Columbia) Jim Cotter 🔨 | 0 | 0 | 0 | 0 | 3 | 0 | 1 | X | 4 |

| Sheet C | 1 | 2 | 3 | 4 | 5 | 6 | 7 | 8 | Final |
| (Alberta) Kevin Koe | 1 | 0 | 2 | 0 | 1 | 1 | 1 | 0 | 6 |
| (Switzerland) Kim Schwaller 🔨 | 0 | 5 | 0 | 1 | 0 | 0 | 0 | 3 | 9 |

| Sheet D | 1 | 2 | 3 | 4 | 5 | 6 | 7 | 8 | Final |
| (Sweden) Oskar Eriksson | 1 | 0 | 2 | 0 | 3 | 4 | X | X | 10 |
| (British Columbia) Cody Claeys 🔨 | 0 | 1 | 0 | 1 | 0 | 0 | X | X | 2 |

| Sheet E | 1 | 2 | 3 | 4 | 5 | 6 | 7 | 8 | Final |
| (Switzerland) Yannick Schwaller | 0 | 1 | 3 | 3 | X | X | X | X | 7 |
| (Japan) Ryo Ogihara 🔨 | 0 | 0 | 0 | 0 | X | X | X | X | 0 |

| Sheet F | 1 | 2 | 3 | 4 | 5 | 6 | 7 | 8 | Final |
| (Alberta) Evan van Amsterdam 🔨 | 0 | 0 | 0 | 2 | 0 | 2 | 0 | X | 4 |
| (Japan) Takumi Maeda | 1 | 1 | 1 | 0 | 2 | 0 | 3 | X | 8 |

=== Draw 3 ===
Thursday, October 8, 3:30 pm

| Sheet A | 1 | 2 | 3 | 4 | 5 | 6 | 7 | 8 | Final |
| (Switzerland) Marco Hösli 🔨 | 2 | 0 | 2 | 3 | X | X | X | X | 7 |
| (British Columbia) Matthew Blandford | 0 | 1 | 0 | 0 | X | X | X | X | 1 |

| Sheet B | 1 | 2 | 3 | 4 | 5 | 6 | 7 | 8 | Final |
| (Alberta) Brendan Bottcher 🔨 | 1 | 1 | 0 | 0 | 2 | 4 | X | X | 8 |
| (Japan) Shinya Abe | 0 | 0 | 2 | 0 | 0 | 0 | X | X | 2 |

| Sheet C | 1 | 2 | 3 | 4 | 5 | 6 | 7 | 8 | Final |
| (South Korea) Lee Jae-beom | 0 | 0 | 1 | 0 | 1 | 0 | 2 | X | 4 |
| (Manitoba) Jordon McDonald 🔨 | 2 | 1 | 0 | 1 | 0 | 2 | 0 | X | 6 |

| Sheet D | 1 | 2 | 3 | 4 | 5 | 6 | 7 | 8 | Final |
| (British Columbia) Matt Tolley | 0 | 0 | 1 | 0 | 1 | 0 | 2 | 3 | 7 |
| (Alberta) Zach Davies 🔨 | 1 | 2 | 0 | 1 | 0 | 1 | 0 | 0 | 5 |

| Sheet E | 1 | 2 | 3 | 4 | 5 | 6 | 7 | 8 | Final |
| (South Korea) Team Park 🔨 | 0 | 0 | 1 | 0 | 0 | 1 | 0 | X | 2 |
| (British Columbia) Matthew Hall | 0 | 1 | 0 | 0 | 1 | 0 | 3 | X | 5 |

| Sheet F | 1 | 2 | 3 | 4 | 5 | 6 | 7 | 8 | Final |
| (British Columbia) Jay Wakefield | 0 | 1 | 0 | 0 | 2 | 1 | 0 | X | 4 |
| (Japan) Tsuyoshi Yamaguchi 🔨 | 2 | 0 | 0 | 0 | 0 | 0 | 4 | X | 6 |

=== Draw 4 ===
Thursday, October 8, 7:00 pm

| Sheet A | 1 | 2 | 3 | 4 | 5 | 6 | 7 | 8 | Final |
| (Sweden) Oskar Eriksson 🔨 | 2 | 0 | 1 | 0 | 4 | 0 | X | X | 7 |
| (Japan) Takumi Maeda | 0 | 1 | 0 | 1 | 0 | 1 | X | X | 3 |

| Sheet B | 1 | 2 | 3 | 4 | 5 | 6 | 7 | 8 | Final |
| (Switzerland) Yannick Schwaller 🔨 | 4 | 0 | 2 | 1 | 1 | X | X | X | 8 |
| (Switzerland) Kim Schwaller | 0 | 3 | 0 | 0 | 0 | X | X | X | 3 |

| Sheet C | 1 | 2 | 3 | 4 | 5 | 6 | 7 | 8 | Final |
| (British Columbia) Mitchell Kopytko | 0 | 0 | 0 | 0 | 1 | 0 | X | X | 1 |
| (Alberta) Evan van Amsterdam 🔨 | 0 | 2 | 0 | 1 | 0 | 4 | X | X | 7 |

| Sheet D | 1 | 2 | 3 | 4 | 5 | 6 | 7 | 8 | Final |
| (Japan) Ryo Ogihara | 0 | 1 | 0 | 0 | 0 | X | X | X | 1 |
| (South Korea) Jeong Byeong-jin 🔨 | 1 | 0 | 3 | 1 | 1 | X | X | X | 6 |

| Sheet E | 1 | 2 | 3 | 4 | 5 | 6 | 7 | 8 | Final |
| (British Columbia) Cody Claeys | 1 | 0 | 1 | 0 | 1 | 0 | 0 | X | 3 |
| (Alberta) Jacob Libbus 🔨 | 0 | 1 | 0 | 2 | 0 | 3 | 2 | X | 8 |

| Sheet F | 1 | 2 | 3 | 4 | 5 | 6 | 7 | 8 | Final |
| (British Columbia) Jim Cotter 🔨 | 0 | 0 | 0 | 0 | 4 | 0 | 0 | X | 4 |
| (Alberta) Kevin Koe | 1 | 0 | 0 | 1 | 0 | 2 | 3 | X | 7 |

=== Draw 5 ===
Friday, October 9, 8:30 am

| Sheet A | 1 | 2 | 3 | 4 | 5 | 6 | 7 | 8 | 9 | Final |
| (Alberta) Brendan Bottcher | 0 | 0 | 1 | 0 | 2 | 0 | 0 | 0 | 3 | 6 |
| (South Korea) Lee Jae-beom 🔨 | 0 | 0 | 0 | 0 | 0 | 0 | 2 | 1 | 0 | 3 |

| Sheet B | 1 | 2 | 3 | 4 | 5 | 6 | 7 | 8 | Final |
| (Switzerland) Marco Hösli 🔨 | 0 | 0 | 2 | 2 | 1 | 0 | 2 | X | 7 |
| (British Columbia) Jay Wakefield | 0 | 1 | 0 | 0 | 0 | 1 | 0 | X | 2 |

| Sheet C | 1 | 2 | 3 | 4 | 5 | 6 | 7 | 8 | Final |
| (South Korea) Team Park 🔨 | 0 | 0 | 0 | 3 | 0 | 1 | 1 | X | 5 |
| (British Columbia) Matthew Blandford | 0 | 1 | 0 | 0 | 2 | 0 | 0 | X | 3 |

| Sheet D | 1 | 2 | 3 | 4 | 5 | 6 | 7 | 8 | Final |
| (British Columbia) Matthew Hall | 1 | 0 | 0 | 0 | 1 | 0 | X | X | 2 |
| (Japan) Tsuyoshi Yamaguchi 🔨 | 0 | 1 | 0 | 3 | 0 | 2 | X | X | 6 |

| Sheet E | 1 | 2 | 3 | 4 | 5 | 6 | 7 | 8 | Final |
| (Alberta) Zach Davies | 0 | 0 | 0 | 1 | 0 | 0 | 0 | X | 1 |
| (Manitoba) Jordon McDonald 🔨 | 2 | 0 | 0 | 0 | 0 | 2 | 1 | X | 5 |

| Sheet F | 1 | 2 | 3 | 4 | 5 | 6 | 7 | 8 | Final |
| (British Columbia) Matt Tolley | 0 | 1 | 0 | 0 | 1 | 0 | 1 | 1 | 4 |
| (Japan) Shinya Abe 🔨 | 2 | 0 | 0 | 2 | 0 | 1 | 0 | 0 | 5 |

=== Draw 6 ===
Friday, October 9, 12:00 pm

| Sheet A | 1 | 2 | 3 | 4 | 5 | 6 | 7 | 8 | Final |
| (Switzerland) Yannick Schwaller 🔨 | 2 | 1 | 0 | 1 | 1 | 0 | X | X | 5 |
| (British Columbia) Jim Cotter | 0 | 0 | 1 | 0 | 0 | 1 | X | X | 2 |

| Sheet B | 1 | 2 | 3 | 4 | 5 | 6 | 7 | 8 | Final |
| (Sweden) Oskar Eriksson 🔨 | 3 | 0 | 1 | 0 | 4 | 0 | X | X | 8 |
| (British Columbia) Mitchell Kopytko | 0 | 2 | 0 | 2 | 0 | 1 | X | X | 5 |

| Sheet C | 1 | 2 | 3 | 4 | 5 | 6 | 7 | 8 | Final |
| (British Columbia) Cody Claeys | 0 | 2 | 0 | 0 | 0 | 2 | 0 | X | 4 |
| (Japan) Takumi Maeda 🔨 | 1 | 0 | 2 | 1 | 2 | 0 | 2 | X | 8 |

| Sheet D | 1 | 2 | 3 | 4 | 5 | 6 | 7 | 8 | Final |
| (Alberta) Jacob Libbus | 0 | 1 | 0 | 3 | 0 | 1 | 0 | X | 5 |
| (Alberta) Evan van Amsterdam 🔨 | 4 | 0 | 1 | 0 | 1 | 0 | 2 | X | 8 |

| Sheet E | 1 | 2 | 3 | 4 | 5 | 6 | 7 | 8 | Final |
| (South Korea) Jeong Byeong-jin 🔨 | 0 | 0 | 1 | 0 | 0 | X | X | X | 1 |
| (Alberta) Kevin Koe | 2 | 3 | 0 | 1 | 3 | X | X | X | 9 |

| Sheet F | 1 | 2 | 3 | 4 | 5 | 6 | 7 | 8 | Final |
| (Japan) Ryo Ogihara | 0 | 0 | 0 | 0 | X | X | X | X | 0 |
| (Switzerland) Kim Schwaller 🔨 | 2 | 1 | 2 | 3 | X | X | X | X | 8 |

=== Draw 7 ===
Friday, October 9, 3:30 pm

| Sheet A | 1 | 2 | 3 | 4 | 5 | 6 | 7 | 8 | Final |
| (Japan) Shinya Abe 🔨 | 2 | 0 | 2 | 0 | 1 | 2 | 0 | X | 7 |
| (Alberta) Zach Davies | 0 | 1 | 0 | 2 | 0 | 0 | 1 | X | 4 |

| Sheet B | 1 | 2 | 3 | 4 | 5 | 6 | 7 | 8 | Final |
| (British Columbia) Matthew Blandford 🔨 | 0 | 0 | 1 | 0 | 0 | 0 | X | X | 1 |
| (British Columbia) Matthew Hall | 1 | 2 | 0 | 0 | 1 | 2 | X | X | 6 |

| Sheet C | 1 | 2 | 3 | 4 | 5 | 6 | 7 | 8 | Final |
| (South Korea) Lee Jae-beom | 2 | 2 | 0 | 3 | X | X | X | X | 7 |
| (British Columbia) Matt Tolley 🔨 | 0 | 0 | 1 | 0 | X | X | X | X | 1 |

| Sheet D | 1 | 2 | 3 | 4 | 5 | 6 | 7 | 8 | Final |
| (Alberta) Brendan Bottcher 🔨 | 2 | 0 | 0 | 3 | 0 | 0 | 0 | 2 | 7 |
| (Manitoba) Jordon McDonald | 0 | 0 | 1 | 0 | 1 | 1 | 1 | 0 | 4 |

| Sheet E | 1 | 2 | 3 | 4 | 5 | 6 | 7 | 8 | Final |
| (Switzerland) Marco Hösli | 0 | 1 | 1 | 0 | 3 | 0 | 1 | X | 6 |
| (Japan) Tsuyoshi Yamaguchi 🔨 | 1 | 0 | 0 | 1 | 0 | 1 | 0 | X | 3 |

| Sheet F | 1 | 2 | 3 | 4 | 5 | 6 | 7 | 8 | Final |
| (British Columbia) Jay Wakefield | 0 | 1 | 0 | 2 | 0 | 1 | 0 | X | 4 |
| (South Korea) Team Park 🔨 | 3 | 0 | 1 | 0 | 1 | 0 | 3 | X | 8 |

=== Draw 8 ===
Friday, October 9, 7:00 pm

| Sheet A | 1 | 2 | 3 | 4 | 5 | 6 | 7 | 8 | Final |
| (Switzerland) Kim Schwaller 🔨 | 2 | 0 | 1 | 1 | 0 | 0 | 0 | 0 | 4 |
| (South Korea) Jeong Byeong-jin | 0 | 2 | 0 | 0 | 2 | 1 | 1 | 1 | 7 |

| Sheet B | 1 | 2 | 3 | 4 | 5 | 6 | 7 | 8 | Final |
| (Japan) Takumi Maeda 🔨 | 1 | 2 | 0 | 2 | 0 | 2 | 1 | X | 8 |
| (Alberta) Jacob Libbus | 0 | 0 | 2 | 0 | 1 | 0 | 0 | X | 3 |

| Sheet C | 1 | 2 | 3 | 4 | 5 | 6 | 7 | 8 | Final |
| (British Columbia) Jim Cotter | 0 | 4 | 2 | 2 | X | X | X | X | 8 |
| (Japan) Ryo Ogihara 🔨 | 1 | 0 | 0 | 0 | X | X | X | X | 1 |

| Sheet D | 1 | 2 | 3 | 4 | 5 | 6 | 7 | 8 | 9 | Final |
| (Switzerland) Yannick Schwaller 🔨 | 0 | 2 | 0 | 0 | 2 | 0 | 1 | 0 | 4 | 9 |
| (Alberta) Kevin Koe | 1 | 0 | 1 | 0 | 0 | 2 | 0 | 1 | 0 | 5 |

| Sheet E | 1 | 2 | 3 | 4 | 5 | 6 | 7 | 8 | Final |
| (Sweden) Oskar Eriksson | 0 | 2 | 0 | 1 | 0 | 0 | X | X | 3 |
| (Alberta) Evan van Amsterdam 🔨 | 2 | 0 | 1 | 0 | 3 | 2 | X | X | 8 |

| Sheet F | 1 | 2 | 3 | 4 | 5 | 6 | 7 | 8 | Final |
| (British Columbia) Mitchell Kopytko 🔨 | 4 | 0 | 0 | 3 | 0 | 0 | 1 | X | 8 |
| (British Columbia) Cody Claeys | 0 | 2 | 1 | 0 | 1 | 1 | 0 | X | 5 |

=== Draw 9 ===
Saturday, October 10, 8:30 am

| Sheet A | 1 | 2 | 3 | 4 | 5 | 6 | 7 | 8 | Final |
| (Alberta) Evan van Amsterdam | 3 | 1 | 0 | 2 | 2 | 1 | X | X | 9 |
| (British Columbia) Cody Claeys 🔨 | 0 | 0 | 2 | 0 | 0 | 0 | X | X | 2 |

| Sheet B | 1 | 2 | 3 | 4 | 5 | 6 | 7 | 8 | Final |
| (Alberta) Kevin Koe 🔨 | 1 | 1 | 0 | 1 | 2 | 0 | 2 | X | 7 |
| (Japan) Ryo Ogihara | 0 | 0 | 2 | 0 | 0 | 1 | 0 | X | 3 |

| Sheet C | 1 | 2 | 3 | 4 | 5 | 6 | 7 | 8 | Final |
| (Switzerland) Yannick Schwaller | 0 | 0 | 2 | 0 | 2 | 0 | 1 | X | 5 |
| (South Korea) Jeong Byeong-jin 🔨 | 1 | 0 | 0 | 1 | 0 | 1 | 0 | X | 3 |

| Sheet D | 1 | 2 | 3 | 4 | 5 | 6 | 7 | 8 | Final |
| (Switzerland) Kim Schwaller 🔨 | 2 | 0 | 3 | 0 | X | X | X | X | 5 |
| (British Columbia) Jim Cotter | 0 | 1 | 0 | 1 | X | X | X | X | 2 |

| Sheet E | 1 | 2 | 3 | 4 | 5 | 6 | 7 | 8 | Final |
| (British Columbia) Mitchell Kopytko | 0 | 0 | 2 | 0 | 2 | 0 | 0 | X | 4 |
| (Japan) Takumi Maeda 🔨 | 2 | 1 | 0 | 1 | 0 | 3 | 2 | X | 9 |

| Sheet F | 1 | 2 | 3 | 4 | 5 | 6 | 7 | 8 | Final |
| (Sweden) Oskar Eriksson 🔨 | 2 | 0 | 2 | 0 | 2 | 4 | X | X | 10 |
| (Alberta) Jacob Libbus | 0 | 2 | 0 | 2 | 0 | 0 | X | X | 4 |

=== Draw 10 ===
Saturday, October 10, 12:00 pm

| Sheet A | 1 | 2 | 3 | 4 | 5 | 6 | 7 | 8 | Final |
| (Japan) Tsuyoshi Yamaguchi 🔨 | 1 | 0 | 1 | 0 | 0 | 1 | 0 | 3 | 6 |
| (South Korea) Team Park | 0 | 2 | 0 | 0 | 1 | 0 | 2 | 0 | 5 |

| Sheet B | 1 | 2 | 3 | 4 | 5 | 6 | 7 | 8 | Final |
| (Manitoba) Jordon McDonald 🔨 | 2 | 0 | 0 | 4 | 0 | 3 | X | X | 9 |
| (British Columbia) Matt Tolley | 0 | 1 | 0 | 0 | 1 | 0 | X | X | 2 |

| Sheet C | 1 | 2 | 3 | 4 | 5 | 6 | 7 | 8 | Final |
| (Alberta) Brendan Bottcher 🔨 | 2 | 1 | 0 | 0 | 1 | 4 | X | X | 8 |
| (Alberta) Zach Davies | 0 | 0 | 0 | 1 | 0 | 0 | X | X | 1 |

| Sheet D | 1 | 2 | 3 | 4 | 5 | 6 | 7 | 8 | 9 | Final |
| (British Columbia) Matthew Blandford 🔨 | 2 | 0 | 2 | 0 | 1 | 0 | 0 | 0 | 1 | 6 |
| (British Columbia) Jay Wakefield | 0 | 0 | 0 | 1 | 0 | 0 | 2 | 2 | 0 | 5 |

| Sheet E | 1 | 2 | 3 | 4 | 5 | 6 | 7 | 8 | Final |
| (Japan) Shinya Abe 🔨 | 0 | 1 | 0 | 0 | 2 | 2 | 0 | X | 5 |
| (South Korea) Lee Jae-beom | 1 | 0 | 0 | 1 | 0 | 0 | 2 | X | 4 |

| Sheet F | 1 | 2 | 3 | 4 | 5 | 6 | 7 | 8 | Final |
| (Switzerland) Marco Hösli | 0 | 6 | 0 | 5 | X | X | X | X | 11 |
| (British Columbia) Matthew Hall 🔨 | 1 | 0 | 2 | 0 | X | X | X | X | 3 |

== Playoffs ==
Qualification Round
8 | (Alberta) Kevin Koe | 9
9 | (Japan) Takumi Maeda | 5
5 | (Japan) Tsuyoshi Yamaguchi | 9
12 | (Japan) Shinya Abe | 4
7 | (South Korea) Jeong Byeong-jin | 7
10 | (Alberta) Evan van Amsterdam | 3
6 | (Manitoba) Jordon McDonald | 7
11 | (Switzerland) Kim Schwaller | 4

Quarterfinals
1 | (Alberta) Brendan Bottcher | 5
8 | (Alberta) Kevin Koe | 3
4 | (Sweden) Oskar Eriksson | 7
5 | (Japan) Tsuyoshi Yamaguchi | 3
2 | (Switzerland) Yannick Schwaller | 8
7 | (South Korea) Jeong Byeong-jin | 2
3 | (Switzerland) Marco Hösli | 6
6 | (Manitoba) Jordon McDonald | 5

Semifinals
1 | (Alberta) Brendan Bottcher | 3
4 | (Sweden) Oskar Eriksson | 9
2 | (Switzerland) Yannick Schwaller | 4
3 | (Switzerland) Marco Hösli | 7

Final
4 | (Sweden) Oskar Eriksson | 6
3 | (Switzerland) Marco Hösli | 5

=== Qualification Round ===
Saturday, October 10, 3:30 pm

| Sheet B | 1 | 2 | 3 | 4 | 5 | 6 | 7 | 8 | Final |
| (South Korea) Jeong Byeong-jin | 0 | 0 | 2 | 0 | 2 | 0 | 3 | X | 7 |
| (Alberta) Evan van Amsterdam 🔨 | 0 | 0 | 0 | 2 | 0 | 1 | 0 | X | 3 |

| Sheet C | 1 | 2 | 3 | 4 | 5 | 6 | 7 | 8 | Final |
| (Alberta) Kevin Koe | 1 | 0 | 2 | 0 | 2 | 0 | 4 | X | 9 |
| (Japan) Takumi Maeda 🔨 | 0 | 2 | 0 | 1 | 0 | 2 | 0 | X | 5 |

| Sheet D | 1 | 2 | 3 | 4 | 5 | 6 | 7 | 8 | Final |
| (Japan) Tsuyoshi Yamaguchi 🔨 | 5 | 0 | 0 | 2 | 0 | 2 | X | X | 9 |
| (Japan) Shinya Abe | 0 | 0 | 3 | 0 | 1 | 0 | X | X | 4 |

| Sheet E | 1 | 2 | 3 | 4 | 5 | 6 | 7 | 8 | Final |
| (Manitoba) Jordon McDonald | 1 | 0 | 5 | 0 | 1 | 0 | X | X | 7 |
| (Switzerland) Kim Schwaller 🔨 | 0 | 2 | 0 | 1 | 0 | 1 | X | X | 4 |

=== Quarterfinals ===
Saturday, October 10, 7:00 pm

| Sheet B | 1 | 2 | 3 | 4 | 5 | 6 | 7 | 8 | Final |
| (Switzerland) Marco Hösli 🔨 | 1 | 1 | 0 | 1 | 0 | 3 | 0 | 0 | 6 |
| (Manitoba) Jordon McDonald | 0 | 0 | 1 | 0 | 1 | 0 | 2 | 1 | 5 |

| Sheet C | 1 | 2 | 3 | 4 | 5 | 6 | 7 | 8 | Final |
| (Sweden) Oskar Eriksson 🔨 | 1 | 0 | 2 | 0 | 1 | 0 | 2 | 1 | 7 |
| (Japan) Tsuyoshi Yamaguchi | 0 | 1 | 0 | 1 | 0 | 1 | 0 | 0 | 3 |

| Sheet D | 1 | 2 | 3 | 4 | 5 | 6 | 7 | 8 | Final |
| (Alberta) Brendan Bottcher 🔨 | 0 | 2 | 0 | 0 | 0 | 0 | 0 | 3 | 5 |
| (Alberta) Kevin Koe | 1 | 0 | 1 | 0 | 0 | 0 | 1 | 0 | 3 |

| Sheet E | 1 | 2 | 3 | 4 | 5 | 6 | 7 | 8 | Final |
| (Switzerland) Yannick Schwaller 🔨 | 1 | 1 | 3 | 0 | 1 | 2 | X | X | 8 |
| (South Korea) Jeong Byeong-jin | 0 | 0 | 0 | 2 | 0 | 0 | X | X | 2 |

=== Semifinals ===
Sunday, October 11, 8:30 am

| Sheet B | 1 | 2 | 3 | 4 | 5 | 6 | 7 | 8 | Final |
| (Alberta) Brendan Bottcher 🔨 | 1 | 0 | 1 | 1 | 0 | X | X | X | 3 |
| (Sweden) Oskar Eriksson | 0 | 3 | 0 | 0 | 6 | X | X | X | 9 |

| Sheet D | 1 | 2 | 3 | 4 | 5 | 6 | 7 | 8 | Final |
| (Switzerland) Yannick Schwaller | 0 | 0 | 2 | 0 | 2 | 0 | 0 | X | 4 |
| (Switzerland) Marco Hösli 🔨 | 0 | 2 | 0 | 2 | 0 | 0 | 3 | X | 7 |

=== Final ===
Sunday, October 11, 12:00 pm

| Sheet C | 1 | 2 | 3 | 4 | 5 | 6 | 7 | 8 | Final |
| (Sweden) Oskar Eriksson | 0 | 0 | 2 | 0 | 1 | 0 | 1 | 2 | 6 |
| (Switzerland) Marco Hösli 🔨 | 1 | 2 | 0 | 1 | 0 | 1 | 0 | 0 | 5 |
