= Ashley Furniture Industries =

American retailer

Ashley Furniture Industries, Inc.

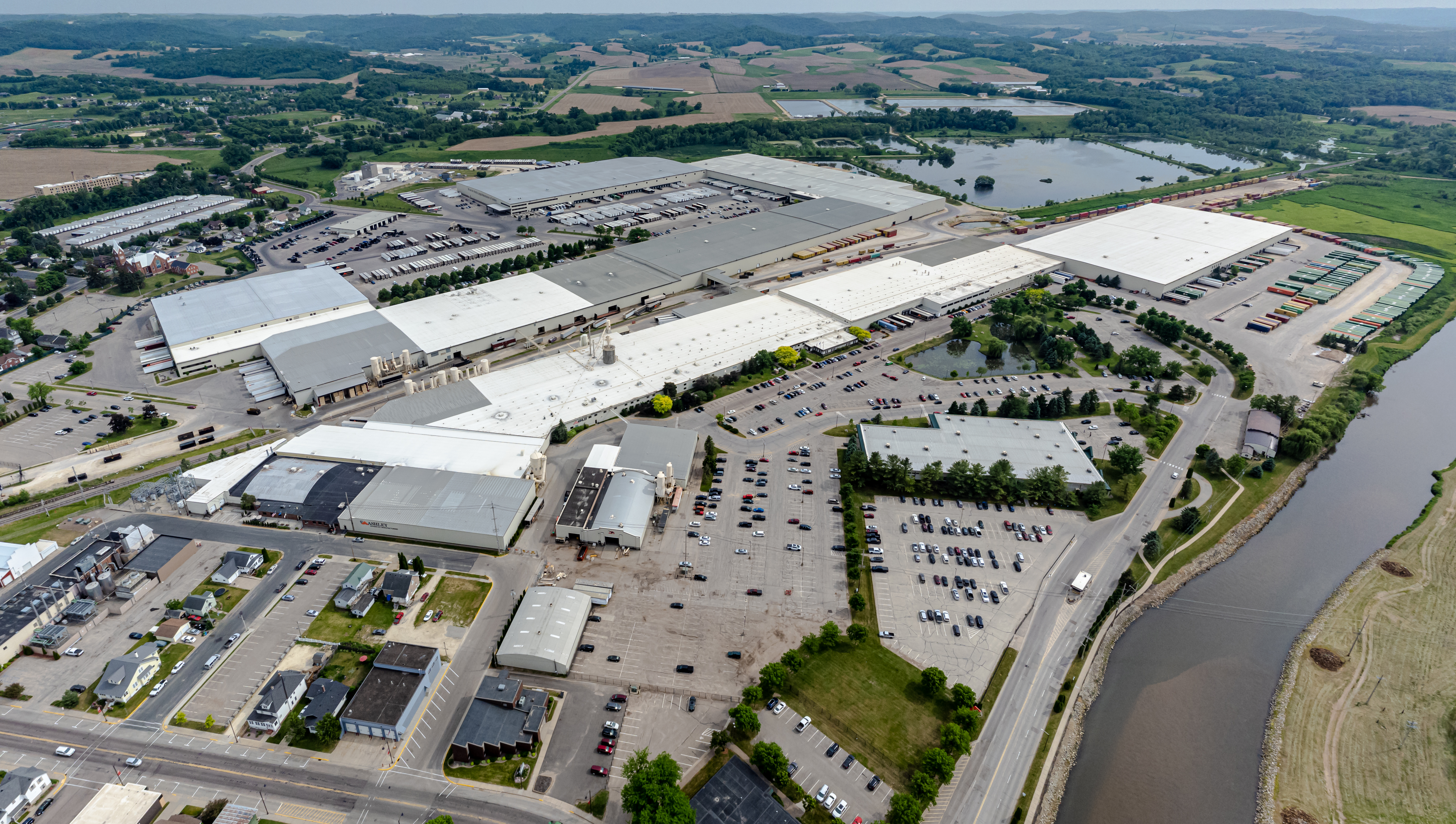
- Headquarters plant in Arcadia, Wisconsin
- Type: Private
- Industry: Furnishings
- Founded: 1945; 81 years ago Chicago, Illinois, U.S.
- Founder: Ronald G. Wanek
- Headquarters: Arcadia, Wisconsin, U.S.
- Key people: Todd R. Wanek (CEO); Ronald G. Wanek
- Products: Upholstered furniture and casegoods
- Revenue: ▲US$10.3 billion (2022)
- Number of employees: 35,000 (2021)
- Subsidiaries: Ashley HomeStore
- Website: www.ashleyfurnitureindustriesllc.com

Ashley Furniture Industries, Inc. is an American home furnishings manufacturer and retailer, headquartered in Arcadia, Wisconsin. The company is owned by father and son team Ron and Todd Wanek. Ashley Furniture manufactures and distributes home furniture products throughout the world.

Ashley Furniture Industries sells home furnishings and accessories available through two distribution channels: independent furniture dealers and more than 1000 Ashley Furniture HomeStore retail furniture stores, which are independently owned and operated by licensees in the United States, Canada, Mexico, Chile, Central America, Armenia, and Japan. Ashley Furniture’s website does not differentiate which stores are corporate owned and which stores are independently licensed. Offers, prices, and financing listed on the website may only be available in-store at corporate owned locations and not licensed locations which is not disclosed on the website. It has manufacturing and distribution facilities in Wisconsin, Mississippi, California (only manufacturing closed in 2016 distribution facility remains), Indiana, Pennsylvania, North Carolina, Florida, China, and Vietnam.

== History ==
Carlyle Weinberger founded Ashley Furniture in Chicago in 1945 as a sales operation. Specializing in wooden occasional furniture, Ashley marketed goods made by local companies. Later the company opened a branch in Goshen, Indiana. In 1970, Ashley invested in the Wisconsin-based Arcadia Furniture, founded by Ronald G. Wanek. Even though Arcadia started out as a small production plant for Ashley's lines in 1976, a group of investors bought out Weinberger, taking control of Ashley Furniture. At first the two companies maintained their separate identities, with Arcadia focusing on production and Ashley on sales.

By 1982, the merged company's annual sales reached $12 million and it had moved its corporate headquarters from Chicago to Arcadia. By the mid-1980s, Ashley offered a line of roughly 350 different furniture products, and had turned its design and manufacturing away from "heirloom pieces" toward products aimed at middle-income buyers. The company's growing network included wholesalers such as Levitz Furniture and mass-retailers such as Sears, Kmart, and Montgomery Ward, in addition to smaller retailers. Sales had climbed to more than $44 million by 1985.

In 1994 Ashley acquired upholstery manufacturer Sklar-Peppler, and by the late 1990s the company was operating assembly and distribution plants in Seattle, Washington; Pomona, California; New Brunswick, New Jersey; and Orlando, Florida. Gambling that motion furniture was a strong growth area, Ashley acquired Gentry Furniture, of Ripley, Mississippi in 1999. That same year the company also branched out into retailing, licensing Ashley Furniture HomeStores to independent dealers. The chain grew in its first year to approximately 40 stores.

By 2000, Ashley Furniture Industries employed more people in Arcadia than the town's population. The plant in Arcadia had grown from 35,000 square feet (3,300 m^{2}) in 1970 to 1,500,000 square feet (140,000 m^{2}). In 2015, the US Occupational Safety and Health Administration imposed $1.7 million in fines on Ashley due to unsafe working conditions at its Arcadia plant which caused over one thousand injuries to workers.

In 2015, OSHA cited the company for numerous violations with Ashley Furniture facing $1.7 million in penalties. Tom Perez, the United States Secretary of Labor at the time, said "Regrettably, Ashley Furniture has become a frequent flier for OSHA. We have been inspecting this plant a number of times. We have found violations previously. They have been fined; we have come back. The fundamental challenge is they need to build a better culture of safety, and that hasn’t happened" In 2016, OSHA announced that Ashley Furniture had agreed to correct all violations and pay penalties of $1.75 million.

Today the company maintains plants across the United States and also operates several factories (including its largest) in Pacific Rim countries such as Vietnam and China. They also have sourcing offices in India, Vietnam, Southern China, Muar, and Taiwan.

In 2023 the Canadian government and the U.S. Consumer Product Safety Commission issued a joint recall of over 260,000 units because of a fire hazard.

In 2024, Ashley Home acquired Resident Home.

== Retail presence ==
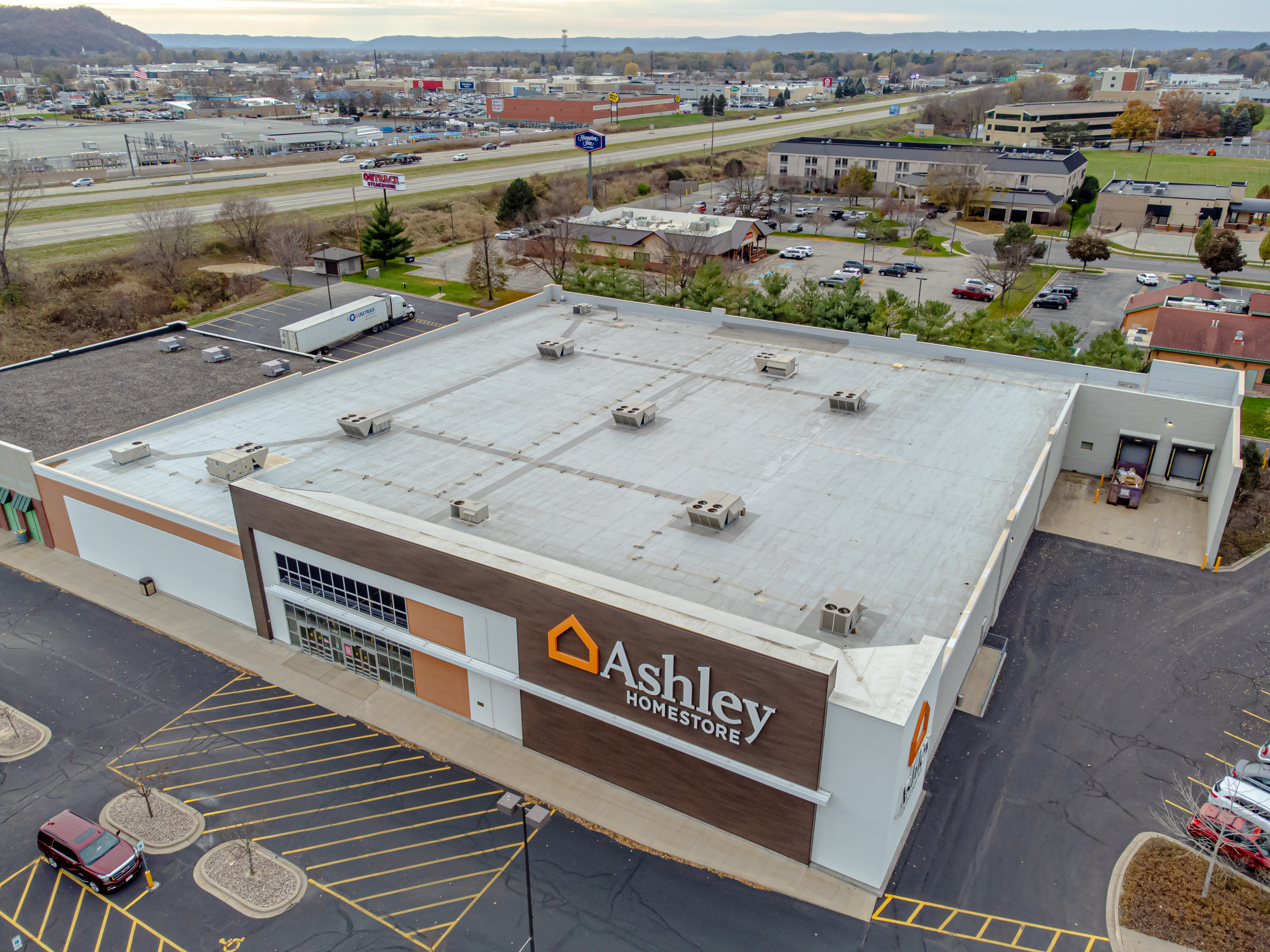
Ashley HomeStore in Onalaska, Wisconsin

The Ashley HomeStore chain of furniture stores is composed of corporate owned stores and independently owned stores with licenses to sell Ashley Furniture products exclusively, including mattresses and accessories. There are over 1000 Ashley Furniture HomeStore retail furniture stores operating worldwide in more than 123 countries. Ashley Furniture HomeStore is a retail brand which sells home furniture and accessories. Ashley Furniture HomeStore CEO is Todd Wanek, who replaced CEO Mark Dufresne in 2017.
