= Werner Fromm =

SS and Police Leader and SS-Oberführer (1905–1981)

- Born: 9 April 1905; Husum, Province of Schleswig-Holstein, Kingdom of Prussia, German Empire
- Died: 10 May 1981 (age 76); Bielefeld, North Rhine-Westphalia, West Germany
- Military career
- Allegiance: Nazi Germany
- Branch: Schutzstaffel; Waffen-SS
- Service years: 1931–1945
- Rank: SS-Oberführer and Oberst of Police; Untersturmführer of the Waffen-SS
- Commands: SS and Police Leader, "Bialystok"; Police Commander, "Sarajewo"
- Conflicts: World War II
- Awards: Iron Cross, 2nd class War Merit Cross, 1st and 2nd class with Swords

Werner Fromm (9 April 1905 – 10 May 1981) was a German SS-Oberführer and Oberst of police. During the Second World War he served as the SS and Police Leader (SSPF) in the Bialystok District, and subsequently as the police commander in Sarajevo. He also fought as an officer in the Waffen-SS.

== Early life and career ==
Fromm was born the son of a tax official in Husum, Schleswig-Holstein. He was educated through realschule in Kiel and entered into a banking career in 1922, becoming a bank clerk and loan officer. He joined the SS (SS number 17,080) on 15 June 1931 and became a member of the Nazi Party (membership number 753,170) on 1 December of that year.

Commissioned an SS-Untersturmführer on 15 March 1934, Fromm advanced rapidly in rank and led the signals battalion attached to SS-Oberabschnitte (Main District) "Nord," based in Hamburg, from April through December 1935. For the following year, he was the adjutant of SS-Oberabschnitt "Südost," with headquarters in Breslau (today, Wrocław). This was followed by a brief posting in Landsberg an der Warthe (today, Gorzów Wielkopolski) commanding the 1st battalion of the 54th SS-Standarte in January and February 1937. He next became the Stabsführer (Chief of Staff) of SS-Abschnitt (District) VII in Königsberg (today, Kaliningrad) from 1 March 1937 to 21 March 1938. On that date, he became commander of the 60th SS-Standarte based in Insterburg (today, Chernyakhovsk) and would retain titular command of this unit until 1 January 1943.

== Second World War ==
After the outbreak of the Second World War on 1 September 1939, Fromm performed military service, serving with an army signals unit until November 1940. He returned to his SS regimental command until he was assigned to the staff of the Higher SS and Police Leader (HSSPF) "Russland-Nord" in the Reichskommissariat Ostland as the head of its personnel office from September through December 1941. He was then transferred to the staff of the HSSPF "Russland-Süd" as a special duties officer until January 1942. On 18 January 1942, he was appointed the first SS and Police Leader (SSPF) "Bialystok," reporting to the HSSPF "Russland-Mitte" (Central Russia) SS-Obergruppenführer Erich von dem Bach-Zelewski. In this post, Fromm commanded all SS personnel and police in his jurisdiction, including the Ordnungspolizei (Orpo; regular uniformed police), the SD (intelligence service) and the SiPo (security police), which included the Gestapo (secret police). While in command in Bialystok, forces under his command participated in the liquidation of almost all the ghettos throughout the District beginning on 2 November 1942. During this coordinated operation, nearly 100,000 Jews were rounded up and transported to the Treblinka and Auschwitz extermination camps to be murdered.

On 30 January 1943, Fromm was transferred from Bialystok to the Independent State of Croatia to become the Polizeigebietsfuhrer (Police Area Commander) "Sarajewo," under the HSSPF "Kroatien," SS-Brigadeführer Konstantin Kammerhofer. Fromm served there until 26 April 1944 and was the only holder of this post. On 25 January 1945, he was transferred to the Waffen-SS with the rank of Untersturmführer of reserves, and served with the 16th SS Panzergrenadier Division Reichsführer-SS in Hungary. After the end of the war, Fromm worked as a merchant. An investigation into his wartime activities initiated by the Hamburg public prosecutor's office was discontinued in 1974. He died in Bielefeld in 1981.

SS and police ranks
Date	Rank
14 March 1934	SS-Untersturmführer
1 June 1934 SS-Obersturmführer
30 January 1935	SS-Hauptsturmführer
13 January 1936	SS-Sturmbannführer
20 April 1938	SS-Obersturmbannführer
9 November 1940	SS-Standartenführer
30 January 1943	SS-Oberführer and Oberst of police
25 January 1945	Untersturmführer of reserves (Waffen-SS)

== Sources ==
- Klee, Ernst (2007). Das Personenlexikon zum Dritten Reich. Wer war was vor und nach 1945. Frankfurt-am-Main: Fischer-Taschenbuch-Verlag. ISBN 978-3-596-16048-8.
- Schiffer Publishing Ltd., ed. (2000). SS Officers List: SS-Standartenführer to SS-Oberstgruppenführer (As of 30 January 1942). Schiffer Military History Publishing. ISBN 0-7643-1061-5.
- Yerger, Mark C. (1997). Allgemeine-SS: The Commands, Units and Leaders of the General SS. Schiffer Publishing Ltd. ISBN 0-7643-0145-4.
