= Wank =

Wank or WANK may refer to:

- WANK (computer worm), a computer worm that attacked DEC VAX/VMS systems through DECnet in 1989
- WXTY, a radio station (99.9 FM) licensed to serve Lafayette, Florida, United States, which held the call sign WANK from 2010 to 2018
- Wank (mountain), a German mountain close to the Austrian border
- Masturbation, in British slang
- Wank (surname), including a list of people with the surname

== See also ==
- Wanka (disambiguation)
- Wankel (surname)
- Wanker (disambiguation)
