= Jennifer Furniture =

American furniture retailer

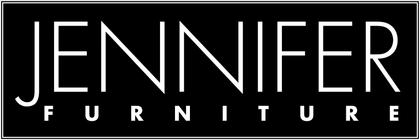
- Type: Private
- Industry: Furnishings
- Founded: 1975
- Headquarters: Great Neck, New York, U.S.
- Number of locations: 6 (2021)
- Key people: John Garg, CEO
- Products: Home Furniture
- Number of employees: 55
- Website: www.jenniferfurniture.com

Jennifer Furniture (formerly Jennifer Convertibles) is an American retail company, based in Great Neck, New York. The company is owned by John Garg and the Namdar Realty Group.

== History and operations ==
The company was founded in 1975 in Woodbury, New York.

On July 19, 2010, the company announced that it had filed for Chapter 11 bankruptcy as a consequence of "substantial losses". According to Furniture Today magazine, the company was number 48 among furniture retailers with around US$114 million in sales for its fiscal year ending August 29, 2009. It subsequently emerged from Chapter 11 under the control of its major supplier, the Haining Mengnu Group. In 2020 "Jennifer Furniture" brand along with the company assets was purchased by JenniferOpCo. Presently the company 6 stores and its online channel is owned and operated by JenniferOpCo.

John Garg, CEO of Jennifer OPCO LLC, is teaming up with another retailer to reintroduce Klaussner Home Furnishings in the retail market after its temporary shutdown in 2023. Further, he is establishing a wholesale division in early 2025. As a part of testing, the CEO said that he wanted to test how Klaussner products are welcomed by his customers at Jennifer Furniture stores. Since it has taken a positive outlook, Klaussner products will be added to Jennifer Furniture stores in the Northeast, followed by a full retail launch scheduled for November. He also underscored his plan to reestablish Klaussner as a key player in the furniture industry. As for the second innings, this brand's products are lined with prices ranging from $1,699.99 to $5,999.00.

=== Stores ===
As of July 20, 2010, the company operated 142 namesake stores and 12 Jennifer Leather stores across the U.S. It also owned 154 Ashley Furniture HomeStores and licensed five others.

As of April 30, 2013, 65 company-owned stores operated under the Jennifer Convertibles and Jennifer Leather names and six stores operated under the Ashley Furniture HomeStores name.

Jennifer Convertibles stores specialize in the retail sale of complete lines of sofa beds, as well as sofas and companion pieces, such as loveseats, chairs and recliners, bedrooms and dining rooms. The company is a dealer of Sealy sofa beds in the United States.

Jennifer Leather stores specialize in the retail sale of leather living room furniture. During the fiscal year ended August 26, 2006, the company closed three stores, of which one was located in Las Vegas, Nevada, and two were located in Indianapolis, Indiana. The year prior, the company closed 20 stores across the country, including locations in Missouri, Kansas, Connecticut, Pennsylvania, California, Massachusetts, Indiana, Florida, Michigan, and New York.

Upon its emergence from bankruptcy in February 2011, the company had 64 Jennifer Convertibles stores and eight Jennifer Leather stores, as well as six licensed Ashley Furniture HomeStores in the greater New York City area.

=== 2020 sale ===
Jennifer Furniture was purchased by John Garg and the Namdar Realty Group in June 2020 from Morris Holdings Ltd. They operate it under the name Jennifer Opco LLC and have six stores as of March 2021.

== Criticism ==
On July 29, 2004, New York Attorney General Eliot Spitzer announced a consent order and judgment that would significantly reform the company's sales practices and provide restitution to consumers. The judgment permanently enjoined the company from engaging in deceptive, fraudulent or illegal business practices, and requires the company to make substantial reforms to its sales practices and customer service operations. The judgment also requires the company to make restitution to consumers for its failure to replace or repair defective goods. In addition, the company agreed to pay $275,000 in penalties, and $2,000 in costs.

The company received a grade "F" from the Better Business Bureau each year from 2006 through 2009 and a grade "A" in 2013. Across the U.S. the company has had complaints for deceptive sales practices, delivery problems, not honoring its warranties and bait-and-switch techniques. Customer complaints were regularly ignored and lawsuits frequently followed.

== Bankruptcy ==
On July 18, 2010, Jennifer Convertibles filed for Chapter 11 bankruptcy protection. At the time of the filing Mr. Rami Abada was the president of the company and Harley Greenfield was the CEO. The company listed their assets valued at about $26 million, with debts estimated to be about $46.4 million. The large and unsecured creditors included Haining Mengnu; Ashley, with a $1.4 million claim, Klaussner, and former manufacturer Stratford/Caye.

Upon emergence from Chapter 11 in February 2011 the Chinese supplier and creditor Haining Mengnu Group received about 90% of the company's new stock. The new management team included CEO Gebing (Morris) Zou, while Mr. Abada continued as president. At the time of the re-organization Jennifer had 64 stores selling sleeper-sofas, eight Jennifer Leather stores and six licensed Ashley Furniture HomeStores in the New York City area.

== See also ==
- Economy of Long Island
- List of New York companies
