= Adam Abramowicz =

Polish Jesuit and philosopher

Adam Abramowicz (1710–1766) was a Polish Jesuit. He taught eloquence, philosophy and moral theology, and also contributed to the construction of several churches and colleges.

He entered the Society of Jesus on August 20, 1726, in Vilnius. In the years 1743–1744 he was a prefect of the Jesuit schools and in the years 1744–1748 was a professor of philosophy at Vilnius University.

In 1752, he became a regent of Vilnius Jesuit boarding school, and later held the post of regent in the Jesuit colleges at Polotsk in 1763–1766 and Minsk in 1766–1770.
