= Wanker (surname) =

Wanker is a surname. Notable people with the surname include:

- Ferdinand Geminian Wanker (1758–1824), German moral theologian
- Jerry Wanker (1956–2000), Belgian guitarist
- Thomas Wanker (born 1973), Austrian composer who works on TV and film scores
- Werner Wanker (born 1958), Austrian curler
- The maiden name of fictional character Peggy Bundy in Married ... with Children
- Arnold Wanker, fictional character from the TV series Mork & Mindy

== See also ==
- Wanker (disambiguation)
- Johanna Wanka, German politician and mathematician
- Wanké
