= Więcław =

Więcław may refer to the following places:

- Więcław, Gmina Barlinek in West Pomeranian Voivodeship (north-west Poland)
- Więcław, Gmina Dębno in West Pomeranian Voivodeship (north-west Poland)
- Więcław, Świdwin County in West Pomeranian Voivodeship (north-west Poland)
