= Wanka =

Wanka, Wanqa, Huanca or their plurals may refer to:

== In Peru ==
- Huanca people or Wancas or Wankas, a Quechua people living in the Junín Region
- Wanka Quechua, a variety of the Quechua language
- Huanca District in Caylloma Province
- Huancas District in Chachapoyas Province
- Deportivo Wanka, a football club
- Huanca (mountain), in the Andes of Peru
- Huanca (monolith), sacred stone monuments

== People ==
- Johanna Wanka (born 1951), German politician
- Rolf Wanka (1901–1982), Austrian actor
- Lamar Nelson (born 1991), known as Wanka, Jamaican football player

== Other uses ==
- Wańka, or Filipinka, unofficial names for a Polish hand grenade

== See also ==
- Wank (disambiguation)
- Wanker (disambiguation)
- Wonka (disambiguation)
- Wanké
- Wänke
- Wainka
