= Huanca (monolith) =

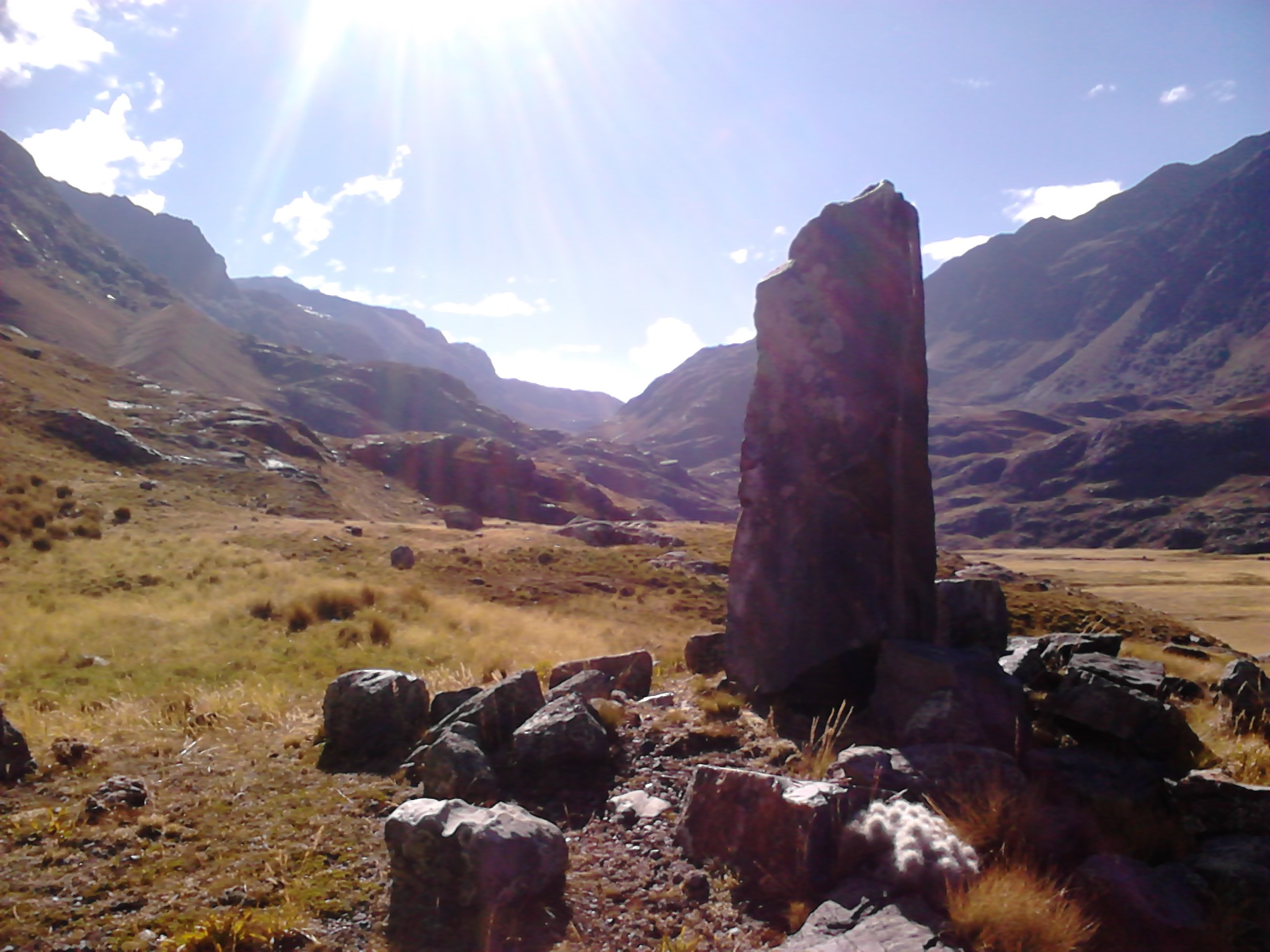
Huanca in the Uquián ravag, on the way from Olleros to Chavín de Huántar, in the Huascarán National Park in Peru.

A huanca (in Quechua ancashino: wanka) or chichic (tsitsiq) is an elongated vertical stone considered sacred, with multiple symbolisms, in the Andean worldview. Huancas were worshipped and given rituals and offerings. The stone placed at the top is called chacrayoc; (in Quechua of Ancash, chakrayuq or "lord of the chakra").

Huanca, while monoliths, are similar to totems (from the Ojibwa word ototeman, meaning 'he is my kinship') of the Native American peoples of North America, as they are considered sacred and can symbolize the ancestor of a community, and thus fulfil a tutelar function. They also resemble menhir, megalithic monuments built in the late Neolithic and Bronze Age in the western Mediterranean and Atlantic Europe.

== Geographical Distribution ==
Huancas are present in several places in the Ancash Andes. Many have been found in the Callejón de Huaylas in the provinces of Recuay, Huaraz (Huancajirca, Pesebre, Markahirka), Carhuaz (Piruro II), Yungay (Cotu, Marcayoc, Keushu), Caraz (Pueblo Viejo) and Sihuas (Huayubamba). Also, huancas have been discovered in Huamanga Province in Ayacucho, in the northern basin of Lake Titicaca in Peru's Puno region, and in Argentina's Salta and Tucumán provinces.

== Age ==
According to Francisco Bazán del Campo, the oldest huancas are approximately 5000 years old (from 4000 to 2000 BC), in the Late Precephalic, in places such as Caral and Bandurria.

== Meanings ==
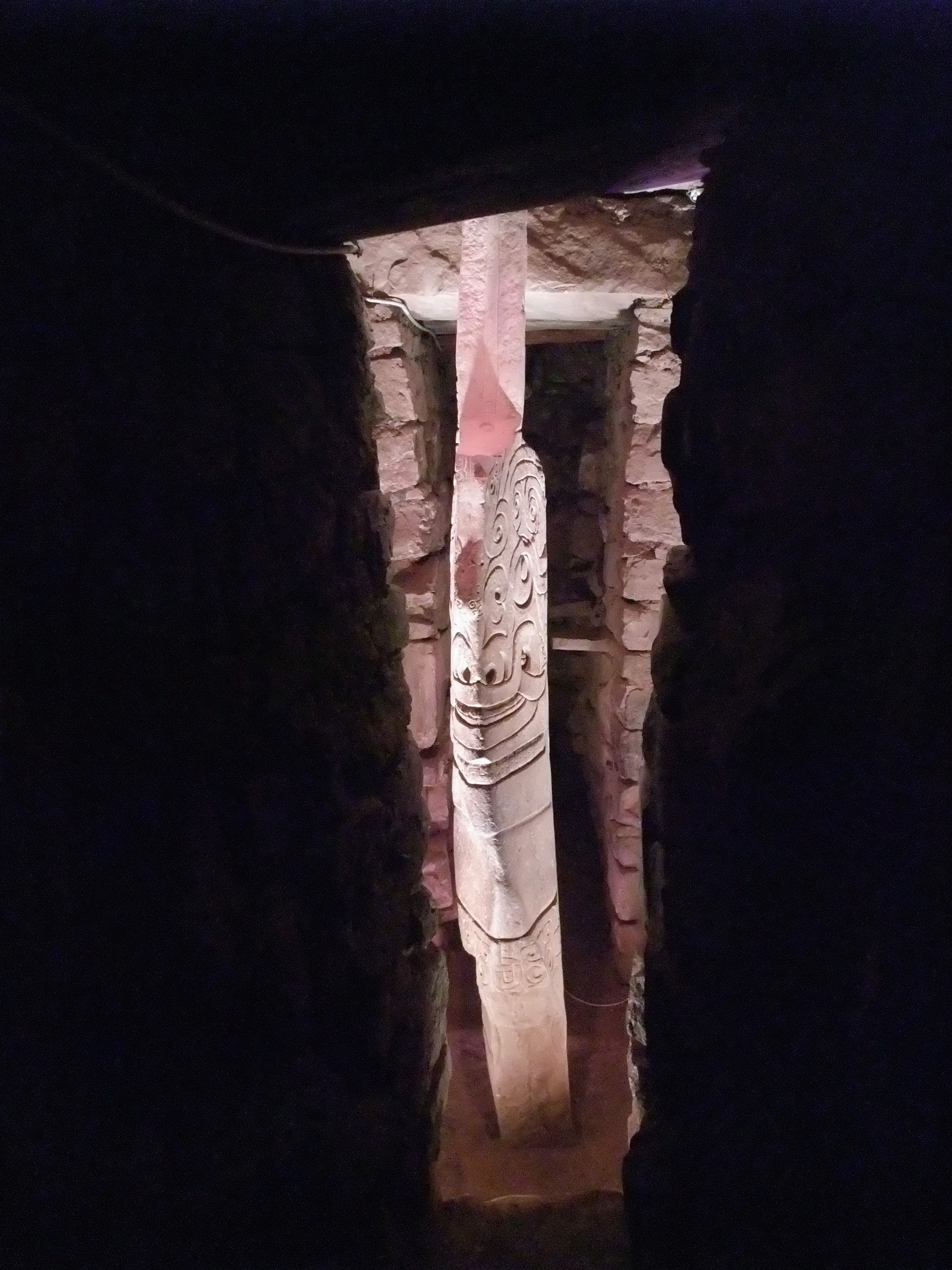
The huanca in the Ancient Temple of Chavín de Huántar, still positioned in a place that would adapt to the concept of axis mundi referred to by Mircea Eliade.

Colonial chronicles and idolatry removal documents give us an idea of the meanings of huancas in the original Andean world. Rodrigo Hernández Príncipe, an idolatry visitor who lived between 1578 and 1638, told of the existence of a huanca in early Colony in Peru in the Callejón de Huaylas area:

"... a un cuarto de legua desta población muy antigua donde en un adoratorio rodeado de cantería y en medio hecho un caracol estaba su respetada y principal Huanca llamada Llamoq que era una piedra al modo de una calavera tan pesada como fiera que mirarla ponia horror estaba rodeada de muchos sacrificios adoráanla con airjuas y trompetas estos llactas y era huaca e la madre del cacique y los deste ayllo dijeron proceder de esta huaca..."

— Hernandez Principe 1622

The term huaca today is popularly used to designate an archaeological site. However, according to ethnohistomical documents this concept referred to the sacrality of different things: stones, trees, places of nature, temples, people, animals and human experiences such as crying. Therefore, huancas are huacas: stones considered sacred to which rites and offerings were dedicated, had their own name and even indicated the place of origin of a community.

Likewise, according to a quote from another idolatry remover, the Spanish Jesuit Pablo José de Arriaga (who claimed to have destroyed 189 Huancas monoliths), who lived between 1564 and 1622, it follows that the stone represents the ancestors, who act as intermediaries between the terrestrial world and the divine world, and assist and complement the agricultural work by 'fertilising' the land.

"Chíchic o Huanca llaman una piedra larga, que suelen poner empinada en sus Chácaras, y la llaman también Chacrayoc, que es el Señor de la Chácara, porque piensan que aquella Chácra fué de aquella Huaca, y que tiene a cargo su augmento, y como tal la reverencian, y especialmente en tiempo de las sementeras le ofrecen sus sacrificios".

— Arriaga, 1621

The cult of huancas was an Andean manifestation of the cult of the ancestors, which are a set of universal religious practices centered on the ancestors under the belief that they continue to care for their descendants. In the Andean world, each collective or ayllu had its own ancestors, and in the greater rank of these the founding ancestor was positioned, often depicted in stone as a huanca. Since the Andean worldview is animistic, the hills, lagoons and stones have life and are therefore subjects of worship. Centuries later, according to current studies, other practices such as the cult of the Mallqui (momias) are incorporated in chullpas, such as in the necropolis of Marcajirca in the province of Huari in Peru.

== Types and Functions ==
Huancas are typed accordingly:

by morphology:

- By their individual shape: prismatic, rectangular, lanceolate, tabular, cubic, cylindrical and irregular.
- By their finish: smooth or tilled.
- By their arrangement: in parallel rows, circular wall with rubbers, platform with rubber and rubber with pedestal.
- Natural huancas: rocks and hills, and boulders (natural but moved).

By their function:

- Huancas of the peoples: the huancas called Marcayoc that symbolized the founding ancestor thus occupying a tutelar function.
- Huancas de las sementeras: Chacrayoc huancas, symbolizing fertility, increasing and protecting crops in the chakra.
- Huancas of the waters or heights: they are located near the lagoons and rivers, fulfilling a conducive role for abundance.
- Huancas of the roads: they are located at points on the roads that demarcate a beginning, an end or a high point, fulfilling a function similar to the Apaches and then to the Inca ushnus of the Late Horizon.
- Huancas of the temples: they are located in isolated temples or near the villages, in some cases the temple develops according to the cult of the huanca, as in Chavín de Huántar and in some buildings of sites such as Caral.

== Emblematic Huancas ==
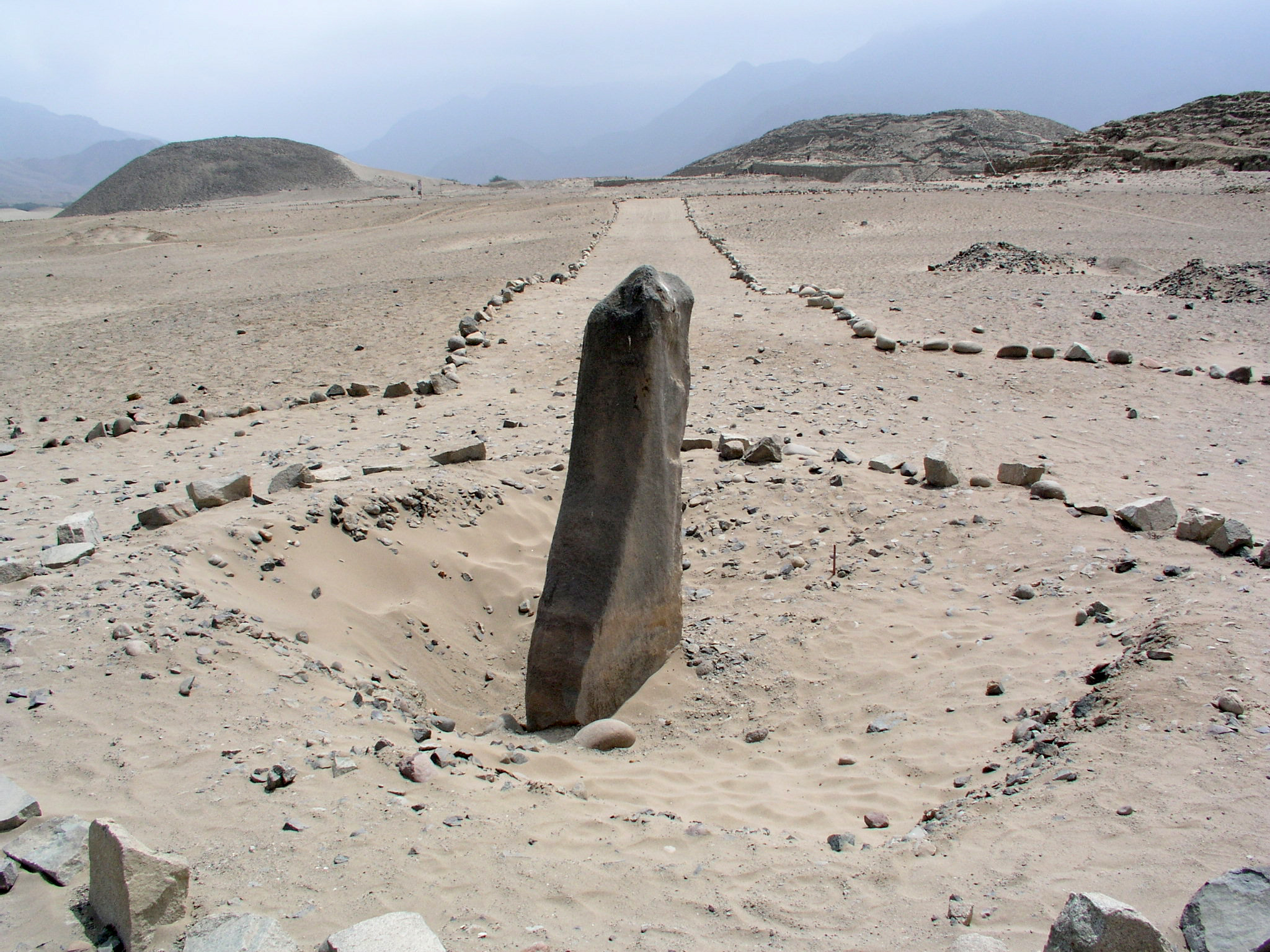
Huanca Stone in Caral.

La Huanca de Caral

Another important huanca is located in front of one of the pyramidal buildings of Caral, an archaeological site on the central north coast of Peru, in the district of Supe, Barranca Province. In the Plazuela de La Huanca, at the front of the facade of one of the pyramids (Pyramidal Building La Huanca, Sector I in Caral Alto) is precisely a swell on the ground and is 2.15 m high.

La Huanca de Chavín

The most emblematic huanca in the Andes of Peru is popularly known as the monolithic Lanzón, belonging to the archaeological Chavín culture that developed during the Early Horizon. It was the German explorer Ernst Wilhelm Middendorf who picked up the name huanca for perhaps the most important element of the Chavín de Huántar ceremonial center when he visited the village of the same name in the late nineteenth century.
