= Ludmila Vaňková =

Czech writer (1927–2022)

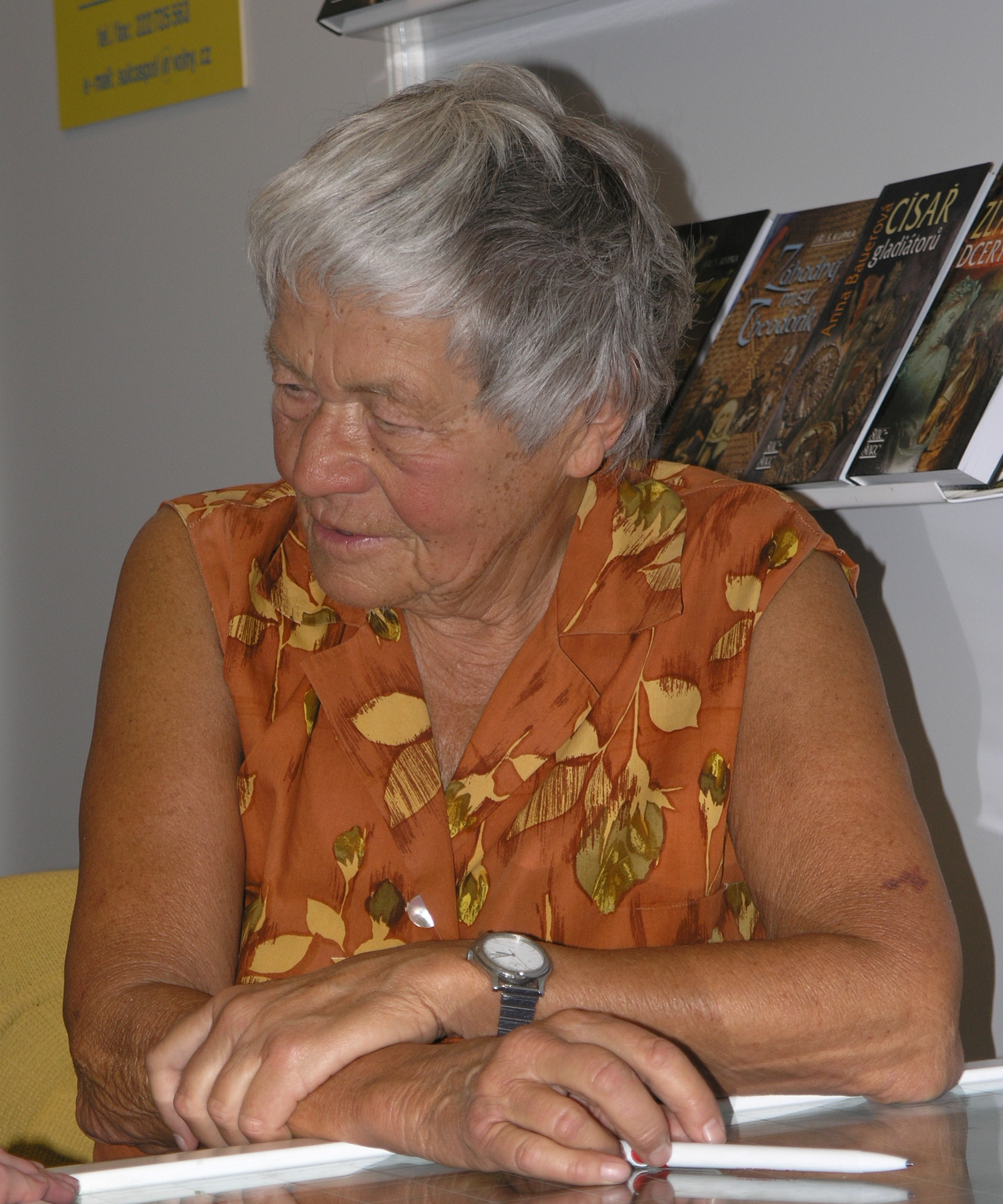
- Vaňková in 2009
- Born: 27 May 1927; Prague, Czechoslovakia
- Died: 3 February 2022 (aged 94)
- Citizenship: Czech Republic
- Education: Charles University
- Spouse: Josef Paukert

Ludmila Vaňková (27 May 1927 – 3 February 2022) was a Czech writer.

She is the author of the Lev a růže tetralogy (English: The Lion and the Rose). This consists of the novels Král železný, král zlatý (1977, reprinted 2002), Zlá léta (1978, reprinted 2002), Dědicové zlatého krále (1979, reprinted 2002), and Žebrák se stříbrnou holí (1995, reprinted 2002). She is also the author of Mosty pres propasti casu (1976) and Stříbrný jednorožec (1981).

Vaňková died in February 2022, at the age of 94.
