= Ronald G. Wanek =

American businessman

- Born: 1941 (age 84–85)
- Occupations: Founder and chairman, Ashley Furniture Industries
- Spouse: Joyce A. Wanek
- Children: 3 including Todd R. Wanek

Ronald G. Wanek (born 1941) is an American billionaire businessman, and the founder and chairman of Ashley Furniture Industries.

== Early life ==
Wanek grew up on a dairy farm in Minnesota, where his grandfather and great uncle built furniture as a hobby.

== Awards and honors ==
In 2015, Ronald G. Wanek received an honorary doctorate from High Point University during their commencement ceremony. In April 2026, Wanek ranked on Forbes' "Self-Made 250" list.

== Career ==
Wanek started his first manufacturing business, Arcadia Furniture, in 1970 with a loan from his father and money he got from selling his home.

In 1976, Wanek purchased Ashley Furniture, a company that had been operating since the 1940s. After taking control of the company, Wanek established overseas manufacturing and distribution capabilities to make the business more competitive.

== Political activity ==
In 2012, Wanek, "a prominent Republican donor", gave $1 million towards hosting Tampa's Republican National Convention.

Together with his spouse, Wanek contributed $839,400 to Donald Trump's 2020 presidential campaign.

== Personal life ==
He is married to Joyce; they have three children and live in St. Petersburg, Florida. His son Todd R. Wanek is the CEO of Ashley Furniture.

In 1998, Wanek and his wife Joyce started the Ronald & Joyce Wanek Foundation. The foundation donates to causes including children and families charities, medical research, education, arts and U.S. armed forces.
