= Todd R. Wanek =

American businessman

- Born: 16 March 1964 (age 61)
- Title: CEO, Ashley Furniture
- Term: 2002-
- Spouse: Married
- Children: 2
- Father: Ronald G. Wanek

Todd Ronald Wanek (born 16 March 1964) is an American billionaire businessman, the president and chief executive officer (CEO) of Ashley Furniture Industries, Inc. He is the son of Ronald G. Wanek, the chairman. As of May 2022, his net worth was estimated at US$3.1 billion.

He was named CEO in 2002. Later that year, minority shareholders in the company claimed that the Waneks were conspiring to force them out of the company.

Both he and his father have made financial contributions to political candidates and the political action committee associated with the American Furniture Manufacturers Association.

In 2006, he received the Spirit of Life award from the City of Hope cancer research center for his fundraising efforts.

In 2018, High Point University (HPU) named their new school of undergraduate sciences for Todd and Karen Wanek.

== Personal life ==
Wanek is married, with two children, and lives in St. Petersburg, Florida.
