= Wenzel =

Wenzel is a male given name (long version Wenzeslaus) as the German and Old English form of the Czech given name Václav or Venceslav, meaning "praised with glory". Variations are Вячеслав (Ukrainian and Russian), Vencel (Hungarian), Wacław, Więcław, Wiesław (Polish), Venceslas/Wenceslas (French), Venceslao (Italian), Venceslau (Portuguese), Wenceslao (Spanish).

== Given name ==
- Wenzel Jamnitzer (ca. 1507–1585), Austrian-German etcher and goldsmith
- Wenzel, Archduke of Austria (1561–1578), Austrian prince and Grand Prior of the Order of Malta
- Wenzel Anton Graf Kaunitz (1711–1794), Austrian statesman
- Wenzel Raimund Birck (1718–1763), Austrian composer
- Wenzel Parler (1333–1399), German-Bohemian architect
- Wenzel Pichl (1741–1805), Czech composer
- Wenzel Thomas Matiegka (1773–1830), Bohemian composer
- Prince Klemens Wenzel von Metternich (1773–1859), German-Austrian politician and statesman
- Wolfgang Wenzel von Haffner (1806–1892), Norwegian Minister of the Navy
- Wenzel Storch (born 1961), German film director and producer
- Josef Wenzel, Prince of Liechtenstein (1696–1772), prince of Liechtenstein
- Prince Joseph Wenzel of Liechtenstein (born 1995), oldest child of Prince Alois of Liechtenstein and his wife Princess Sophie of Bavaria, Duchess in Bavaria
- Franz Wenzel, Graf von Kaunitz-Rietberg, (1742–1825), Austrian general, son of Wenzel Anton Graf Kaunitz
- Wenzel Johann Tomaschek (1774–1850), Bohemian composer

== Surname ==
- Wenzel (surname)

== See also ==
- Wenzl (surname)
- Wentzel
- Wenzell Baird Bryant (1927–2008), American filmmaker
- Margaret Wenzell (born 1925), All-American Girls Professional Baseball League player
- Wenzel's, British bakery chain
