= Wenz =

Wenz may refer to:

== Broadcasting ==
- WENZ, a radio station (107.9 FM) licensed to Cleveland, Ohio, United States

== People ==
- Alfred Wenz (1919–1944), a German soldier
- Fred Wenz aka Frederick Charles Wenz (1941–2020), a baseball player
- Peter Wenz (born 1945), an Emeritus Professor of Philosophy at the University of Illinois at Springfield
- Wilhelm August Wenz (1886–1945), a German malacologist

== See also ==
- Latinxua Sin Wenz, a little-used romanization system for Mandarin Chinese.
- Wentz
- Wenzel
- Wentzel
