= Wenzel (surname) =

Wenzel is a surname, and may refer to:

- Andreas Wenzel (born 1958), Liechtenstein alpine skier
- Anna Wenzel (born 1980), Austrian figure skater
- Anne Wenzel (born 1972), German artist
- Benedetta Wenzel (born 1997), German field hockey player
- Bill Wenzel (1918–1987), American cartoonist
- Bob Wenzel (born 1949), American college basketball coach and broadcaster
- Brian Wenzel (1929–2024), Australian actor
- Carl Friedrich Wenzel (1740–1793), German chemist
- Carmen Wenzel (born 1931), Mexican sculptor and painter
- Charles Wenzel (born 1769), Lutheran missionary from Silesia
- Christian Helmut Wenzel, German philosopher
- Christine Wenzel (born 1981), German sport shooter
- Clemens Wenzel (born 1988), German rower
- David Wenzel (born 1950), American illustrator
- Dylan Wenzel-Halls (born 1997), Australian soccer player
- Eberhard Wenzel (1950–2001), German public health researcher
- Edgar Wenzel (1919–1980), German actor
- Gregg Wenzel (1969–2003), American intelligence officer
- Hanni Wenzel (born 1956), Liechtensteiner alpine skier
- Hans-Georg Wenzel (1945–1999), German geodesist and academic
- Hans Jürgen Wenzel (1939–2009), German composer
- Hartmut Wenzel (1947–2020), German coxswain
- Henrik Wenzel (born 1956), Danish engineer and academic
- Heinrich Wenzel (1855–1893), German orientalist
- Hugo Wenzel (1891–1940), German politician
- Hugo Salas Wenzel (1935–2021), Chilean general
- Jeff Wenzel (born 1963), American football player
- Joan Wenzel (born 1953), Canadian middle-distance runner
- Johann Wenzel (1902–1969), German Communist and GRU agent
- Johann Wenzel of Gallas (1669–1719), Bohemian diplomat
- Jörn Wenzel (born 2004), German bobsledder
- Joseph W. Wenzel (1933–2021), American academic rhetorician
- Jule Wenzel (born 1990), German politician
- Kaethe Katrin Wenzel (born 1972), German artist
- Kirsten Wenzel (born 1961), German rowing cox
- Leopold Wenzel (1847–1923), Italian conductor and composer
- Linda Wenzel (born 2000), German ISIL member
- Marian Wenzel (1932–2002), British artist and art historian
- Mats Wenzel (born 2002), Luxembourgish cyclist
- Nathan Wenzel (born 2003), American racing driver
- Osvaldo Wenzel (1911–1991), Chilean decathlete
- Paul Wenzel (1935–2022), American artist
- Peter Wenzel (alpine skier), Australian alpine skier
- Peter Wenzel (weightlifter) (born 1952), German weightlifter
- Petra Wenzel (born 1961), Liechtenstein alpine skier
- Ralph Wenzel (end) (1918–2001), American football player
- Ralph Wenzel (guard) (1943–2012), American football player
- Ramona Wenzel (born 1963), German diver
- René Wenzel (born 1960), Danish cyclist coach
- Rüdiger Wenzel (born 1953), German football player
- Rune Wenzel (1901–1977), Swedish footballer
- Sally Wenzel, American pulmonologist
- Stefan Wenzel (born 1962), German agricultural economist and politician
- Steve Wenzel (born 1946), American politician from Minnesota
- Tanja Wenzel (born 1978), German film and TV actress
- Timo Wenzel (born 1977), German footballer
- Tino Wenzel (born 1973), German sport shooter
- Walter Wenzel, American violinist
- Wolfgang Wenzel (canoeist) (born 1946), German canoe slalom racer
- Wolfgang Wenzel (sailor) (born 1952), German competitive sailor

== See also ==
- Wenzl (surname)
- Wentzel
- Wendel (surname)
