= Wentz =

Wentz is a surname. Notable people with the surname include:

- Barney Wentz, American football player
- Carson Wentz, American football player
- Earl Wentz, American composer and pianist
- Eiji Wentz, Japanese singer for the band WaT
- Elisabet Wentz-Janacek (1923–2014) Swedish author and composer
- Janet Wentz, American politician
- Joey Wentz, American baseball player
- Levi Wentz (born 2002), American football player
- Lewis Haines Wentz, American oil businessman
- Myron W. Wentz, American businessman
- Pete Wentz, American musician
- Siegfried Wentz, German athlete
- Zachary Wentz, American wrestler
- Walter Evans-Wentz, American anthropologist

== See also ==
- Wenz (disambiguation)
- Wenzel, Wentzel, Wenzl
