= Phonological history of English consonant clusters =

The phonological history of English includes various changes in the phonology of consonant clusters.

== H-cluster reductions ==
The H-cluster reductions are various consonant reductions that have occurred in the history of English, involving consonant clusters beginning with /h/ that have lost the /h/ (or become reduced to /h/) in some or all dialects.

=== Reductions of /hw/ ===
The cluster /hw/ (spelled ⟨wh⟩ since Middle English) has been subject to two kinds of reduction:

- Reduction to /h/ before /uː/ (due to /hw/ being perceived as a /h/ with the labialization characteristic of that environment). This occurred with the word how in the Old English period, and with who, whom and whose in Middle English (the latter words having had an unrounded vowel in Old English).
- Reduction to /w/, a development that has affected the speech of the great majority of English speakers, causing them to pronounce ⟨wh-⟩ the same as ⟨w-⟩ (sometimes called the wine–whine merger or glide cluster reduction). The distinction is maintained, however, in Scotland, most of Ireland, and some Southern American English.

=== Reduction of /hl/, /hr/ and /hn/ ===
The Old English consonant clusters /hl/, /hr/ and /hn/ were reduced to /l/, /r/, and /n/ in Middle English. For example, Old English hlāf, hring and hnutu become loaf, ring and nut in Modern English.

=== Reduction of /hj/ ===
In some dialects of English the cluster /hj/ is reduced to /j/, leading to pronunciations like /juːdʒ/ for huge and /ˈjuːmən/ for human, and making hew, hue, and Hugh homophones of ewe, yew, and you. This is sometimes considered a type of glide cluster reduction, but it is much less widespread than ⟨wh⟩-reduction, and is generally stigmatized where it is found. Aside from accents with general H-dropping, in the United States this reduction is mostly found in accents of Philadelphia and New York City; it also occurs in Cork accents of Irish English. In other dialects of English, hew and yew remain distinct; however, the cluster /hj/ of hew, human, etc. is often reduced from [çj] to just [ç] (a voiceless palatal fricative).

== Y-cluster reductions ==
Y-cluster reductions are reductions of clusters ending with the palatal approximant /j/, which is the sound of ⟨y⟩ in yes, and is sometimes referred to as "yod", from the Hebrew letter yod(h), which has the sound [j]. Many such clusters arose in dialects in which the falling diphthong /ɪu/ (the product of the merger of several Middle English vowel sequences) became the rising diphthong /juː/. (For more information, see Phonological history of English high back vowels.) They were thus often found before the vowel /uː/, as in cube /kjuːb/ – which was in some cases modified to /ʊə/ or /ʊ/ before (historical) /r/, as in cure, or weakened to /ʊ/ or /ə/ as in argument. They also occurred in words ending in -ion and -ious, such as nation and precious.

This change from /ɪu/ to /juː/, which had occurred in London by the end of the 17th century, did not take place in all dialects. A few dialects, notably in Wales, as well as in some parts of northern England, New England, and the American South, still retain a (falling) /ɪu/ diphthong where standard English has /juː/ – these dialects therefore lack the clusters with /j/ and have not been subject to the reductions described here.

The diphthongs /juː/ or /ɪʊ̯/ are most commonly indicated by the spellings ⟨eu⟩, ⟨ew⟩, ⟨uCV⟩ (where C is any consonant and V is any vowel), ⟨ue⟩ and ⟨ui⟩, as in feud, few, mute, cue and suit, while the historical monophthong /uː/ is commonly indicated by the spellings ⟨oo⟩ and ⟨ou⟩, as in moon and soup.

=== Yod-dropping ===
Yod-dropping is the elision of the /j/ from certain syllable-initial clusters of the type described above. Particular cases of yod-dropping may affect all or some of the dialects that have the relevant clusters.

The change of [ɪ] to [j] in these positions (as described above) produced some clusters which would have been difficult or impossible to pronounce, which led to what John Wells calls "early yod dropping" in which the [j] was elided in the following environments:

- After /ʃ, tʃ, dʒ/, for example chute /ʃuːt/, chew /tʃuː/, juice /dʒuːs/
- After /j/, for example yew /juː/ (compare [jɪʊ̯] in some conservative dialects)
- After /r/, for example rude /ruːd/
- After stop+/l/ clusters, for example blue /bluː/

The words you and yew in a dialect that was not subject to early yod-dropping
you, yew
[ju jɪʊ̯]

The previously mentioned accents that did not have the [ɪ]→[j] change were not subject to this process. Thus, for example, in much Welsh English pairs like chews/choose, yew/you and threw/through remain distinct: the first member of each pair has the diphthong /ɪʊ̯/, while the second member has /uː/:

- chews /tʃɪʊ̯z/, choose /tʃuːz/
- yew /jɪʊ̯/, you /juː/
- threw /θrɪʊ̯/, through /θruː/

Conversely, an initial /j/ does not appear in Welsh English before /iː/ in words such as yeast and yield.

Many varieties of English have extended yod-dropping to the following environments if the /j/ is in the same syllable as the preceding consonant:

- After /s/, for example suit /suːt/
- After /l/, for example lute /ˈluːt/
- After /z/, for example Zeus /ˈzuːs/
- After /θ/, for example enthuse /ɛnˈθuːz/

Yod-dropping in the above environments used to be considered nonstandard in England but now also occurs by educated RP-speakers. (The /j/ after /s/ is not normally dropped in RP in medial positions, however: compare pursuit /pəˈsjuːt/.) In General American, yod-dropping is found not only in the above environments but also after /t/, /d/ and /n/ (for example, tune /ˈtuːn/, dew /ˈduː/, and new /ˈnuː/).

The lack of yod-dropping in those contexts has occasionally been held to be a shibboleth distinguishing Canadians from Americans. However, in a survey conducted in the Golden Horseshoe area of Southern Ontario in 1994, over 80% of respondents under the age of 40 pronounced student and news without yod.

The areas marked in pink show where in the United States a distinction between /ɪʊ̯/ in dew and /u/ in do may be made.

General American thus undergoes yod-dropping after all alveolar consonants. A few accents of American English, such as working-class Southern American English, however, preserve the distinction in pairs like do/dew because, like in the Welsh English dialects discussed above, they retain a diphthong /ɪʊ̯/ in words in which RP has /juː/: /lut~lɪʊ̯t/, /du~dɪʊ̯/, etc.

However, in words like annual, menu, volume, Matthew, continue, etc., with a syllable break before the /j/, there is no yod-dropping. The same applies accordingly to British and other accents; the yod is often dropped after initial /l/, for example, but it is not dropped in words like volume or value. (British speakers omit the /j/ in figure, but most Americans retain it.)

Additionally, there is no /j/ in British pronunciations of coupon and Pulitzer, /ˈkuːpɒn/ and /ˈpʊlɪtsə/ respectively, but many American speakers keep the yod, realizing them as /ˈkjuːpɒn/ and /ˈpjuːlɪtsər/, although Pulitzer with the pew sound is widely incorrect.

In New Zealand and to some extent Australian English, debut is mainly pronounced without the yod as /ˈdæebʉː/.

Yod-dropping after /t/, /d/, and /n/ was also a traditional feature of Cockney speech, which continues to be the case after /n/, but now, after /t/ and /d/, yod-coalescence is now more common.

Some East Anglian accents such as Norfolk dialect extend yod-dropping not only to the position after /t/, /d/ or /n/ but also to the position after nonalveolar consonants as well: pairs like beauty/booty, mute/moot, cute/coot can then be homophonous. A well-known series of British television advertisements beginning in the 1980s featured Bernard Matthews, who was from Norfolk and described his turkeys as "bootiful" (for beautiful). Such accents pronounce a /j/ in words like "use", "unit", etc. only if there is no consonant before the /j/.

Homophonous pairs after j, r, ʃ, and tʃ
/ɪʊ̯/	/uː/	IPA	Notes
brewed	brood	ˈbruːd	
brume	broom	ˈbruːm	
chews	choose	ˈtʃuːz	
chute	shoot	ˈʃuːt	
drupe	droop	ˈdruːp	
rheum	room	ˈruːm	
rude	rood	ˈruːd	
rue	roo	ˈruː	
ruse	roos	ˈruːz	
threw	through	ˈθruː	
yew	you	ˈjuː	
yule	you'll	ˈjuːl	

Homophonous pairs after l and s
/ɪʊ̯/	/uː/	IPA	Notes
Blume	bloom	ˈbluːm	
glume	gloom	ˈgluːm	
Lewis	Louis	ˈluːɪs	
lieu	loo	ˈluː	
lieu	Lou	ˈluː	
Luke	look	ˈluːk	With foot–goose merger.
lune	loon	ˈluːn	
lute	loot	ˈluːt	
slew	slough	ˈsluː	
slue	slough	ˈsluː	
sue	Sioux	ˈsuː	
suit	soot	ˈsuːt	With foot–goose merger.

Homophonous pairs after d, n, and t
/ɪʊ̯/	/uː/	IPA	Notes
adieu	ado	əˈduː	
dew	do	ˈduː	
Dewar	doer	ˈduːər	
due	do	ˈduː	
dune	Doon	ˈduːn	
knew	nu	ˈnuː	
new	nu	ˈnuː	
tune	toon	ˈtuːn	

Homophonous pairs after other consonants
/ɪʊ̯/	/uː/	IPA	Notes
beaut	boot	ˈbuːt	
beauty	booty	ˈbuːti	
butte	boot	ˈbuːt	
cue	coo	ˈkuː	
cute	coot	ˈkuːt	
feud	food	ˈfuːd	
few	foo	ˈfuː	
fuel	fool	ˈfuːl	With vile–vial merger.
hew	who	ˈhuː	
hews	who's	ˈhuːz	
hews	whose	ˈhuːz	
hue	who	ˈhuː	
hues	who's	ˈhuːz	
hues	whose	ˈhuːz	
Hugh	who	ˈhuː	
Hughes	who's	ˈhuːz	
Hughes	whose	ˈhuːz	
Kew	coo	ˈkuː	
kyu	coo	ˈkuː	
mew	moo	ˈmuː	
mew	moue	ˈmuː	
mewed	mood	ˈmuːd	
muse	moos	ˈmuːz	
muse	moues	ˈmuːz	
mute	moot	ˈmuːt	
pew	poo	ˈpuː	
pule	pool	ˈpuːl	
pure	poor	ˈpʊə(r)	
Q; cue	coo	ˈkuː	
que	coo	ˈkuː	
queue	coo	ˈkuː	

=== Yod-coalescence ===
Yod-coalescence is a process that fuses the clusters /dj, tj, sj, zj/ into the sibilants [dʒ, tʃ, ʃ, ʒ] respectively (for the meanings of those symbols, see English phonology). The first two are examples of affrication.

Unlike yod-dropping, yod-coalescence frequently occurs with clusters that would be considered to span a syllable boundary and so commonly occurs before unstressed syllables. For example, in educate, the /dj/ cluster would not usually be subject to yod-dropping in General American, as the /d/ is assigned to the previous syllable, but it commonly coalesces to [dʒ]. Here are a few examples of yod-coalescence universal in all English dialects:

- /tj/ → [tʃ] in most words ending -ture, such as nature [ˈneɪtʃəɹ]
- /dj/ → [dʒ] in soldier [ˈsoʊldʒəɹ]
- /sj/ → [ʃ] in words ending with -ssure such as pressure [ˈpɹɛʃəɹ] (also in words ending with consonant+sure, consonant+sion, -tion)
- /zj/ → [ʒ] in words ending vowel+sure such as measure [ˈmɛʒəɹ] (also vowel+sion, r+sion)

In some other words, the coalesced pronunciation is common in English dialects around the world, but an older non-coalesced form still exists among some speakers of Received Pronunciation (RP):

- educate [ˈɛdʒʊkeɪt] (also in RP: [ˈɛdjʊkeɪt])
- azure [ˈæʒʊɚ] (also in RP [ˈæzjʊə])
- issue [ˈɪʃuː] (also in RP [ˈɪsjuː]), the intermediate form [ˈɪʃjuː] being also common

Coalescence can even occur across word boundaries, as in the colloquial "gotcha" /ˈɡɒtʃə/ (for got you /ˈɡɒtju/) and "whatcha" /ˈwɒtʃə/ (for what're you /ˈwɒtərjə/).

In certain English accents, yod-coalescence also occurs in stressed syllables, as in tune and dune. That occurs in Australian, Cockney, Estuary English, Zimbabwean English, Newfoundland English, South African English, and to a certain extent in New Zealand English, Scottish English, Hiberno-English, RP, and even some Asian varieties of English, like Philippine English (for many speakers, because of the influence of the phonology of their mother languages). This results in pronunciations such as the following:

- dew/due [dʒuː] (traditional RP: [djuː])
- tune [tʃuːn] (traditional RP: [tjuːn])

In certain varieties such as Australian, Ugandan, and some RP, stressed [sj, zj] can also coalesce:

- resume [ɹəˈʒuːm] (RP: [ɹɪˈzjuːm])
- assume [əˈʃuːm] (RP: [əˈsjuːm])

That can lead to additional homophony; for instance, dew and due come to be pronounced the same as Jew.

Yod-coalescence has traditionally been resisted in Received Pronunciation. It has certainly become established in words of the first group listed above (nature, soldier etc.) as well as in those of the second group (educate, azure etc.). It also generally occurs in those of the third group (dew, tune etc.).

In the table below, /Cj/ denotes a historical consonant + yod pair (such as /sj/ or /dj/), while /Ç/ denotes a consonant that was already palatal(ised) (such as /ʃ/ or /d͡ʒ/).

Homophonous pairs
/Cj/	/Ç/	IPA	Notes
deuce	juice	ˈdʒuːs	
dew, due	Jew	ˈdʒuː	
dewed	Jude	ˈdʒuːd	
dual, duel	jewel	ˈdʒuːəl	
duke	juke	ˈdʒuːk	
duly	Julie	ˈdʒuːli	
dune	June	ˈdʒuːn	
duty	Judy	ˈdʒuːɾi	With intervocalic alveolar flapping.
sue	shoe, shoo	ˈʃuː	This pronunciation of sue can be considered dated.
suit	shoot, chute	ˈʃuːt	This pronunciation of suit can be considered dated.
-tude	chewed	ˈtʃuːd	

== Other initial cluster reductions ==
=== Reduction of /wr/ and /wl/ ===
Old and Middle English had an initial /wr/ cluster (/r/ does not denote [ɹ] here), hence the spelling of words like write and wrong. This was reduced to just /r/, apparently during the 17th century. An intermediate stage may have been an [r] with lip rounding.

As a result of this reduction, pairs of words like rap and wrap, rite and write, etc. are homophones in practically all varieties of Modern English. They remain distinct in the Doric dialect of Scots, where the wr- cluster is pronounced /vr/. Alexander John Ellis reported distinctions between wr and r in Cumbria and in several varieties of Scots in the nineteenth century.

Old English also had a cluster /wl/, which reduced to /l/ during Middle English. For example, the word lisp derives from Old English wlisp(ian).

=== Reduction of /kn/ ===
Middle English initial /kn/ is reduced in modern English to /n/, making pairs like knot/not and knight/night homophones.

The /kn/ cluster was spelled cn- in Old English; this changed to kn- in Middle English, and this spelling survives in Modern English, despite the loss of the /k/ sound. Cognates in other Germanic languages usually still sound the initial /k/. For example, the Old English ancestor of knee was cnēo, pronounced /kneːo̯/, and the cognate word in Modern German is Knie, pronounced /kniː/.

Most dialects of English reduced the initial cluster /kn/ to /n/ relatively recently; the change seems to have taken place in educated English during the 17th century. Several German-language grammars of English from the late 17th and early 18th centuries transcribed English kn- as tn-, dn-, implying that a stage of assimilation (or perhaps debuccalization to /ʔn/) preceded that of complete reduction.

The cluster is preserved in some Scots dialects, and Alexander John Ellis recorded it in parts of the Northern English counties in the late nineteenth century.

=== Reduction of /ɡn/ ===
The Middle English initial cluster /ɡn/ is reduced to /n/ in Modern English. Like the reduction of /kn/, this seems to have taken place during the seventeenth century. The change affected words like gnat, gnostic, gnome, etc., the spelling with gn- being retained despite the loss of the /ɡ/ sound. The cluster is preserved in some Scots dialects.

The song "The Gnu" jokes about this silent g and other silent letters in English. In fact the g in gnu may always have been silent in English, since this loanword did not enter the language until the late 18th century. The trumpeter Kenny Wheeler wrote a composition titled Gnu High, a pun on "new high".

=== S-cluster reductions ===
In some types of Caribbean English, the initial clusters /sp/, /st/, and /sk/ are reduced by the loss of /s/. The following stop is then subject to regular aspiration (or devoicing of the following approximant) in its new word-initial environment. Some examples of such pronunciations are:

Word		Pronunciation	
Original	Reduced	Original	Reduced
spit	→ pit	[ˈspɪt]	→ [ˈpʰɪt]
stomach	→ tomach	[ˈstʌmək]	→ [ˈtʰʌmək]
spend	→ pen	[ˈspɛnd]	→ [ˈpʰɛn] (also affected by final cluster reduction)
squeeze	→ queeze	[ˈskwiːz]	→ [ˈkʰw̥iːz]

According to Wells, these reductions occur only in the broadest creole.

== Final cluster reductions ==
=== NG-coalescence ===
NG-coalescence is a historical sound change by which the final cluster /nɡ/, pronounced [ŋɡ] (the /n/ being realized as a velar nasal by assimilation with the velar /ɡ/), came to be pronounced as just [ŋ] – that is, the final [ɡ] was dropped, but the velar quality of the nasal remained. The change took place in educated London speech around the end of the 16th century, and explains why there is no [ɡ] sound at the end of words like fang, sing, wrong and tongue in the standard varieties of Modern English.

The change applies not only at the end of a word, but generally at the end of a morpheme. If a word ending in -ng is followed by a suffix or is compounded with another word, the [ŋ] pronunciation normally remains. For example, in the words fangs, sings, singing, singer, wronged, wrongly, hangman, there is no [ɡ] sound. An exception is the comparative and superlative forms of adjectives: in the words longer/longest, stronger/strongest, younger/youngest, the [ɡ] is pronounced in most accents. The pronunciation with [ɡ] is thus possible only before a vowel; before a consonant, the only possibility is a bare [ŋ].

In other cases (when it is not morpheme-final), word-internal -ng- does not show the effects of coalescence, and the pronunciation [ŋɡ] is retained, as in finger and angle. This means that the words finger and singer do not rhyme in most modern varieties of English, although they did in Middle English. The process of NG-coalescence might therefore be referred to as the singer–finger split.

Pronunciation of ⟨ng⟩ in the word tongue in various regional dialects of England

Some accents, however, do not show the full effects of NG-coalescence as described above. In these accents, sing may be found with [ŋɡ], and singer may rhyme with finger. This is particularly associated with English English accents in areas such as Lancashire, the West Midlands and Derbyshire, and is also present in north-east varieties of Welsh English. This includes the cities of Birmingham (see Brummie), Manchester (see Manchester dialect), Liverpool (see Scouse), Sheffield and Stoke-on-Trent (see Potteries dialect). This also occurred in a small area of eastern Kent at the time of the Survey of English Dialects.

It is also associated with some American English accents in the New York City area.

On the other hand, in some accents of the west of Scotland and Ulster, NG-coalescence is extended to morpheme-internal position, so that finger is pronounced /ˈfɪŋər/ (cf. Dutch vinger /ˈvɪŋər/), thus rhyming with singer (although the [ɡ] is not dropped before a stressed syllable, as in engage).

It is because of NG-coalescence that /ŋ/ is now normally regarded one of the phonemes of standard English. In Middle English, the [ŋ] can be regarded as an allophone of /n/, occurring before velar consonants, but in Modern English, in view of minimal pairs such as pan–pang and sin–sing, that analysis no longer appears to hold. Nevertheless, some linguists (particularly generativists) do regard a word like sing as being underlyingly /sɪnɡ/, positing a rule that deletes [ɡ] after a nasal before a morpheme boundary, after the nasal has undergone assimilation. A problem with this view is that there are a few words in which [ŋ] is followed neither by a velar nor a morpheme boundary (such as gingham, dinghy, orangutan and Singapore, for those speakers who pronounce them without [ɡ]), and some in which the [ɡ] is not deleted before a morpheme boundary (such as longer, stronger, younger noted above). In the case of longer, a minimal pair occurs for some speakers between /lɒŋɡə(r)/ (comparative form of the adjective long) and /lɒŋə(r)/ ("someone who longs"; agent noun of the verb long).

The above-mentioned accents which lack NG-coalescence may more easily be analyzed as lacking a phoneme /ŋ/. The same may apply to those where NG-coalescence is extended to morpheme-internal position, since here a more consistent [ɡ]-deletion rule can be formulated.

=== G-dropping ===
G-dropping is a popular name for the feature of speech whereby /n/ is used in place of the standard /ŋ/ in weak syllables. This applies especially to the -ing ending of verbs, but also in other words such as morning, nothing, ceiling, Buckingham, etc. G-dropping speakers may pronounce this syllable as [ɪn] or [ən] (reducing to a syllabic [n] in some cases), while non-G-dropping speakers have /ɪŋ/ (/əŋ/ with the weak vowel merger) or /iŋ/.

Relative to the great majority of modern dialects, which have NG-coalescence, G-dropping does not involve the dropping of any sound, simply the replacement of the velar nasal with the alveolar nasal. The name derives from the apparent orthographic consequence of replacing the sound written ⟨ng⟩ with that normally written ⟨n⟩. The spelling -in' is sometimes used to indicate that a speaker uses the G-dropping pronunciation, as in makin' for making.

The pronunciation with /n/ rather than /ŋ/ is a long-established one. Old English verbs had a present participle in -ende and a verbal noun (gerund) form in -ing(e). These merged into a single form, written -ing, but not necessarily spoken as such – the /n/ pronunciation may be inherited from the former distinct present participle form. The /n/ variant appears to have been fashionable generally during the 18th century, with the alternative /ɪŋ/ being adopted in educated speech around the 1820s, possibly as a spelling pronunciation.

Today, G-dropping is a feature of colloquial and non-standard speech of all regions, including stereotypically of Cockney, Southern American English and African American Vernacular English. Its use is highly correlated with the socioeconomic class of the speaker, with speakers of lower classes using /n/ with greater frequency. It has also been found to be more common among men than women, and less common in more formal styles of speech.

The fact that the /n/ pronunciation was formerly associated with certain upper-class speech is reflected in the phrase huntin', shootin' and fishin' (used in referring to country gentry who frequently engaged in such field sports). Further evidence that this pronunciation was once standard comes from old rhymes, as in this couplet from John Gay's 1732 pastoral Acis and Galatea, set to music by Handel:

Shepherd, what art thou pursuing,
Heedless running to thy ruin?

which was presumably pronounced "shepherd, what art thou pursuin', heedless runnin' to thy ruin", although this would sound very odd in an opera today. Similarly, in the poetry of Jonathan Swift (1667–1745), -ing forms consistently rhyme with words ending in /ɪn/, as in this verse of A Ballad on the Game of Traffic, where "lining" rhymes with "fine in":

But Weston has a new-cast gown
On Sundays to be fine in,
And, if she can but win a crown,
'Twill just new dye the lining.

=== Reduction of /mb/ and /mn/ ===
In later Middle English, the final cluster /mb/ was reduced to just /m/ (the plum-plumb merger). This affects words such as lamb and plumb, as well as derived forms with suffixes, such as lambs, lambing, plumbed, plumber.

By analogy with words like these, certain other words ending in /m/, which had no historical /b/ sound, had a silent letter ⟨b⟩ added to their spelling by way of hypercorrection. Such words include limb and crumb.

Where the final cluster /mn/ occurred, this was reduced to /m/ (the him-hymn merger), as in column, autumn, damn, solemn. (Compare French automne, where the cluster has been reduced to /n/.) Both sounds are nonetheless still pronounced before vowels in certain derivatives, such as columnar, autumnal, damnation, solemnity.

=== Generalized final cluster reduction ===
General reduction of final consonant clusters occurs in African American Vernacular English and Caribbean English. It also appears in the Local Dublin English. The new final consonant may be slightly lengthened as an effect.

Examples are:

Word		Pronunciation	
Standard	Reduced	Standard	Reduced
test	→ tes'	[tɛst]	→ [tɛs(ˑ)]
desk	→ des'	[dɛsk]	→ [dɛs(ˑ)]
hand	→ han'	[hænd]	→ [hæn(ˑ)]
send	→ sen'	[sɛnd]	→ [sɛn(ˑ)]
left	→ lef'	[lɛft]	→ [lɛf(ˑ)]
wasp	→ was'	[wɒsp]	→ [wɒs(ˑ)]

The plurals of test and desk may become tesses and desses by the same rule that gives plural messes from singular mess.

== Medial cluster reductions ==
When a consonant cluster ending in a stop is followed by another consonant or cluster in the next syllable, the final stop in the first syllable is often elided. This may happen within words or across word boundaries. Examples of stops that will often be elided in this way include the [t] in postman and the [d] in cold cuts or band saw.

Historically, similar reductions have taken place before syllabic consonants in certain words, leading to the silent ⟨t⟩ in words like castle and listen. This change took place around the 17th century. In the word often, the [t] sound later came to be re-inserted by some speakers as a spelling pronunciation.

An earlier reduction that took place in early Middle English was the change of /ts/ to /s/ (the sent-cent merger). This led to the modern sound of soft ⟨c⟩.

== Consonant insertions ==
=== Prince–prints merger ===
For many speakers, an epenthetic [t] is inserted in the final cluster /ns/, making it identical or very similar to the cluster /nts/. For example, the words prince and prints have come to be homophones or nearly so.

The epenthesis is a natural consequence of the transition from the nasal [n] to the fricative [s]; if the raising of the soft palate (which converts a nasal to an oral sound) is completed before the release of the tongue tip (which enables a fricative sound), an intervening stop [t] naturally results. The merger of /ns/ and /nts/ is not necessarily complete, however; the duration of the epenthetic [t] in /ns/ has been found to be often shorter (and the [n] longer) than in the underlying cluster /nts/. Some speakers preserve a clearer distinction, with prince having [ns], and prints having [nts] or [nʔs]. The epenthesis does not occur between syllables, in words like consider.

=== Other insertions ===
The merger of /nz/ and /ndz/ is also possible, making bans and pens sound like bands and pends. However, this is less common than the merger of /ns/ and /nts/ described above, and in rapid speech may involve the elision of the /d/ from /ndz/ rather than epenthesis in /nz/.

Epenthesis of a stop between a nasal and a fricative can also occur in other environments, for example:

- /nθ/ may become /ntθ/ (so epenthesis becomes epentthesis)
- /nʃ/ may become /ntʃ/ (so pinscher is often pronounced like pincher)
- /ms/ may become /mps/ (so Samson becomes "Sampson", hamster becomes "hampster")
- /ŋs/ may become /ŋks/ (so Kingston becomes "kinkston")

Epenthesis may also happen in the cluster /ls/, which then becomes /lts/, so else rhymes with belts.

An epenthetic [p] often intervenes in the cluster /mt/ in the word dreamt, making it rhyme with attempt.

Some originally epenthetic consonants have become part of the established pronunciation of words. This applies, for instance, to the /b/ in words like thimble, grumble and scramble.

For the insertion of glottal stops before certain consonants, see Glottalization below.

Homophonous pairs
fricative	affricate	IPA	Notes
Aaron's	errands	ˈɛrən(d)z	With Mary-marry-merry merger.
-ance	-ants	-ən(t)s	
ANSI	antsy	ˈæn(t)si	
bans	bands	ˈbæn(d)z	
Ben's	bends	ˈbɛn(d)z	
bines	binds	ˈbaɪn(d)z	
brans	brands	ˈbræn(d)z	
bunce	bunts	ˈbʌn(t)s	
Bynes	binds	ˈbaɪn(d)z	
chance	chants	ˈtʃæn(t)s, ˈtʃɑːn(t)s	
dense	dents	ˈdɛn(t)s	
dense	dints	ˈdɪn(t)s	With pen-pin merger.
-ence	-ents	-ən(t)s	
Erin's	errands	ˈɛrən(d)z	With weak vowel merger.
fines	finds	ˈfaɪn(d)z	
fens	fends	ˈfɛn(d)z	
Finns	fends	ˈfɪn(d)z	With pen-pin merger.
fins	fends	ˈfɪn(d)z	With pen-pin merger.
glans	glands	ˈɡlæn(d)z	
Hans	hands	ˈhæn(d)z	Hans may also be pronounced /ˈhɑːnz/ or /ˈhɑːns/.
Heinz	hinds	ˈhaɪn(d)z	Heinz may also be pronounced /ˈhaɪnts/.
hence	hints	ˈhɪn(t)s	With pen-pin merger.
Hines	hinds	ˈhaɪn(d)z	
inns	ends	ˈɪn(d)z	With pen-pin merger.
ins	ends	ˈɪn(d)z	With pen-pin merger.
intense	intents	ɪnˈtɛn(t)s	
Kines	kinds	ˈkaɪn(d)z	
LANs	lands	ˈlæn(d)z	
lens	lends	ˈlɛn(d)z	
men's	mends	ˈmɛn(d)z	
mince	mints	ˈmɪn(t)s	
mines	minds	ˈmaɪn(d)z	
N's; ens	ends	ˈɛn(d)z	
patience	patients	ˈpeɪʃən(t)s	
pawns	ponds	ˈpɑn(d)z	With cot-caught merger.
pens	pends	ˈpɛn(d)z	
pins	pends	ˈpɪn(d)z	With pen-pin merger.
ponce	ponts	ˈpɑn(t)s	
pons	ponds	ˈpɑn(d)z	
presence	presents	ˈprɛzən(t)s	
prince	prints	ˈprɪn(t)s	
rinse	rents	ˈrɪn(t)s	With pen-pin merger.
sans	sands	ˈsæn(d)z	
sense	cents	ˈsɛn(t)s	
sense	scents	ˈsɛn(t)s	
since	cents	ˈsɪn(t)s	With pen-pin merger.
since	scents	ˈsɪn(t)s	With pen-pin merger.
spins	spends	ˈspɪn(d)z	With pen-pin merger.
Stan's	stands	ˈstæn(d)z	
tens	tends	ˈtɛn(d)z	
tense	tents	ˈtɛn(t)s	
tense	tints	ˈtɪn(t)s	With pen-pin merger.
tins	tends	ˈtɪn(d)z	With pen-pin merger.
Vince	vents	ˈvɪn(t)s	With pen-pin merger.
wans	wands	ˈwɑn(d)z	
wens	wends	ˈwɛn(d)z	
wens	winds (n.)	ˈwɪn(d)z	With pen-pin merger.
wince	Wentz	ˈwɪn(t)s	With pen-pin merger.
whence	Wentz	ˈwɪn(t)s	With wine-whine merger.
whines	winds (v.)	ˈwaɪn(d)z	With wine-whine merger.
wines	winds (v.)	ˈwaɪn(d)z	
wins	wends	ˈwɪn(d)z	With pen-pin merger.
wins	winds (n.)	ˈwɪn(d)z	
wyns, wynns	wends	ˈwɪn(d)z	With pen-pin merger.
wyns, wynns	winds (n.)	ˈwɪn(d)z	

== Alterations of clusters ==
=== Assimilation ===
In English as in other languages, assimilation of adjacent consonants is common, particularly of a nasal with a following consonant. This can occur within or between words. For example, the /n/ in encase is often pronounced [ŋ] (becoming a velar nasal by way of assimilation with the following velar stop /k/), and the /n/ in ten men likely becomes [m], assimilating with the following bilabial nasal /m/. Other cases of assimilation also occur, such as pronunciation of the /d/ in bad boy as [b]. Voicing assimilation determines the sound of the endings -s (as in plurals, possessives and verb forms) and -ed (in verb forms): these are voiced ([z], [d]) following a voiced consonant (or vowel), but voiceless ([s], [t]) after a voiceless consonant, as in gets, knocked.

=== Glottalization ===
While there are many accents (such as Cockney) in which syllable-final /t/ is frequently glottalized (realized as a glottal stop, [ʔ]) regardless of what follows it, the glottaling of /t/ in clusters is a feature even of standard accents, such as RP. There, [ʔ] may be heard for /t/ in such words and phrases as quite good, quite nice, nights. More precisely, it occurs in RP when /t/ appears in the syllable coda, is preceded by a vowel, liquid or nasal, and it is followed by another consonant except (normally) a liquid or semivowel in the same word, as in mattress.

Another possibility is pre-glottalization (or glottal reinforcement), where a glottal stop is inserted before a syllable-final stop, rather than replacing it. That can happen before /p/, /t/ and /k/ or also before the affricate /tʃ/. It can occur in RP in the same environments as those mentioned above, without the final restriction so a glottal stop may appear before the /t/, as in mattress. It can also occur before a pause as in quite! spoken alone but not in quite easy. In the case of /tʃ/, pre-glottalization is common even before a vowel, as in teacher.

According to Wells, this pre-glottalization originated in the 20th century (at least, it was not recorded until then). Glottalization of /t/ spread rapidly during the 20th century.

=== S-cluster metathesis ===
Final consonant clusters starting with /s/ sometimes undergo metathesis, meaning that the order of the consonants is switched. For example, the word ask may be pronounced like "ax", with the /k/ and the /s/ switched.

This example has a long history: the Old English verb áscian also appeared as acsian, and both forms continued into Middle English, the latter, metathesizing to "ask". The form axe appears in Chaucer: "I axe, why the fyfte man Was nought housband to the Samaritan?" (Wife of Bath's Prologue, 1386), and was considered acceptable in literary English until about 1600. It persists in some dialects of rural England as well as in Ulster Scots as /ˈaks/, and in Jamaican English as /ˈaːks/, from where it has entered London English as /ˈɑːks/.

S-cluster metathesis has been observed in some forms of African American Vernacular English, although it is not universal, one of the most stigmatized features of AAVE and often commented on by teachers. Examples of possible AAVE pronunciations include:

Word	Pronunciation
ask	→ /ˈæks/
grasp	→ /ˈɡræps/
wasp	→ /ˈwɑps/
gasp	→ /ˈɡæps/

=== Merger of /str/ and /skr/ ===
For some speakers of African American Vernacular English, the consonant cluster /str/ is pronounced as /skr/. For example, the word street may be pronounced as /skrit/.

The form has been found to occur in Gullah and in the speech of some young African Americans born in the Southern United States. It is reported to be a highly stigmatized feature, with children who use it often being referred to speech pathologists.

=== Yod-rhotacization ===
Yod-rhotacization is a process that occurs for some Memphis AAVE speakers, where /j/ is rhotacized to [r] in consonant clusters, causing pronunciations like:

Word	Pronunciation
beautiful	→ [ˈbruɾɪfl̩]
cute	→ [krut]
music	→ [ˈmruzɪk]

Compare yod-dropping and yod-coalescence, described above (and also the coil–curl merger, which features the reverse process, /r/ → /j/).

== See also ==
- Phonological history of English
- Phonological history of English consonants
- Phonological history of English fricatives and affricates
- H-dropping
