= Wenzl =

Wenzl may refer to:

- Wenzl (surname)
- Birman–Wenzl algebra, family of algebras
