= Venskus =

- Lithuanian surname
- m.: Venskus
- f.: (unmarried): Venskutė
- f.: (married): Venskuvienė, Venskienė
- Related names: Venckus

Venskus is a Lithuanian surname, a shortened Lithuanian translation of the Polish name, Wenceslaus. Notable people with the surname include:

- Adolfas Venskus (1924–2007), Lithuania-born chemist, expatriate activist, diplomat
- Erikas Venskus (born 2000), Lithuanian basketball player

== See also ==
- Wenskus
