= Ventsislav =

Ventsislav (Bulgarian: Венцислав) is a Bulgarian-language masculine given name. The feminine form is Ventsislava (Bulgarian: Венцислава). It is a variant of the name Wenceslaus, meaning "great glory". The name day for this name in Bulgaria is 27 December.

== People ==
- Ventsislav Aydarski (Bulgarian: Венцислав Айдарски: born 17 February 1991), Bulgarian swimmer
- Ventsislav Bengyuzov (Bulgarian: Венцислав Бенгюзов; born 22 January 1991), Bulgarian footballer
- Ventsislav Bonev (Bulgarian: Венцислав Бонев; born 8 May 1980), Bulgarian footballer who plays as a defender
- Ventsislav Dimitrov (Bulgarian: Венцислав Димитров; born 27 March 1988), Bulgarian footballer
- Ventsislav Hristov (Bulgarian: Венцислав Христов; born 9 November 1988), Bulgarian footballer
- Ventsislav Ivanov (footballer, born 1982) (Bulgarian: Венцислав Иванов; born 20 May 1982), Bulgarian footballer
- Ventsislav Ivanov (footballer, born 1995) (Bulgarian: Венцислав Иванов; born 7 September 1995), Bulgarian footballer
- Ventsislav Kerchev (Bulgarian: Венцислав Керчев; born 2 June 1997), Bulgarian footballer
- Ventsislav Lakov (Bulgarian: Венцислав Асенов Лаков; 1962–2025), Bulgarian politician and journalist
- Ventsislav Marinov (born 21 February 1983), Bulgarian footballer who plays as a defender
- Ventsislav Radev (Bulgarian: Венцислав Радев; born 9 January 1961), Bulgarian hurdler
- Ventsislav Varbanov (Bulgarian: Венцислав Василев Върбанов) (born 16 April 1962), Bulgarian politician
- Ventsislav Vasilev (Bulgarian: Венцислав Василев; born 8 July 1988), Bulgarian footballer who plays as a defender
- Ventsislav Velinov (Bulgarian: Венцислав Велинов) (born 2 January 1981), Bulgarian footballer who plays as a goalkeeper
- Ventsislav Yankov (Bulgarian: Венцислав Янков) (1926–2022), Bulgarian pianist and pedagogue
- Ventsislav Zhelev (Bulgarian: Венцислав Желев) (born 28 February 1980), Bulgarian footballer

== See also ==
- Višeslav
- Boleslaw (given name)
