= Venckus =

- Lithuanian surname
- m.: Venckus
- f.: (unmarried): Venckutė
- f.: (married): Venckuvienė, Venckienė
- Related names: Venskus

Venckus is a Lithuanian surname, a shortened Lithuanian translation of the Polish name, Wenceslaus. Germanized form: Wenckus.

Notable people with the surname include:

- Antanas Venckus (born 1955, Lithuanian actor
- Neringa Venckienė (born 1971), former Lithuanian judge and politician, M.P.
- Vanda Venckutė (1928–2010), Lithuanian actress
