= Czech military ranks =

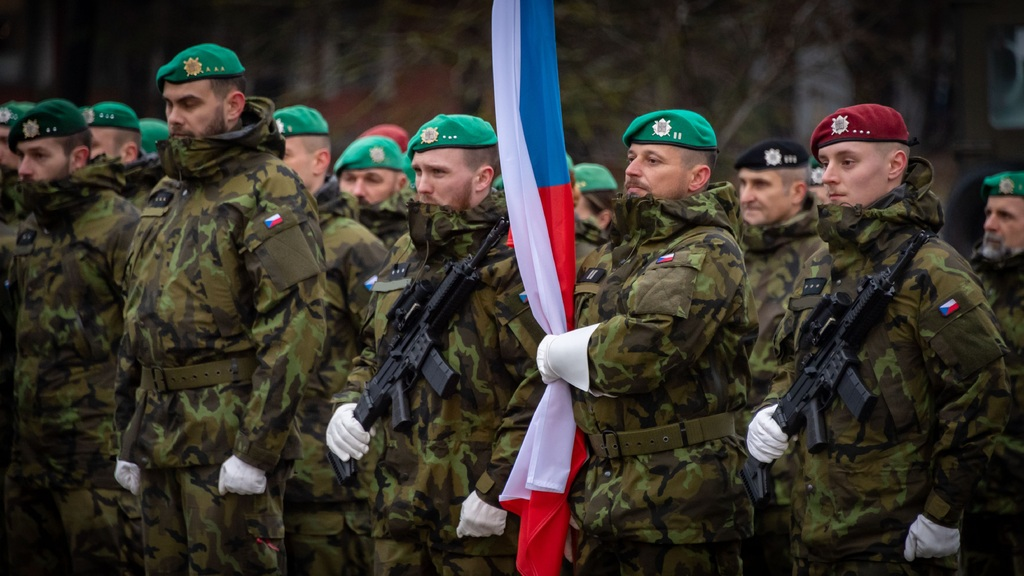
Czech armed forces' engineers deployed in Latvia displaying their rank insignia on the battle dress uniform (beret and chest).

The Czech military ranks are the military insignia used by the Army of the Czech Republic. The ranks are common for all its forces (Ground, Air, Special, Cyber and Information, Territorial). They are displayed on the beret or a service hat, as well as on the chest of the battledress. On the display uniform, the rank insignia is worn on epaulettes and a head cover, and differs slightly in the Air Force, where it is displayed against a dark blue fabric (such as is the colour of the Air Forces' uniform), instead of the khaki fabric, common for the rest of the forces. For all the forces, the ranks also have the same name.

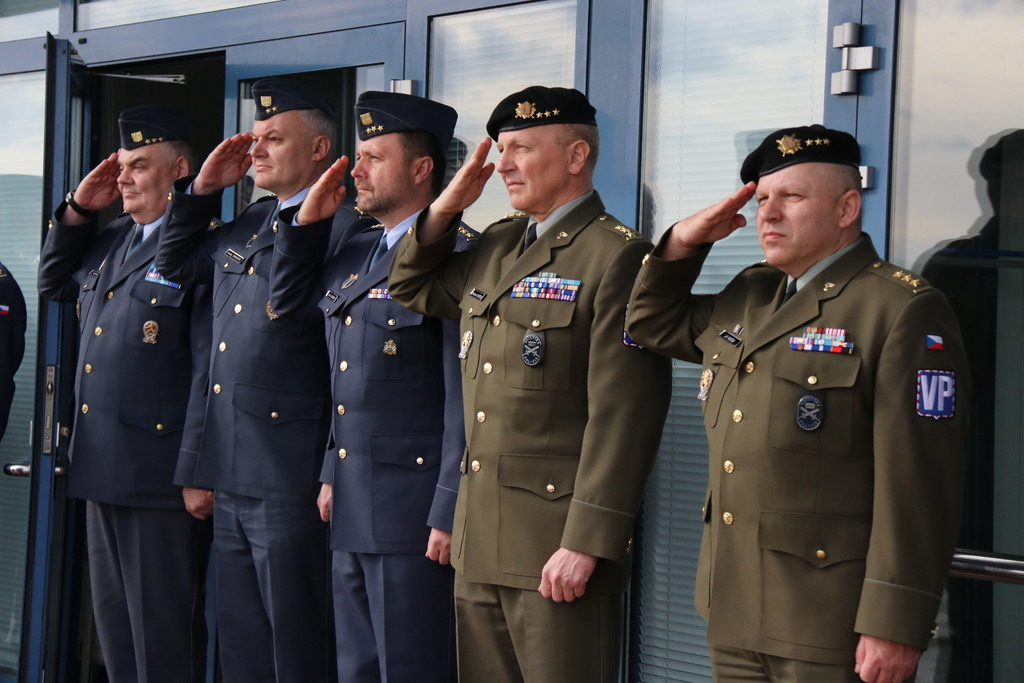
Czech Air Force and Military police officers wearing variants of display uniforms

The insignia differs in form for each rank group: The enlisted soldiers up to OR-4 wear so-called silver "pips", NCOs from OR-5 to OR-8 wear silver "rails", Sergeant Majors (OR-9) wear a single silver star with silver bordering. The junior officers wear three-pointed golden stars, colloquially called "Mercedeses", senior officers wear five-pointed golden stars with a single golden bar, generals wear five-pointed stars with golden bordering. There are no variants distinguishing the type of Corps, Commanding officers, etc. on the battledress. The type of Corps is being distinguished by lapel badges on display uniforms, and also, to a degree, by the colour of the military beret.

The current appearance of the rank insignia of the Czech Armed Forces has its origins in the Czechoslovak Military of the First Czechoslovak Republic, where that form has been introduced during the 1930s. During the post-war communist era, the Czechoslovak People's Army discontinued that model of insignia in 1950s in favour of the insignia adopted from the Soviet army, but the original ranks' model was again re-established in the 1960s, with several modifications. After a few reforms, the current form has been adopted in 2011 to put the system of ranks in accordance with the NATO countries' rank structure.

== Commissioned officer ranks ==
The rank insignia of commissioned officers.

NATO code	OF-10	OF-9	OF-8	OF-7	OF-6	OF-5	OF-4	OF-3	OF-2	OF-1
Czech Land Forces
Czech Land Forces		Armádní generál	Generálporučík	Generálmajor	Brigádní generál	Plukovník	Podplukovník	Major	Kapitán	Nadporučík	Poručík
Czech Air Force
Czech Air Force		Armádní generál	Generálporučík	Generálmajor	Brigádní generál	Plukovník	Podplukovník	Major	Kapitán	Nadporučík	Poručík
NATO code	OF-10	OF-9	OF-8	OF-7	OF-6	OF-5	OF-4	OF-3	OF-2	OF-1

== Other ranks ==
The rank insignia of non-commissioned officers and enlisted personnel.

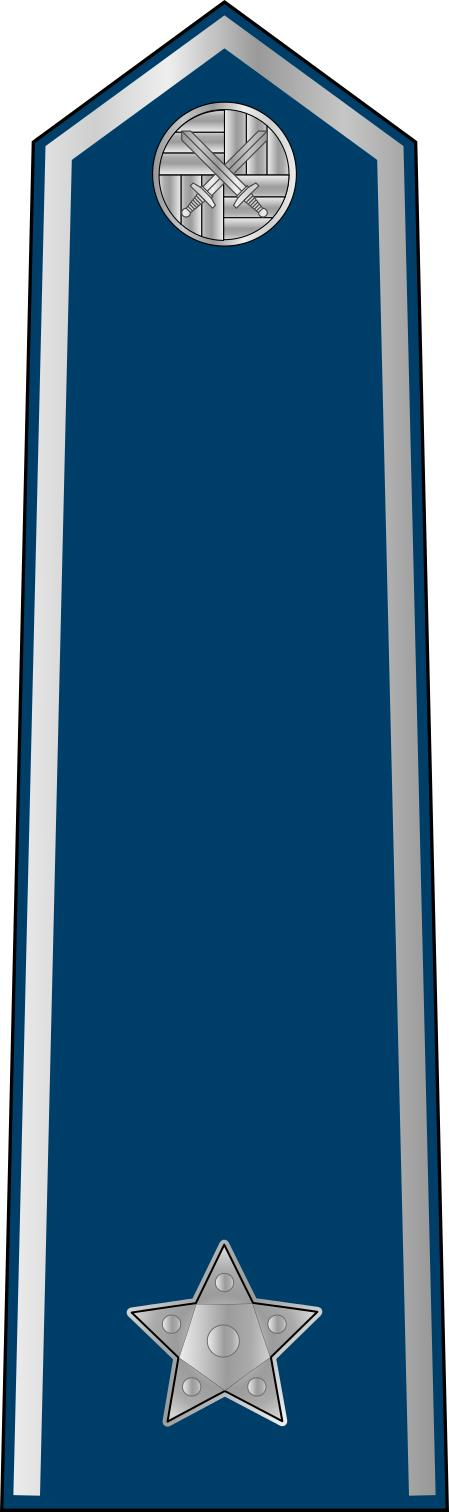
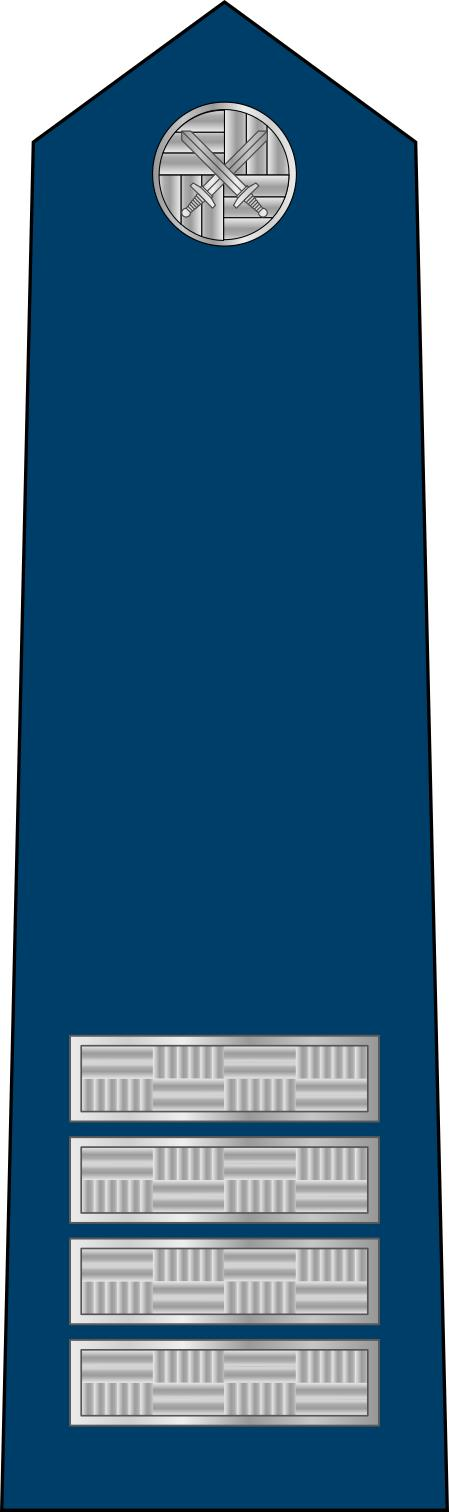
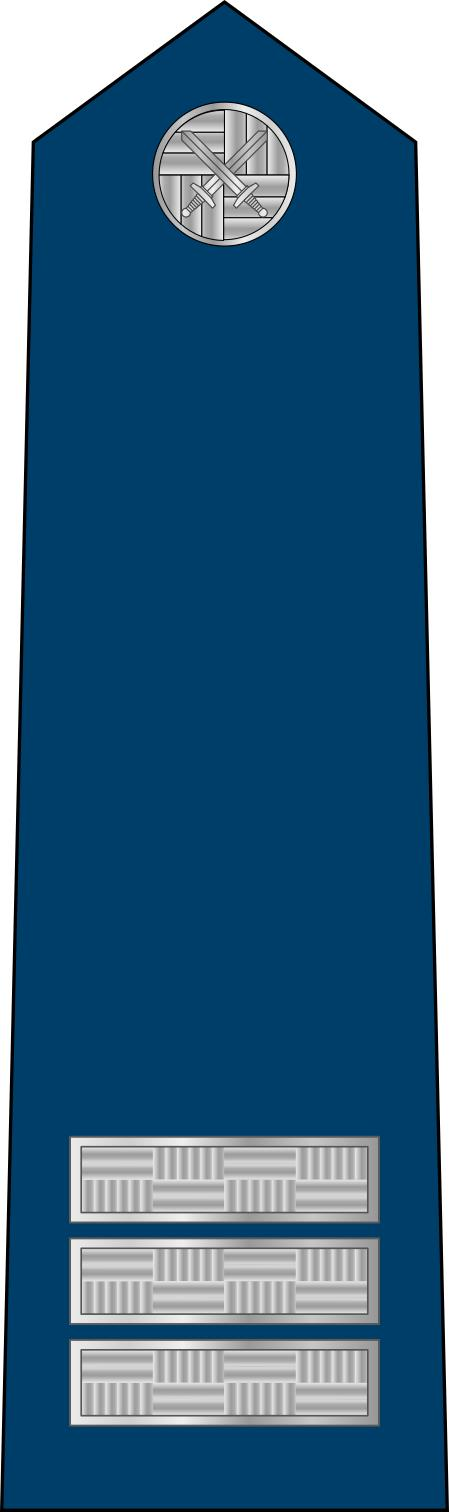
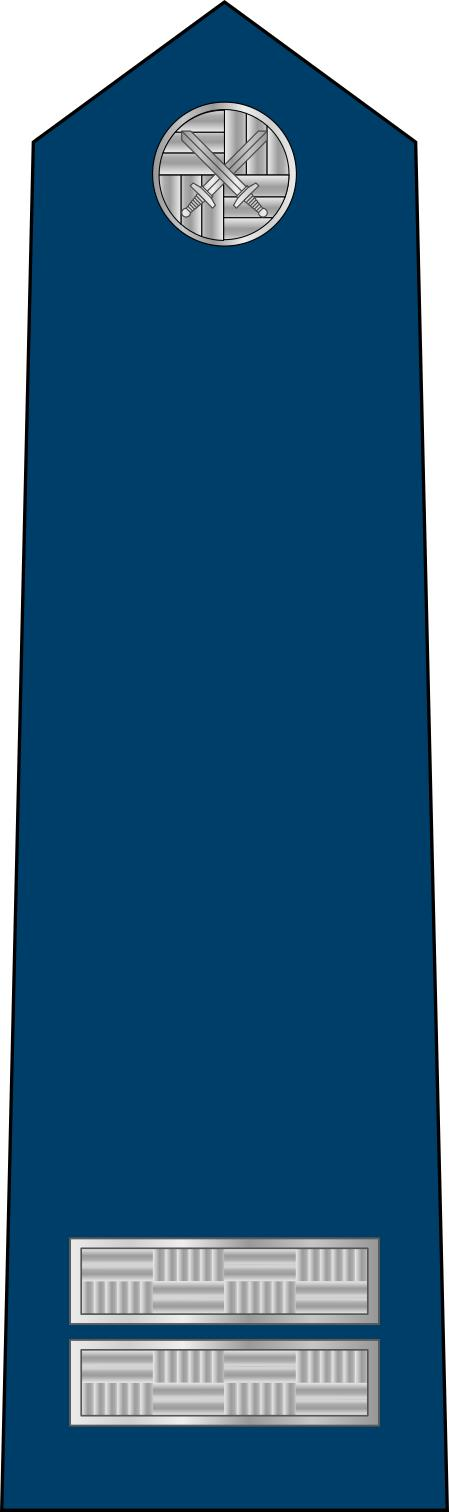
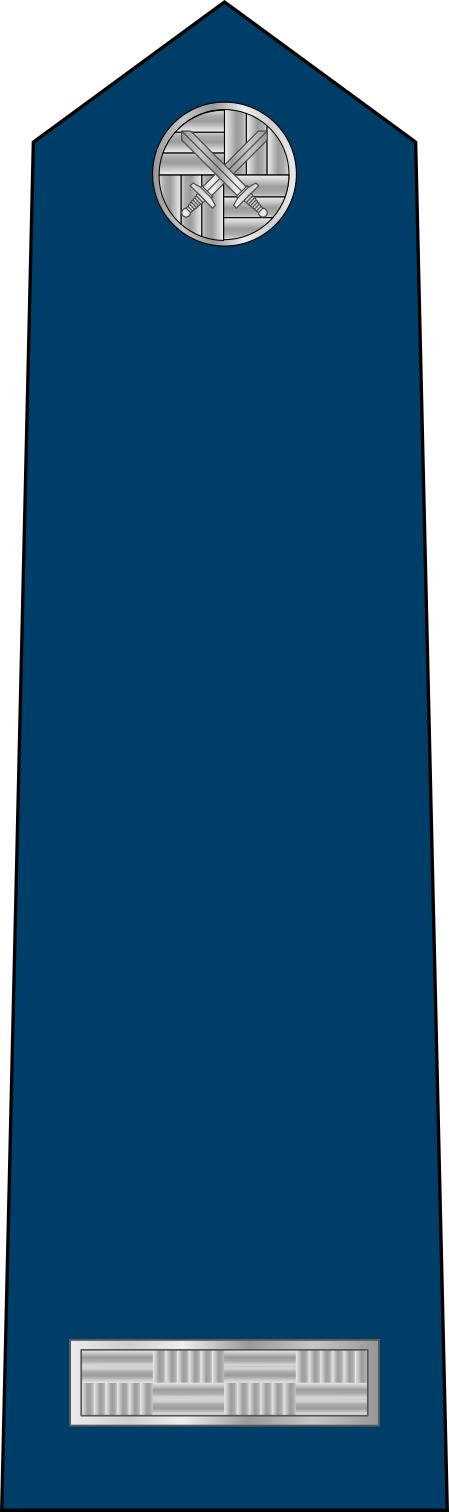
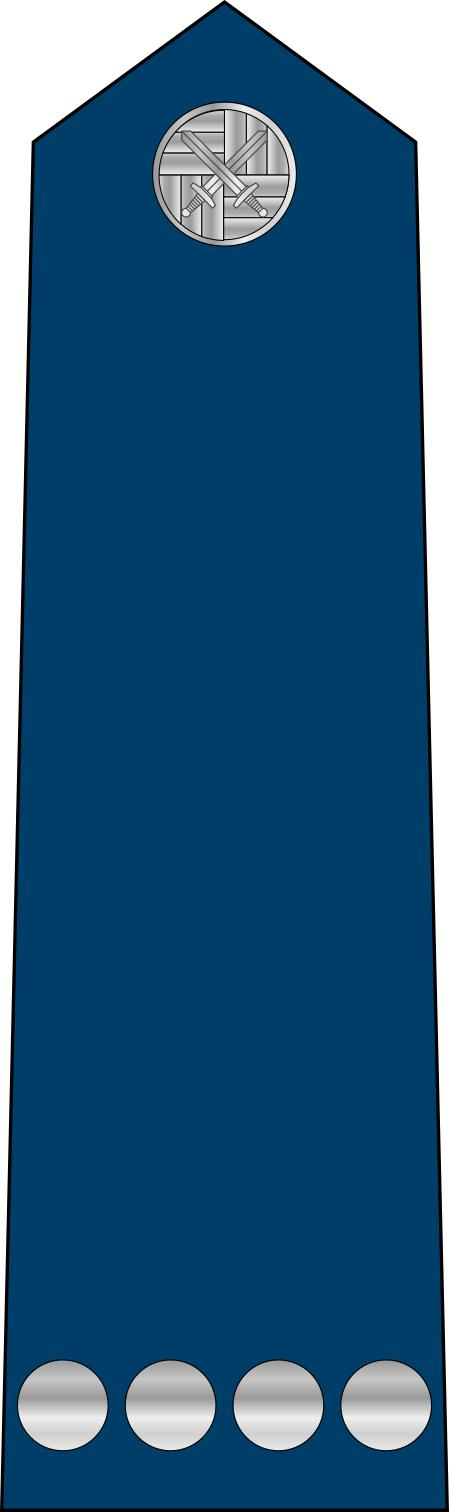
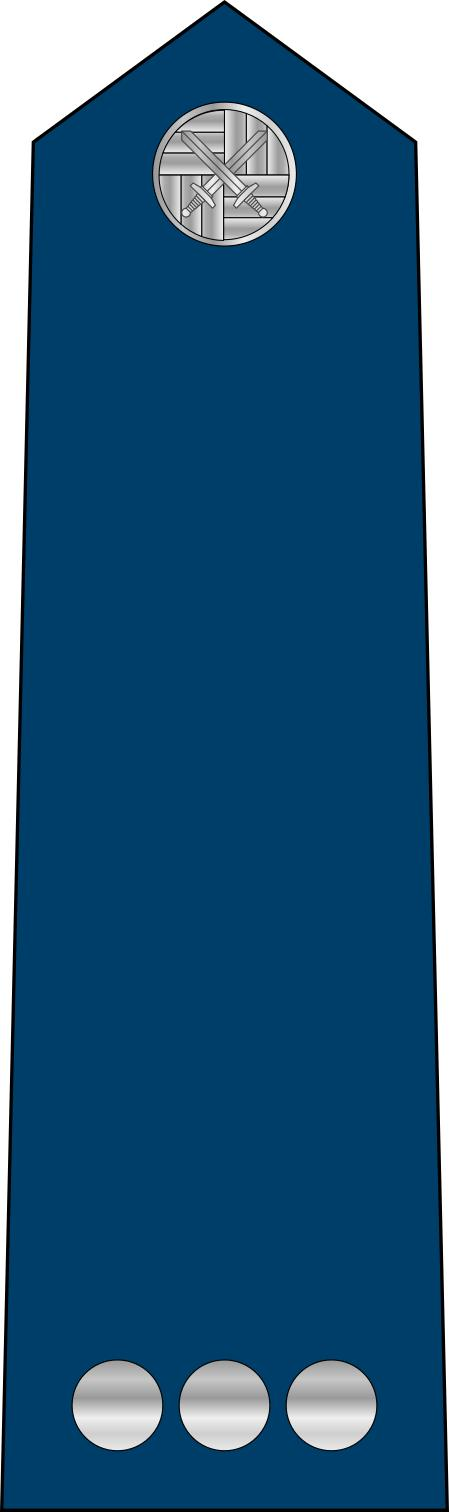
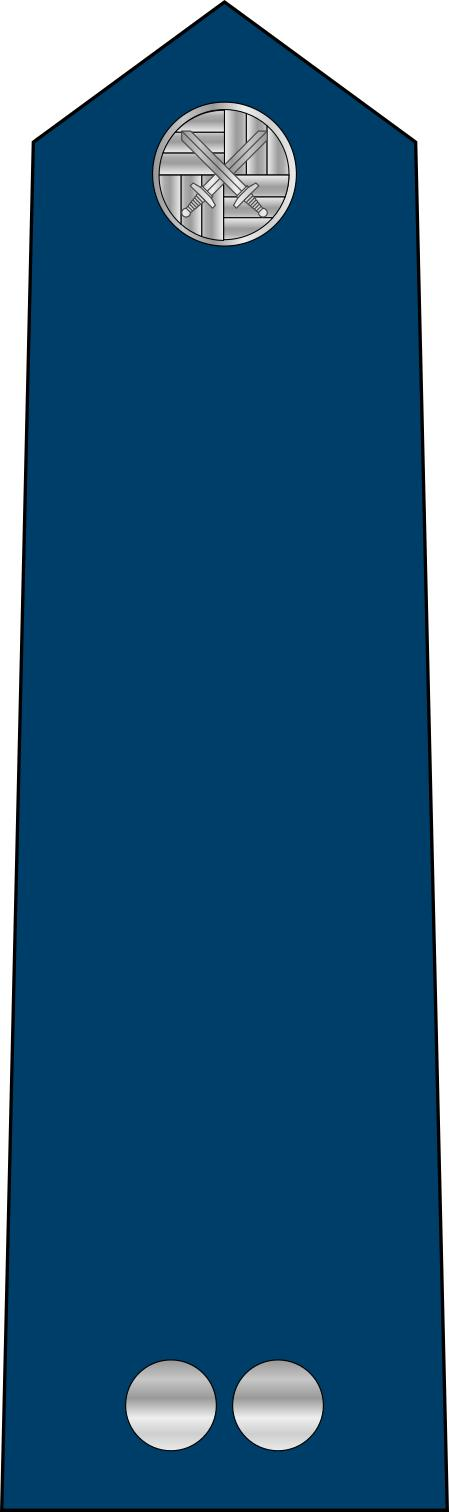
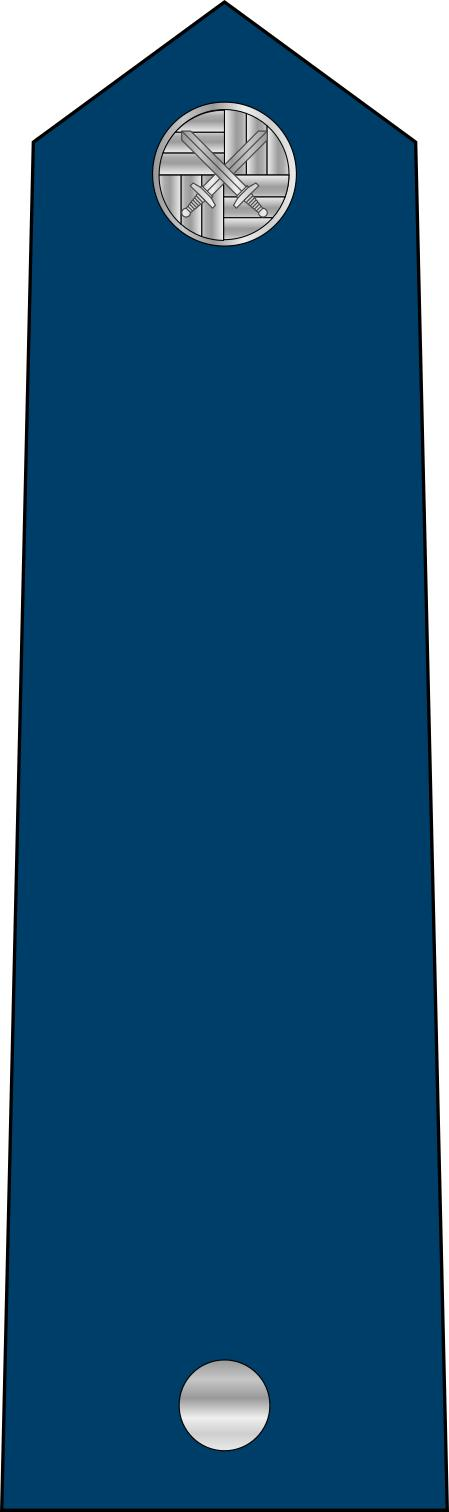
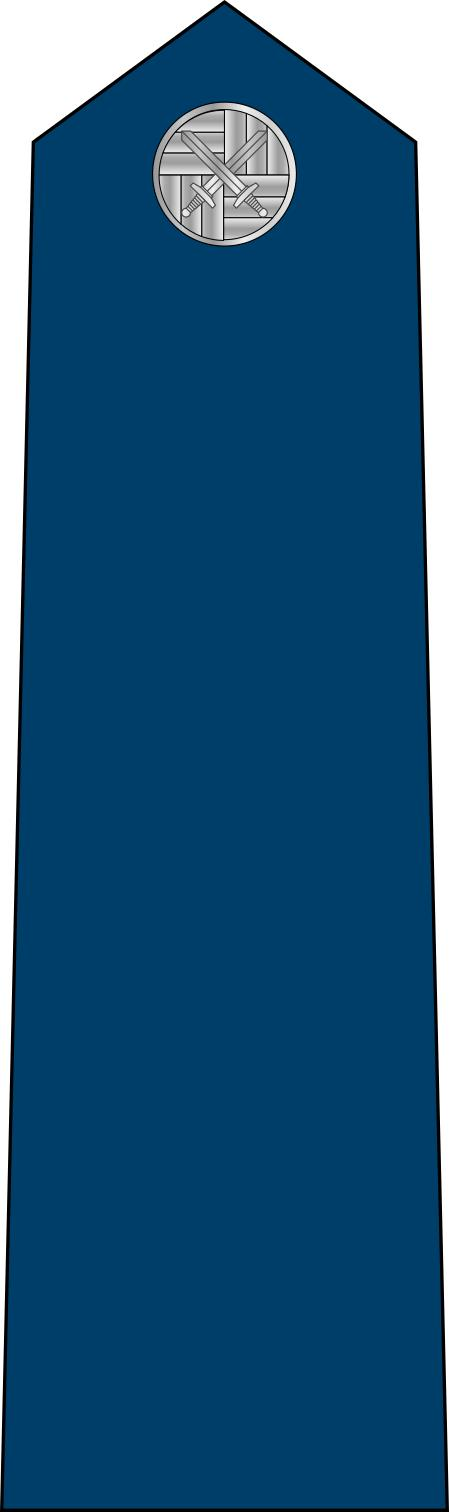
NATO code	OR-9	OR-8	OR-7	OR-6	OR-5	OR-4	OR-3	OR-2	OR-1
Czech Land Forces
Czech Land Forces	Štábní praporčík	Nadpraporčík	Praporčík	Nadrotmistr	Rotmistr	Rotný	Četař	Desátník	Svobodník	Vojín
Czech Air Force
Czech Air Force	Štábní praporčík	Nadpraporčík	Praporčík	Nadrotmistr	Rotmistr	Rotný	Četař	Desátník	Svobodník	Vojín
NATO code	OR-9	OR-8	OR-7	OR-6	OR-5	OR-4	OR-3	OR-2	OR-1

== See also ==
- Ranks of the Czechoslovak Armed Forces
