= Dnešice =

- Municipality
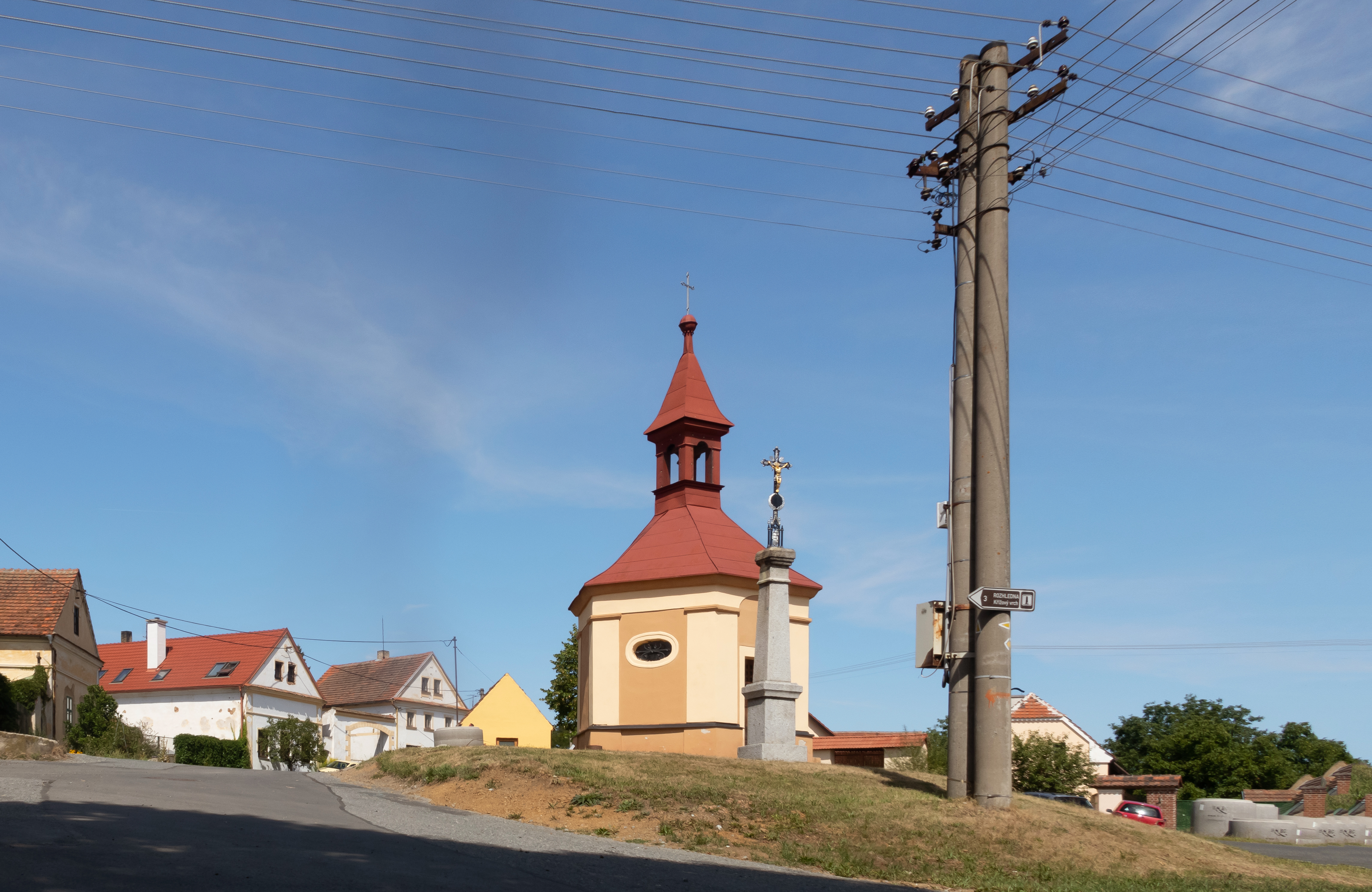
- Černotín, a part of Dnešice

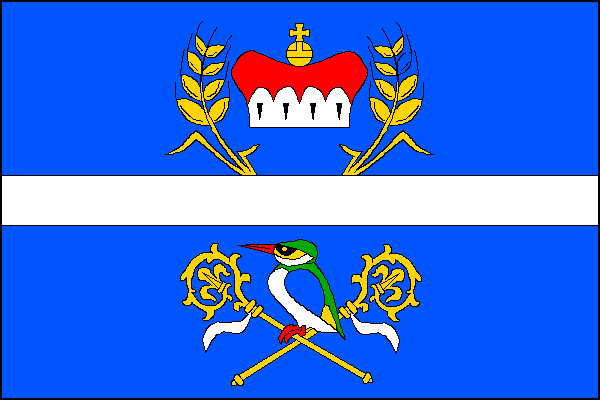
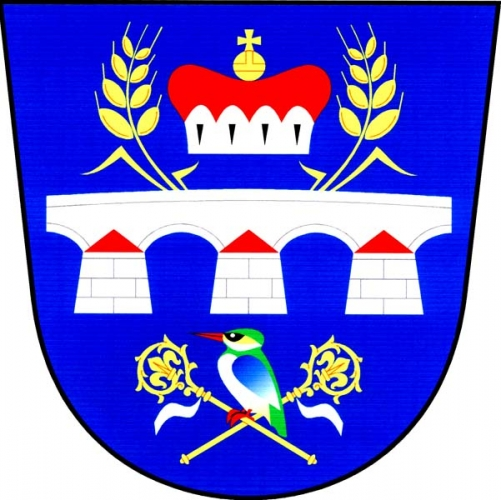
- Flag Coat of arms

- Location in the Czech Republic
- Coordinates: 49°36′18″N 13°15′53″E
- Country: Czech Republic
- Region: Plzeň
- District: Plzeň-South
- First mentioned: 1115

Area
  - Total: 14.27 km^{2} (5.51 sq mi)
- Elevation: 372 m (1,220 ft)

Population (2026-01-01)
  - Total: 890
  - Density: 62/km^{2} (160/sq mi)
- Time zone: UTC+1 (CET)
  - Summer (DST): UTC+2 (CEST)
- Postal codes: 334 01, 334 43
- Website: www.dnesice.cz

Dnešice is a municipality and village in Plzeň-South District in the Plzeň Region of the Czech Republic. It has about 900 inhabitants.

Dnešice lies approximately 18 kilometres (11 mi) south-west of Plzeň and 99 km (62 mi) south-west of Prague.

== Administrative division ==
Dnešice consists of two municipal parts (in brackets population according to the 2021 census):

- Dnešice (676)
- Černotín (115)

== Demographics ==
Historical population
Year	Pop.	±%
1869	680	—
1880	826	+21.5%
1890	817	−1.1%
1900	966	+18.2%
1910	1,056	+9.3%
1921	1,168	+10.6%
1930	1,160	−0.7%
1950	986	−15.0%
1961	961	−2.5%
1970	866	−9.9%
1980	773	−10.7%
1991	741	−4.1%
2001	761	+2.7%
2011	812	+6.7%
2021	791	−2.6%
Source: Censuses

== Notable people ==
- Václav Jícha (1914–1945), flying ace
