= Wenceslao =

Wenceslao is a Spanish masculine given name, derived from Wenceslaus, itself a Latinized version of the Czech name Václav. It may refer to:

- Wenceslao Afugu (born 1992), Equitorial Guinean footballer
- Wenceslao Alpuche (1804–1841), Mexican politician
- Wenceslao Ayguals de Izco (1801–1873), Spanish writer
- Wenceslao Borroto (born 1958), Cuban rower
- Wenceslao Bruciaga (born 1977), Mexican journalist
- Wences Casares (born 1974), Argentine entrepreneur
- Wenceslao Carrillo, Spanish Socialist leader, father of Santiago Carrillo
- Wenceslao Díaz (born 1987), Mexican retired footballer
- Wenceslao Díaz Gallegos (1834–1895), Chilean scientist and surgeon
- Wenceslao Fernández (born 1979), Mexican retired footballer
- Wenceslao Fernández Flórez ((1885–1964), Spanish journalist and novelist
- Wenceslao Ferrín (born 1969), Colombian retired sprinter
- Wenceslao Figuereo (1834–1910), Dominican politician
- Wenceslao Herrera Coyac (born 1948), Mexican politician
- Wenceslao Lagumbay (1913–1995), Filipino politician
- Wenceslao Lara Orellana (born 1962), Honduran politician
- Wenceslao Moguel (c. 1890–1976), Mexican soldier in the Mexican Revolution who survived execution by firing squad
- Wenceslao Moreno (1896–1999), Spanish ventriloquist known as "Señor Wences"
- Wenceslao Padilla (1949–2018), Filipino priest
- Wenceslao Paunero (disambiguation)
- Wenceslao Ramírez de Villa-Urrutia (1850–1933), Spanish nobleman
- Wenceslao Retana (1862–1924), Spanish polymath
- Wenceslao Robles (1820–1866), Paraguayan general
- Wenceslao Roces (1897–1992), Spanish professor
- Wenceslao Salgado (1900–1980), Peruvian sports shooter
- Wenceslao Sarmiento (1922–2013), Peruvian modernist architect
- Wenceslao Sierra (1864–?), Chilean politician
- Wenceslao Trinidad (1933–2016), Filipino politician
- Wenceslao Vinzons (1910–1942), Filipino politician and guerilla leader against the Japanese occupation

== See also ==
- Noelle Wenceslao (born 1979), Filipina mountaineer
- SS San Wenceslao, British merchanting ship
