= Wenskus =

Wenskus is a form of the Lithuanian surname Venskus, Germanized in Lithuania Minor/East Prussia. Notable people with the surname include:

- Claus Wenskus (1891–1966), German painter
- Otta Wenskus (born 1955), German classical philologist
- Reinhard Wenskus (1916-2002), German historian
