= Václav Jícha =

Czech flying ace

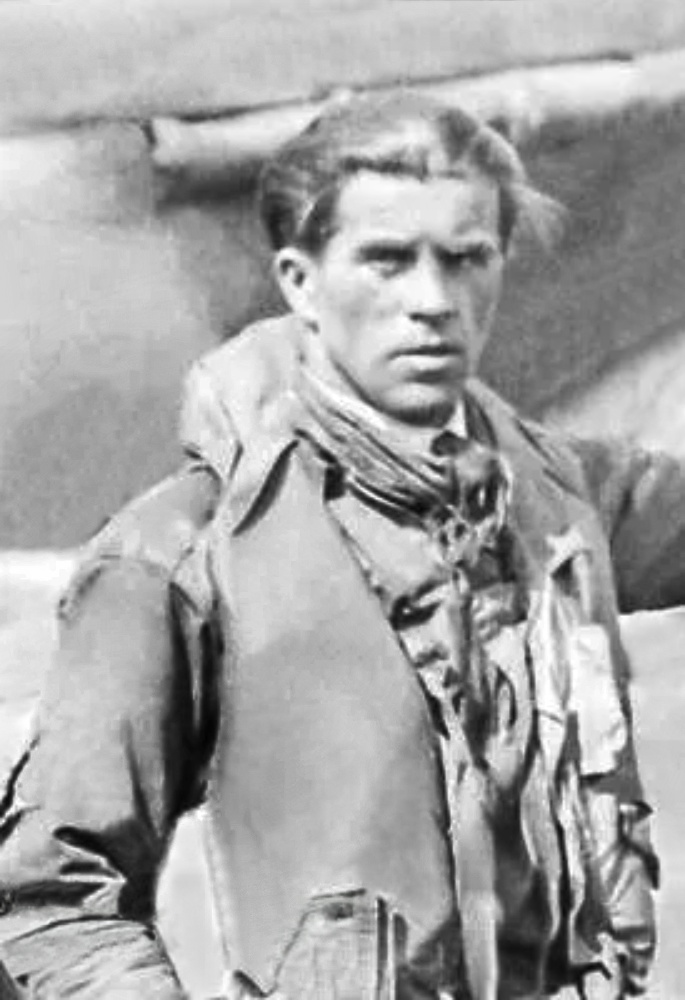
Václav Jícha

Václav Jícha, DFC (10 February 1914 – 1 February 1945) was a Czech flying ace, flying with the Czechoslovak Air Force, French Air Force and Royal Air Force during the Second World War, credited with seven victories.

== Early life ==
Jícha was born in Dnešice, Bohemia, Austria-Hungary (now in the Czech Republic) on 10 February 1914, the first of two children of Václav and Kateřina (née Smolová) Jícha. His father was a porter at a psychiatric hospital in Dobřany.

He graduated from a technical college, specialising in electromechanics, on 30 April 1929. He worked at a flying club at Letňany and obtained his pilot's licence in 1933.

== Military career ==
On 1 October 1935, Jícha began his two-year mandatory military service and was assigned to the 64th Squadron, 3rd Air Regiment, based in Piešťany. He graduated from a flight mechanics school in Nitra 9th out of 65. On 1 July 1936, he enrolled in the Military Aviation Academy in Prostějov for pilot training, which he completed on 31 March 1937. He was posted to the 43rd Squadron, 1st Fighter Regiment, Czechoslovak Air Force, based at Prague–Kbely Airport. On 30 September 1937, his compulsory service ended, but he elected to remain in the military. After completing training on 1 October, Jícha was assigned to the 34th Squadron, 1st Fighter Regiment, flying the Avia B-534 biplane fighter out of Prague–Kbely Airport. On 1 December, he was promoted to desátník (lowest non-commissioned officer rank). In January 1938, he was transferred to the 4th Squadron, 1st Fighter Regiment, based in Hradec Králové. On 15 February, he was reassigned to the 43rd Squadron at Prague–Kbely. He was promoted to četař (sergeant) on 1 May. A talented aviator, he was selected for the nine-member Air Force aerobatic team, flying the Avia B.122 biplane, and was also part of a three-man demonstration team.

Responding to Nazi Germany's threats regarding Czechoslovakia's Sudetenland region, the government mobilised on 23 September 1938, and Jícha's squadron was deployed to Cvrčovice. However, the Czechoslovaks were forced to cede the region by the Munich Agreement, the military demobilised, and the squadron returned to Prague–Kbely. Germany then seized the rest of his country on 15 March 1939 and disbanded the Czechoslovak military.

Jícha fled, first to Poland, arriving on 13 May, then to France to join the French Air Force, sailing from Gdynia aboard the ocean liner MS Batory on 22 May 1939 and docking at Cherbourg on 26 May. He enlisted in the French Foreign Legion as a private for a term of five years on 14 June, and departed Marseille for the Legion's training camp in Sidi Bel Abbès, Algeria, joining the Foreign Legion's 1st Regiment.

After the German invasion of Poland, France declared war on Germany on 3 September 1939. Jícha was trained to use French equipment in Oran and was promoted to sergeant on 2 October. After completing training on 13 December, he was assigned to Groupe de Chasse I/6, based in Oran and equipped with Morane-Saulnier M.S.406 fighters. Two days later, I/6 was redeployed to France, first at Marseille-Marignane airbase, then at a couple of other locations, before returning to Marseille-Marignane on 2 May 1940. He flew during the German invasion of France, which began on 10 May 1940, shooting down a Messerschmitt Me 109 fighter on 20 May, a Dornier Do 17 light bomber on 21 May, a shared Do 17 on 24 May, and a Henschel Hs 123 biplane dive bomber/close support aircraft on 5 June. Defeated, France was forced to sign an armistice which went into effect on 25 June.

Jícha traveled to England by a circuitous route, from Port-Vendres near the Spanish border to Oran, Casablanca and Gibraltar, reaching Liverpool on 12 July. He enlisted in the Royal Air Force as a sergeant and was assigned as a reserve pilot to No. 310 (Czechoslovak) Squadron RAF on 6 August. On 17 August, he was transferred to No. 6 Operational Training Unit to learn to fly the Hawker Hurricane. After completing his retraining, he was assigned to first No. 238 Squadron RAF, then to No. 1 Squadron RAF at RAF Wittering in late September. There, he was credited with either a shared Do 17 on 29 October and a Junkers Ju 88 on 30 October or a shared Ju 88 on 30 October. On 17 November, he was transferred to No. 17 Squadron RAF at RAF Martlesham Heath. Jícha was promoted to flight sergeant on 1 March 1941 and to pilot officer on 29 April. On 27 May, he joined the recently formed No. 313 (Czechoslovak) Squadron RAF at RAF Catterick. He shot down a Focke-Wulf Fw 190 on 28 March 1942. Returning from escorting a bombing raid on 24 April, Jícha twice went to the aid of squadron mate Flight Sergeant Prokop Brázda, whose Supermarine Spitfire had been damaged, against multiple Fw 190s, claiming one damaged or 'probable' victory; Brázda died while attempting to land.

On 17 August 1942, Jícha became a test pilot with No. 45 Maintenance Unit RAF at Castle Bromwich. By May 1944, he had amassed 822 hours in the air, surviving 15 forced landings. On 17 May, a new regulation banning foreign pilots from working on secret projects led to his reassignment to the Czechoslovak Depot at RAF Cosford for five days, before being transferred to No. 9 Maintenance Unit RAF at RAF Kinloss in Scotland.

== Death ==
On 1 February 1945, Jícha was either a passenger on or the co-pilot of an Avro Anson. The pilot failed to check the weather report and flew into a snowstorm, crashing into Turf Law, Scotland and killing all three men aboard. Jícha was interred in Haddington Roman Catholic Graveyard, East Lothian, Scotland.

== Awards and honours ==
He was awarded the following medals:

- (France) Croix de Guerre with palm
- (Czechoslovakia) Czechoslovak War Cross (Československý válečný kříž)
- (United Kingdom) Distinguished Flying Cross on 28 September 1942
- (United Kingdom) Air Force Cross posthumously on 28 November 1945, the latter for his test pilot accomplishments.

In 2007, a memorial plaque was installed on Jícha's birthplace in Dnešice. There is also a memorial plaque at the primary school he attended. A street in Prague is named in his honour.

== Personal life ==
When he was 24, he met 18-year-old Juliette Liska, who was a female pilot, a rarity at the time. They became engaged, but never married because of the war. Liska became a member of the Belgian Resistance's Comet Line. She was betrayed and sent to a concentration camp, before being reassigned to a mobile labour group repairing railroad lines. Surviving the war, she visited Jícha's grave several times.
