= Wacław Leszczyński =

Wacław Leszczyński may refer to:

- Wacław Leszczyński (1576–1628), voivode of Kalisz, chancellor
- Wacław Leszczyński (1605–1666), Prince-Bishop of Warmia, primate of Poland, see List of bishops of Warmia

== See also ==
- Wacław
