= Vysheslav (disambiguation) =

Vysheslav was a knyaz of Novgorod.

Vysheslav may also refer to:

- Russian ship Vysheslav, Russian Imperial Navy ship-of-the-line
- Vysheslav (play), a 11768 play by Alexander Sumarokov

== See also ==
- Višeslav
- Vyacheslav
