= Vjenceslav =

Vjenceslav is a masculine given name found in Croatia. It is cognate to the Latin name Wenceslaus.

Notable people with the name include:

- Vjenceslav Novak (1859–1905), Croatian writer
- Vjenceslav Richter (1917–2002), Croatian architect
- Vjenceslav Turković (1826–1902), Croatian businessman and politician
