= Višeslav =

- Gender: masculine
- Language: Serbo-Croatian

Origin
- Origin: više ("higher") + slava ("glory, fame")
- Meaning: "higher glory"
- Region of origin: Balkans

Other names
- Variant form: Višeslava (f.)

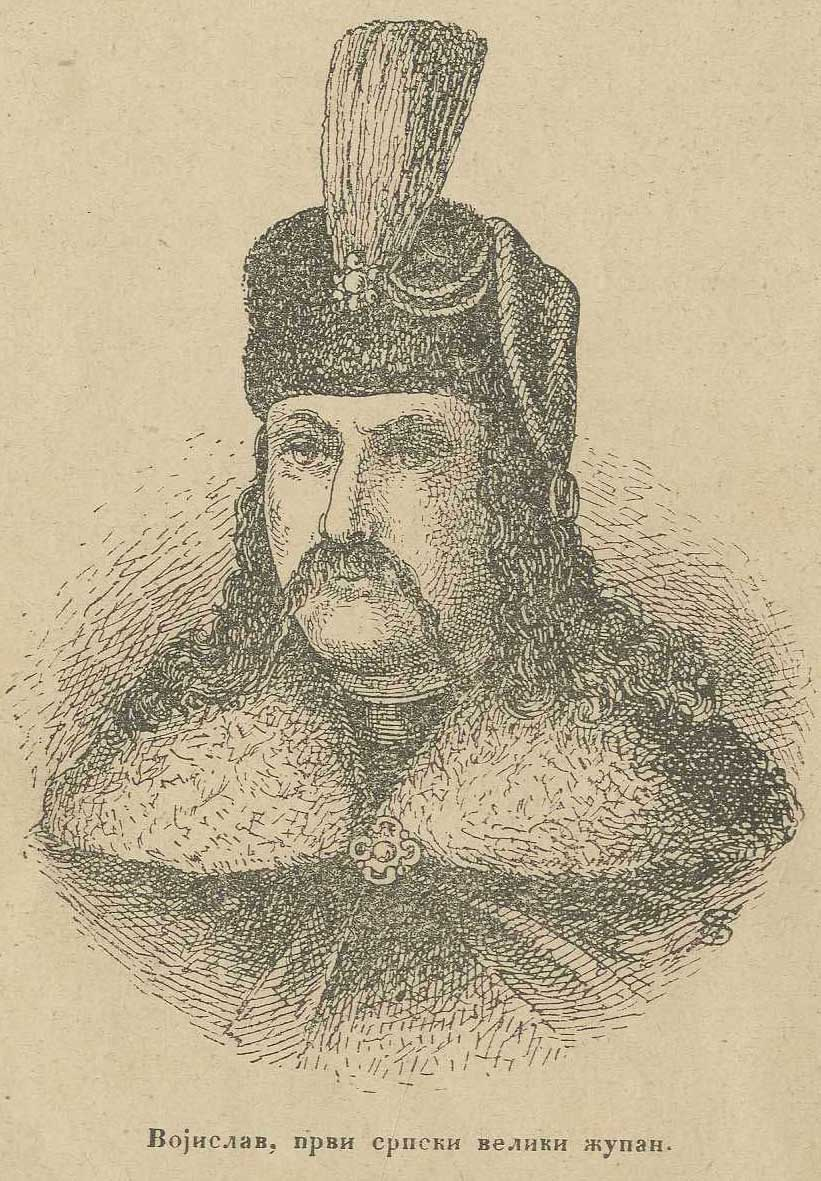
Višeslav, Prince of Serbia

Višeslav (Serbian Cyrillic: Вишеслав) is a Serbo-Croatian masculine given name, a Slavic dithematic name (of two lexemes), derived from the Slavic words više ("higher") and -slav ("glory, fame"), roughly meaning "higher glory". It may refer to:

- Višeslav of Serbia, Prince of Serbia (c. 780)
- Višeslav of Croatia, Prince of Dalmatian Croatia (c. 800–10)
- Višeslav Sarić, Croatian water polo player (born 1977)

== See also ==
- Vojislav
- Vysheslav (disambiguation)
- Vjenceslav
