= Vince (disambiguation) =

Vince is a given name and a surname. It may also refer to:

- Vince Bayou, a river in Texas
- Vince Camuto, a footwear designer and fashion brand
- Vince, Kumanovo, a village in Kumanovo Municipality, Republic of Macedonia
- Hurricane Vince, a 2005 Atlantic Ocean hurricane
- Vince (company), a contemporary clothing brand
- Vince Lombardi Trophy, awarded to the winning team of the Super Bowl
