= Sally Wenzel =

American pulmonologist

- Born: Inverness, Florida, US
- Spouse: Dana Morganroth

Academic background
- Education: BS, 1978, MD, 1981, University of Florida

Academic work
- Institutions: University of Pittsburgh School of Medicine; University of Colorado Health Sciences Center

Sally Ellen Wenzel–Morganroth is an American pulmonologist. She is a professor and Rachel Carson Chair of Environmental Health at the University of Pittsburgh Graduate School of Public Health. Wenzel was formally the co-director of the Harry and Jeanette Weinberg Clinical Research Unit at National Jewish Medical and Research Center.

In 2012, Wenzel and Samuel Yousem were the first to identify asthmatic granulomatosis.

== Early life and education ==
Wenzel was born to father Fred Wenzel in Inverness, Florida and attended Citrus High School. In her senior year, she won the National Merit scholarship, Florida Regents Merit Certificate, Reader's Digest Award, and the Bausch & Lomb Science Award. She was also the recipient of Citrus High School's Outstanding Student Award after recording a perfect score in the college placement tests. Upon graduating high school, Wenzel attended the University of Florida for her undergraduate and medical degrees and completed her residency in internal medicine at Wake Forest University.

== Career ==
Upon completing her fellowship, Wenzel accepted a position at the University of Colorado Health Sciences Center and with the American Thoracic Society (ATS). As a result of her academic research, she was elected a Fellow of the American College of Chest Physicians and American Academy of Asthma, Allergy and Immunology. In 2010, her research project "Asthma Phenotypes: A Prelude to Mechanistic Insights on Disease Pathogenesis" earned her the ATS Recognition Award for Scientific Accomplishments.

Wenzel eventually left the University of Colorado to accept a professorship position at the University of Pittsburgh School of Medicine. While there, Wenzel and Samuel Yousem were the first to identify asthmatic granulomatosis which is a subset of severe asthma "with small-airway changes consistent with asthma but also with interstitial nonnecrotizing granulomas." In 2016, she was the first woman honored with the Breathing for Life Award from the American Thoracic Society for her "advocacy for women in science and mentoring of young scientists." The following year, she was the recipient of the European Respiratory Society's Presidential Award which "recognizes outstanding contributions to the strengthening of respiratory medicine worldwide."

Wenzel continued her research into the possible pathway leading to asthma exacerbation, which accumulated in a 2017 study published in the journal Cell. Alongside Valerian Kagan and Hulya Bayir, Wenzel described, for the first time, a cell-death pathway that can destroy healthy cells, resulting in tissue and organ damage. They found that the protein PEBP1 "serves as the pathway warden in controlling whether a certain enzyme (15LO) ends up making a fat molecule or lipid (OOH-PEs) in such volumes that they signal the activation of the cell-death process." In 2018, Wenzel was appointed the Chair of Environmental and Occupational Health in the University of Pittsburgh Graduate School of Public Health. She was also the recipient of the Ladies Hospital Aid Society Trailblazer award for her "studies of severe asthma, and asthma phenotypes." While serving in the role as Chair of Environmental and Occupational Health, Wenzel became an investigator in the clinical trial for the new biologic drug dupilumab.

== Selected publications ==
- The pathobiology of asthma: implications for treatment
- Wenzel, Sally E.; Chipps, Bradley E.; Rasouliyan, Lawrence; Borish, Larry; Haselkorn, Tmirah; Lee, June H. (2007-12-01). "Risk Factors Associated With Persistent Airflow Limitation in Severe or Difficult-to-Treat Asthma: Insights From the TENOR Study". Chest. 132 (6): 1882–1889. doi:10.1378/chest.07-0713. ISSN 0012-3692. PMID 18079222.

== Personal life ==
Wenzel is married to Dana Morganroth, the founding director of the Pittsburgh Freethought Community.
