= Ranks of the Czechoslovak Armed Forces =

Ranks of the Czechoslovak Armed Forces shows the military ranks and rank insignia in use by the First, Second, Third, and Fourth Czechoslovak Republic.

== Overview ==
After the independence of Czechoslovakia, the new republic at first used the ranks of the Austro-Hungarian Army, but from 1920 a system was introduced that was basically similar to the one used by today's Army of the Czech Republic.

== Ranks (1918–1919) ==
=== Officers ===
Rank group	Generals			Field Officers			Company Officers			Officer Cadets
(Czechoslovakia) Czechoslovak Home Army
(Czechoslovakia) Czechoslovak Home Army	Polní zbrojmistr	Polní podmaršálek	Generálmajor	Plukovník	Podplukovník	Major	Setník	Nadporučík	Poručík	Praporčík	Kadet aspirant

=== Other ranks ===
Rank group	Senior NCO			Junior NCO		Enlisted
(Czechoslovakia) Czechoslovak Home Army
(Czechoslovakia) Czechoslovak Home Army	Důstojnický zástupce	Štábní šikovatel	Šikovatel	Četař	Desátník	Svobodník	Vojín

== Ranks (1919–1920) ==
=== Officers, officials and cadets ===
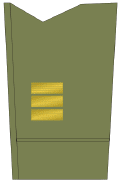
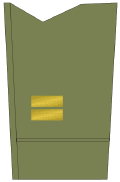
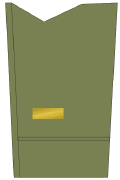
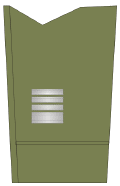
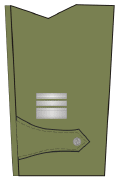
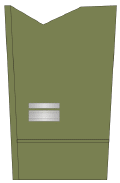
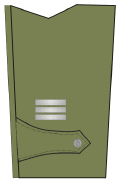
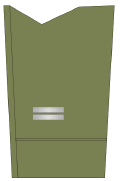
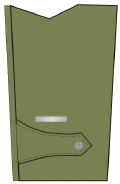
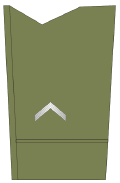
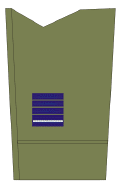
Rank group	Generals			Field Officers			Company Officers			Officials without rank class	Officer Cadets
(Czechoslovakia) Czechoslovak Army
(Czechoslovakia) Czechoslovak Army	Polní zbrojmistr	Polní podmaršálek	Generálmajor	Plukovník	Podplukovník	Major	Setník	Nadporučík	Poručík	Gážista	Praporčík

=== Other ranks ===
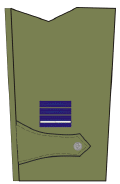
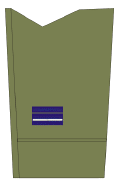
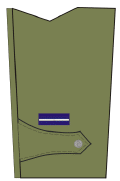
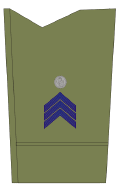
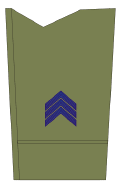
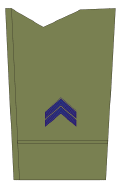
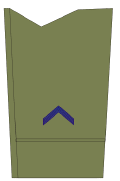
Rank group	Senior NCO			Junior NCO			Enlisted
(Czechoslovakia) Czechoslovak Army
(Czechoslovakia) Czechoslovak Army	Důstojnický zástupce	Štábní šikovatel	Šikovatel	Četař (Jednoročni dobrovolník)	Četař	Desátník	Svobodník	Vojín

== Ranks (1920–1929) ==
=== Officers ===
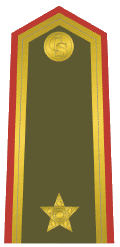
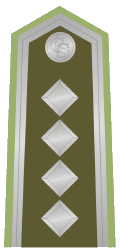
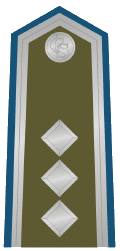
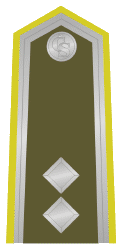
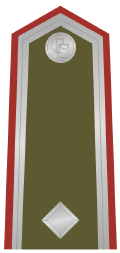
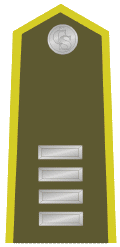
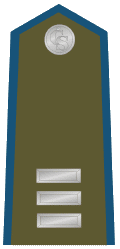
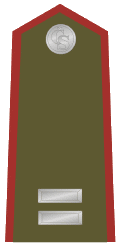
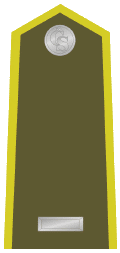
Rank group	Generals	Field Officers					Company Officers
Czechoslovak Army
Czechoslovak Army	Generál	Plukovník	Podplukovník	Major	Štábní kapitán	Kapitán	Nadporučík	Poručík	Podporučík

=== NCO and enlisted ===
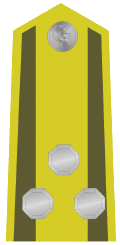
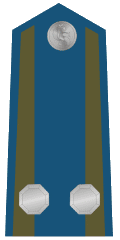
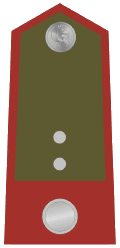
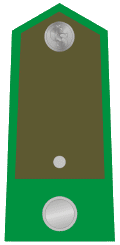
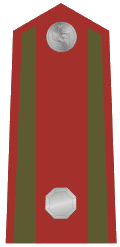
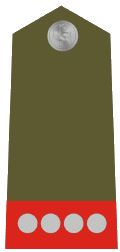
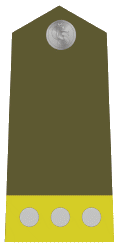
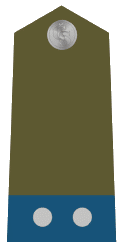
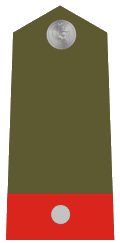
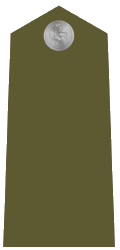
Rank group	Senior NCOs					Junior NCOs			Enlisted
Czechoslovak Army
Czechoslovak Army	Praporčík	Štábní rotmistr	Rotmistr with 12 years service	Rotmistr with 6 years service	Rotmistr	Rotný	Četař	Desátník	Svobodník	Vojín

Note: The different colours of the epaulettes distinguish different corps, for example maroon standing for infantry, red for artillery, green for sappers and engineers, yellow for cavalry, light blue for the air force, etc.

== Ranks (1930–1939) ==
=== Officers ===
Rank group	Generals			Field Officers				Company Officers
Czechoslovak Army
Czechoslovak Army	Armádní generál	Divisní generál	Brigádní generál	Plukovník	Podplukovník	Major	Štábní kapitán	Kapitán	Nadporučík	Poručík	Podporučík

=== NCOs and enlisted ===
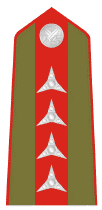
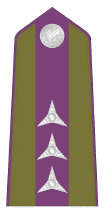
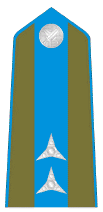
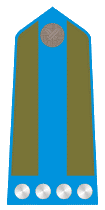
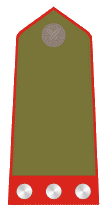
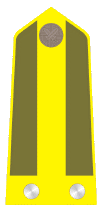
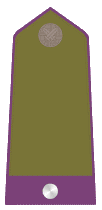
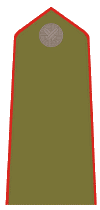
Rank group	Senior NCOs				Junior NCOs			Enlisted
Czechoslovak Army
Czechoslovak Army	Štábní praporčík	Praporčík	Štábní rotmistr	Rotmistr	Rotný	Četař	Desátník	Svobodník	Vojín

Note: The different colours of the epaulettes distinguish different corps, for example maroon standing for infantry, red for artillery, green for sappers and engineers, yellow for cavalry, light blue for the air force, etc.

== Ranks (1945–1950) ==
=== Officers ===
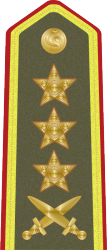
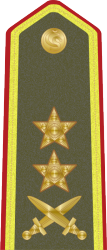
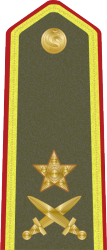
Rank group	Generals			Field Officers				Company Officers
Czechoslovak Army
Czechoslovak Army	Armádní generál	Divisní generál	Brigádní generál	Plukovník	Podplukovník	Major	Štábní kapitán	Kapitán	Nadporučík	Poručík	Podporučík

=== NCOs and enlisted ===
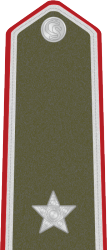
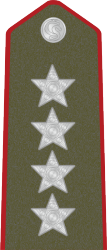
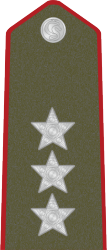
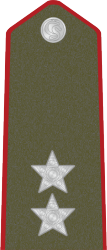
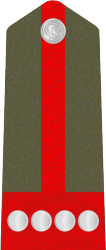
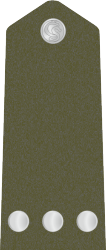
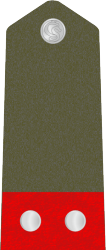
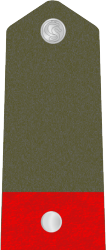
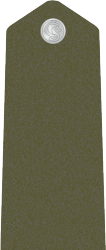
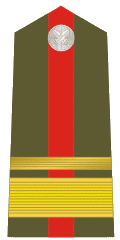
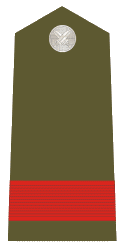
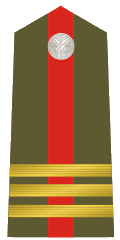
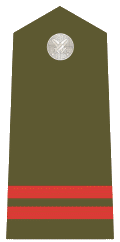
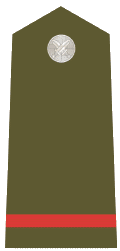
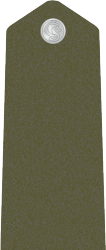
Rank group	Senior NCOs				Junior NCOs			Enlisted
Czechoslovak Army (1945–1948)
Czechoslovak Army (1945–1948)	Štábní praporčík	Praporčík	Štábní rotmistr	Rotmistr	Rotný	Četař	Desátník	Svobodník	Vojín
Czechoslovak Army (1949–1950)
Czechoslovak Army (1949–1950)				Rotmistr	Rotný	Četař	Desátník	Svobodník	Vojín

== Ranks (1951–1959) ==
=== Officers ===
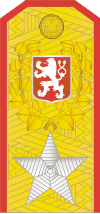
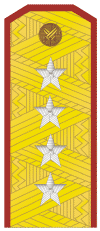
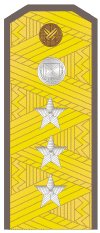
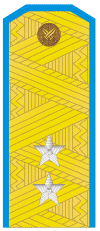
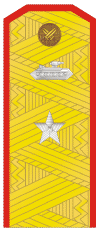
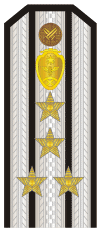
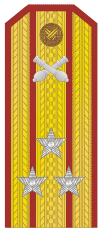
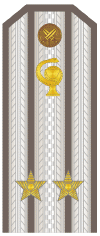
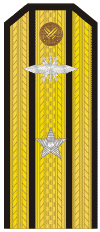
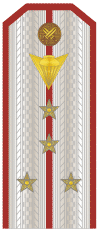
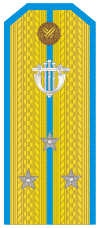
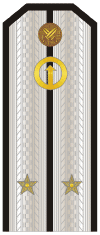
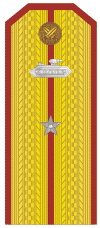
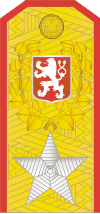
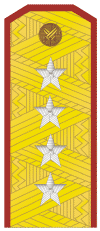
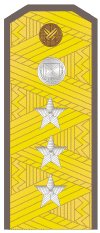
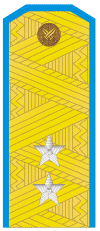
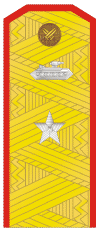
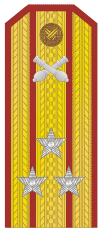
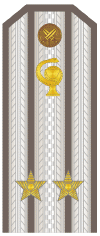
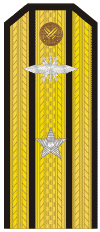
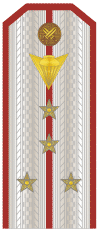
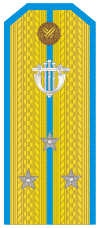
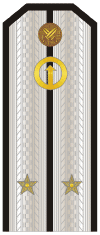
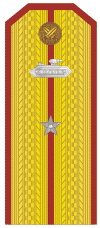
Rank group	General / flag officers					Senior officers				Junior officers
(Czechoslovakia) Czechoslovak People's Army (1951–1952)
(Czechoslovakia) Czechoslovak People's Army (1951–1952)	Vrchní velitel branné moci	Armádní generál	Sborový generál	Divisní generál	Brigádní generál	Plukovník	Podplukovník	Major	Štábní kapitán	Kapitán	Nadporučík	Poručík	Podporučík
(Czechoslovakia) Czechoslovak People's Army (1953–1959)
(Czechoslovakia) Czechoslovak People's Army (1953–1959)	Vrchní velitel branné moci	Armádní generál	Generálporučík	Generálmajor	Brigádní generál	Plukovník	Podplukovník	Major		Kapitán	Nadporučík	Poručík	Podporučík

=== Other ranks ===
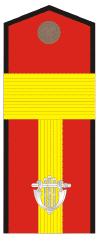
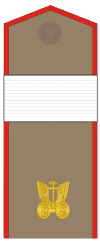
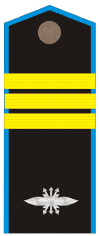
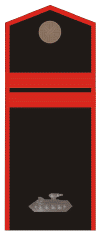
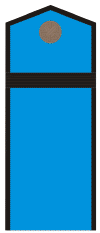
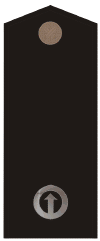
Rank group	Senior NCOs	Junior NCOs		Enlisted
(Czechoslovakia) Czechoslovak People's Army
(Czechoslovakia) Czechoslovak People's Army	Staršina	Rotný	Četař	Desátník	Svobodník	Vojín

Note: The different colour variants of the epaulettes, rank and edging distinguish different corps.

== Ranks (1960–1990) ==
=== Officers ===
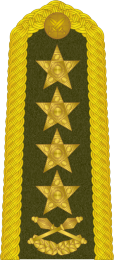
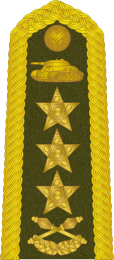
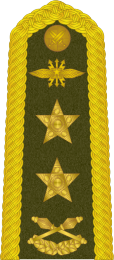
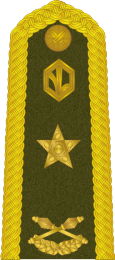
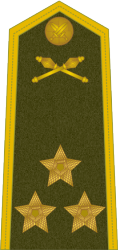
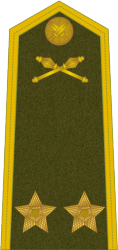
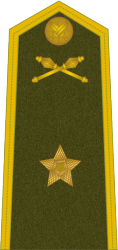
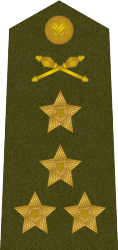
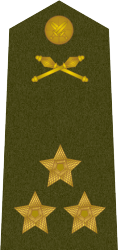
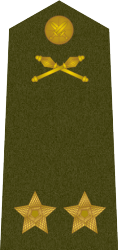
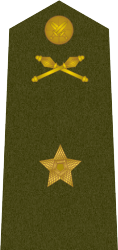
Rank group	General / flag officers				Senior officers			Junior officers
(Czechoslovakia) Czechoslovak People's Army
(Czechoslovakia) Czechoslovak People's Army	Armádní generál	Generálplukovník	Generálporučík	Generálmajor	Plukovník	Podplukovník	Major	Kapitán	Nadporučík	Poručík	Podporučík

=== Warrant officers, NCOs and enlisted ===
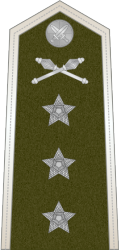
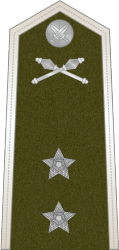
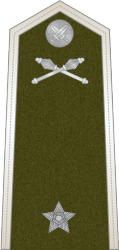
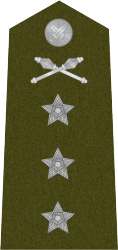
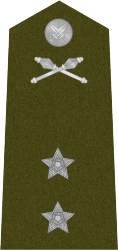
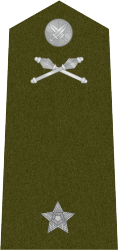
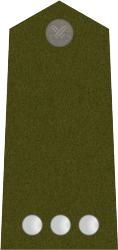
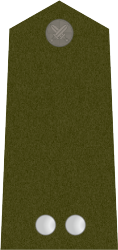
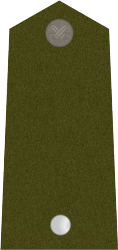
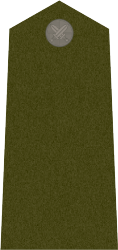
Rank group	Warrant officers			NCOs			Enlisted
(Czechoslovakia) Czechoslovak People's Army
(Czechoslovakia) Czechoslovak People's Army	Nadpraporčík	Praporčík	Podpraporčík	Nadrotmistr	Rotmistr	Rotný	Četař	Desátník	Svobodník	Vojín

== See also ==
- Government Army (Bohemia and Moravia)
- Czech military ranks (current form)
