= Wenceslaus =

Wenceslaus, Wenceslas, Wenzeslaus and Wenzslaus (and other similar names) are Latinized forms of the Czech name Václav. The other language versions of the name are German: Wenzel, Polish: Wacław, Więcesław, Wieńczysław, Spanish: Wenceslao, Portuguese: Venceslau, Russian: Vyacheslav, Croatian: Vjenceslav, Lithuanian: Vaclavas, Vaclovas, Venclovas among others. It originated as a Latin spelling for Czech rulers. It is a Slavic dithematic name (of two lexemes), derived from the Slavic words veli/vyache/więce/više ("great(er), large(r)"), and slava ("glory, fame") – both very common in Slavic names – and roughly means "greater glory". Latinised name Wenceslaus corresponds to several West Slavic, Lechitic given names, such as Wieceslaw, Wiecejslav, Wieńczysław/Vienceslav, Węzel, Wacław and a few more. In Lithuanian there is also the form Venckus, but only as a surname.

People named Wenceslaus or spelling variations thereof include:

- Wenceslaus I, Duke of Bohemia (907–935 or 929), saint and subject of the Christmas carol "Good King Wenceslas"
- Wenceslaus II, Duke of Bohemia (died 1192)
- Wenceslaus I of Bohemia (c. 1205–1253), King of Bohemia
- Wenceslaus II of Bohemia (1271–1305), grandson of Wenceslaus I, King of Bohemia and Poland
- Wenceslaus III of Bohemia (1289–1306), son of Wenceslaus II, King of Hungary, Bohemia, and Poland
- Wenceslaus IV of Bohemia (1361–1419), great-grandson of Wenceslaus II, King of Bohemia, and German King
- Charles IV, Holy Roman Emperor (1316–1378), born Wenceslaus
- Wenceslaus I of Legnica (c. 1318–1364)
- Wenceslaus I, Duke of Luxembourg (1337–1383), the first Duke
- Wenceslaus Hanka (1791–1861), Czech philologist
- Wenceslaus Hollar (1607–1677), Czech etcher
- Vaclavas Kidykas (born 1961), Lithuanian discus thrower
- Venceslaus Agrippa Lituanus (c. 1525–c.1597), Lithuanian writer and diplomat
- Venceslaus Ulricus Hammershaimb (1819–1909), Faroese minister and linguist

== See also ==
- Boleslaus, cognate
- Ventsislav, Bulgarian variant
- Višeslav, South Slavic cognate
