= Václav =

Václav (Czech pronunciation: [ˈvaːtslaf]) or rarely Vácslav is a Czech male given name. It is among the most common Czech names. The Latinised form of the name is Wenceslaus and the Polish form of the name is Wacław. The name was derived from the old Czech name Veceslav, meaning 'more famous'. Nicknames are Vašek, Vašík, Venca, Venda.

The Latinised form is used in English for Czech kings and some other early modern notable people. The people listed below are Czech unless otherwise noted. Notable people with the name include:

== Nobility ==
- Wenceslaus I, Duke of Bohemia (kníže Václav I.; 907–935 or 929), saint
- Wenceslaus II, Duke of Bohemia (kníže Václav II.; died 1192)
- Wenceslaus I of Bohemia (Václav I.; c. 1205–1253), King of Bohemia
- Wenceslaus II of Bohemia (Václav II.; 1271–1305), King of Bohemia and Poland
- Wenceslaus III of Bohemia (Václav III.; 1289–1306), King of Hungary, Bohemia and Poland
- Wenceslaus IV of Bohemia (Václav IV.; 1361–1419), King of Bohemia and German King
- Wenceslaus II, Duke of Opava (Václav II. Opavský; c. 1397 – c. 1446), duke
- Wenceslaus I, Duke of Luxembourg (Václav Lucemburský; 1337–1383), first Duke of Luxembourg
- Václav Eusebius František, Prince of Lobkowicz (1609–1677), Bohemian nobleman, military leader and diplomat

== Arts and entertainment ==
- Václav Noid Bárta (born 1980), singer, songwriter and actor
- Václav Binovec (1892–1976), film director and screenwriter
- Václav Brožík (1851–1901), painter
- Václav Černý (writer) (1905–1987), writer and philosopher
- Václav Čtvrtek (1911–1976), writer and philosopher
- Václav Glazar (1952–2018), actor
- Wenceslaus Hollar (Václav Hollar; 1607–1677), etcher
- Václav Hrabě (1940–1965), poet and writer
- Václav Jamek (born 1949), writer and translator
- Václav Jiráček (born 1978), actor
- Václav Jírů (1910–1980), photographer and writer
- Václav Kaplický (1895–1982), writer, journalist and poet
- Václav Kliment Klicpera (1792–1859), playwright and poet
- Václav Kopta (born 1965), actor
- Václav Lohniský (1920–1980), actor
- Václav Luks, musician, conductor, musicologist and pedagogue
- Václav Marhoul (born 1960), film director and screenwriter
- Václav Neckář (born 1943), singer and actor
- Václav Nelhýbel (1919–1996), Czech-American composer
- Václav Neumann (1920–1995), conductor, violinist and viola player
- Václav Neužil (born 1979), actor
- Vašo Patejdl (born Václav Patejdl; 1954–2023), Slovak singer and composer
- Václav Postránecký (1943–2019), actor
- Václav Renč (1911–1973), poet and dramatist
- Václav Řezáč (1901–1956), writer
- Václav Talich (1883–1961), conductor and violinist
- Václav Trégl (1902–1979), actor
- Václav Trojan (1907–1983), composer and arranger
- Václav Vorlíček (1930–2019), film director
- Václav Vydra (1876–1953), actor
- Václav Vydra (born 1956), actor
- Václav Wasserman (1898–1967), screenwriter, actor and director
- Jan Václav Voříšek (1791–1825), composer and pianist
- Josef Václav Myslbek (1848–1922), sculptor

== Sport ==
- Václav Černý (footballer) (born 1997), footballer
- Václav Daněk (born 1960), footballer
- Václav Drobný (1980–2012), footballer
- Václav Finěk (born 2010), chess player
- Václav Kadlec (born 1992), footballer
- Václav Jemelka (born 1995), footballer
- Václav Jurečka (born 1994), footballer
- Václav Koloušek (born 1976), footballer
- Václav Mašek (born 1941), footballer
- Václav Němeček (born 1967), footballer
- Václav Nestrašil (born 2007), ice hockey player
- Václav Pilař (born 1988), footballer
- Václav Procházka (born 1984), footballer
- Václav Prospal (born 1975), ice hockey player and coach
- Václav Svěrkoš (born 1983), footballer
- Václav Varaďa (born 1976), ice hockey player and coach

== Other ==
- Václav Hanka (1791–1861), philologist
- Václav Havel (1936–2011), politician and writer, President of Czechoslovakia (1989–1992) and the Czech Republic (1993–2003)
- Václav Holek (1886–1954), firearm engineer
- Václav Jelínek (1944–2022), Czechoslovak spy
- Václav Jícha (1914–1945), World War II flying ace
- Václav Klaus (born 1941), politician and economist, President of the Czech Republic (2003–2013)
- Václav Klement (1868–1938), entrepreneur, industrialist and automotive pioneer
- Václav Matěj Kramerius (1753–1808), publisher and journalist
- Václav Laurin (1865–1930), engineer, industrialist and automotive pioneer
- Václav Morávek (1904–1942), brigadier general and member of the anti-Nazi resistance
- Vaclav Smil (born Václav Smil 1943), Czech-Canadian scientist and policy analyst
- Václav Vacek (1877–1960), politician

== See also ==
- Boleslaus
- Bolesław (given name), includes Boleslav
