= Wacław =

Wacław is a Polish masculine given name. It is a borrowing of Czech: Václav, Latinized as Wenceslaus.

For etymology and cognates in other languages, see Wenceslaus.

It may refer to:

- Wacław Cimochowski (1912–1982), Polish philologist
- Wacław Gajewski (1911–1997), Polish geneticist
- Wacław Hański (1782–1841), Polish nobleman
- Wacław Kiełtyka (born 1981), Polish musician
- Wacław Kopisto (1911–1993), Polish Army officer
- Wacław Kuchar (1897–1981), Polish athlete
- Wacław Leszczyński (1605–1666), Primate of Poland
- Wacław Maciejowski (1792–1883), Polish historian
- Wacław Micuta (1915–2008), Polish economist
- Wacław Seweryn Rzewuski (1784–1831), Polish explorer, poet and orientalist
- Wacław Sieroszewski (1858–1945), Polish writer
- Wacław Sierpiński (1882–1969), Polish mathematician
- Wacław Szybalski (1921–2020), Polish-American medical researcher, geneticist
- Wacław Szymanowski (1859–1930), Polish sculptor and painter
- Wacław of Szamotuły (c. 1520 – c. 1560), Polish composer
- Wacław Zagórski (1909–1982), Polish lawyer
- Wacław Michał Zaleski (1799–1849), Polish poet and writer
- Wacław Zalewski (1917–2016), Polish engineer
- Wacław Zawadowski (1891–1982), Polish painter

Other forms of Wenceslaus exist natively in Polish, but only as a surname, including Wącław, Węcław, and Więcław, as well as their respective phonetic spellings Woncław, Wencław, and Wiencław.
