= Venceslau =

Venceslau is a masculine given name found in Angola, Brazil and Portugal. It is cognate to the Latin name Wenceslaus.

Notable people with the name include:

- Venceslau Brás (1868–1966), 9th President of Brazil
- Venceslau de Lima (1858–1919), Portuguese geologist, paleontologist, viticulturist, and politician
- Venceslau de Morais (1854–1929), Portuguese writer
- Venceslau Fernandes (born 1945), Portuguese cyclist
- André Venceslau Macanga (born 1978), Angolan footballer and coach
- Samara Venceslau Carneiro (born 2006), Brazilian footballer
