= Wenzl (surname) =

Wenzl is a surname. Notable people with the surname include:

- Josef Wenzl (born 1984), German cross country skier
- Richard Wenzl (died 1957), German World War I flying ace

== See also ==
- Wenzel
- Wentzel
