= Wentzel =

Wentzel and Wentzell are surnames, and may refer to:

== Wentzel ==
- Emil Wentzel (c. 1817–1892), timber merchant and politician in South Australia
- Gregor Wentzel (1898–1978), German physicist
- Stan Wentzel (1917–1991), Major League Baseball player
- Sune Wentzel (born 1971), Norwegian frisbee player
- Uta Wentzel (born 1979), German politician
- Volkmar Wentzel (1915–2006), American photographer

Wentzel may also refer to:

- Wentzel–Kramers–Brillouin approximation

== Wentzell ==
- Alexander D. Wentzell (born 1937), Russian-American mathematician
- Fritz Wentzell (1899–1948), highly decorated German military leader during World War II

Wentzell may also refer to:

- Freidlin–Wentzell theorem, a statistics tool relating to Brownian motion
