= Omeyer & Thori =

American architectural partnership

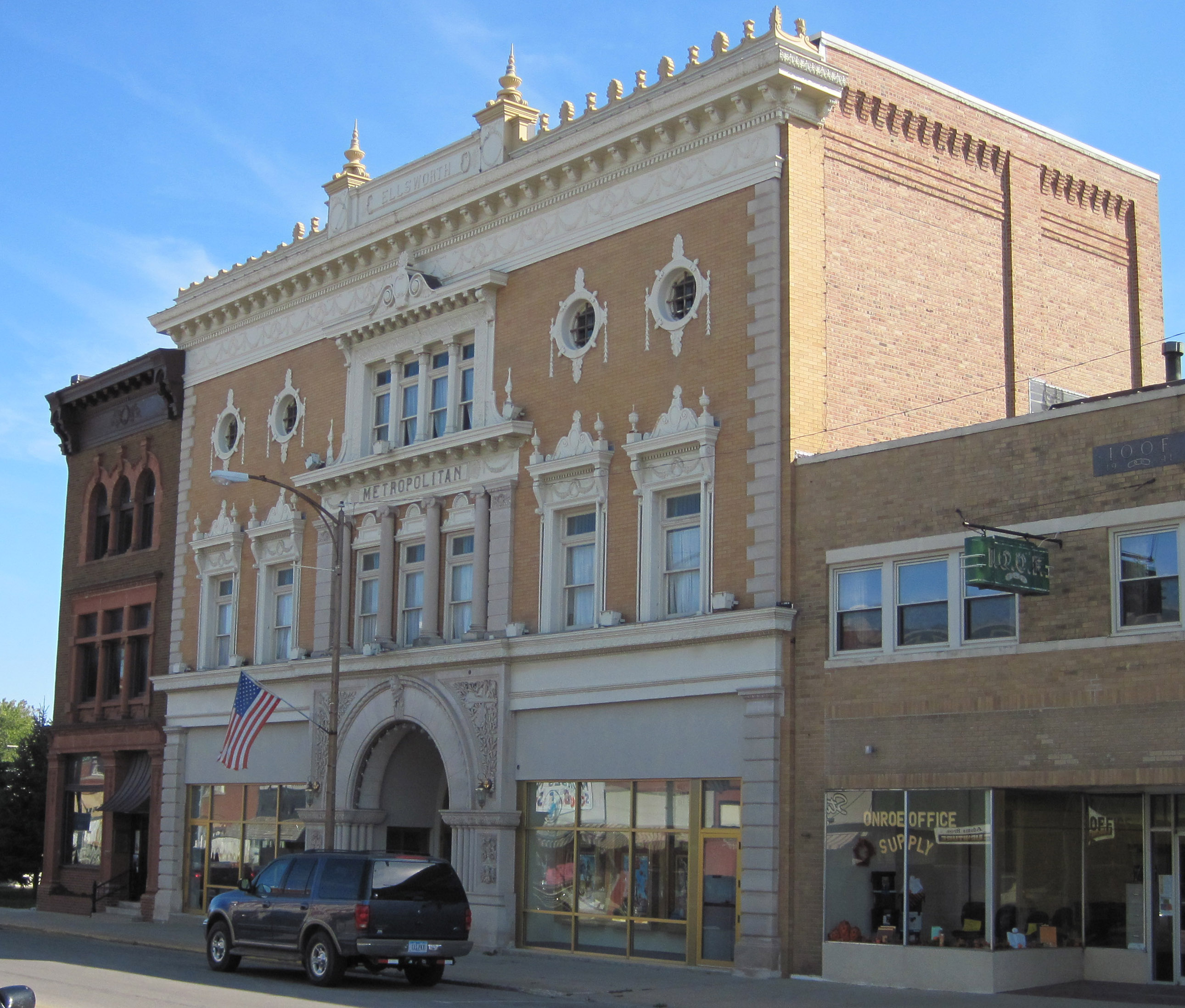
Metropolitan Opera House (Iowa Falls, Iowa)

Omeyer & Thori was an architectural partnership of Diedrik A. Omeyer (1850-1907) and Martin P. Thori (1864-1905). The two were immigrants from Norway.

Headquartered in St Paul, a number of the firm's and its individual partners' works are listed on the National Register of Historic Places.

By 1905, Omeyer had retired from the firm due to disability and Thori was suffering from tuberculosis; in January 1905 the firm was renamed Thori, Alban & Fisher with the promotion of William L. Alban (1873-1961) and James E. Fisher to a named partners. Thori died from tuberculosis in February 1905.

Works include (with attribution):

- William H. and Ida Garland House, 846 W. Fairmount Ave., St. Paul "a typically florid production of Norwegian Americans Omeyer and Thori"
- Arcadia Free Public Library, 406 E. Main St. Arcadia, WI (Omeyer, Diedrik A.), NRHP-listed
- Bank of Long Prairie, 262 Central Ave. Long Prairie, MN (Omeyer & Thori), NRHP-listed
- Old Main (Augsburg University), 731 21st Ave., S. Minneapolis, MN (Omeyer, Didrik A.; Thori, Martin P.), NRHP-listed
- Norman County Courthouse, 16 E.3rd Ave. Ada, MN (Omeyer & Thori), NRHP-listed
- Old Main, Augustana Academy, Lawler and Second Sts. Canton, SD (Omeyer & Thori), NRHP-listed
- Park Region Luther College, 715 W. Vernon Ave. Fergus Falls, MN (Omeyer & Thori), NRHP-listed
- Steensland Library-St. Olaf College, Off St. Olaf Ave. Northfield, MN (Omeyer & Thori), NRHP-listed
- United Church Seminary, 2481 Como Ave. St. Paul, MN (Omeyer, Didrik A.; Thori, Martin P.), NRHP-listed
- Ada Village Hall, 404 W. Main St. Ada, MN Thori, Martin P., et al.
- William E. Coleman House, 500 Missouri Ave. Deer Lodge, MT Ameryre & Thorie
- Cottonwood County Courthouse, 900 3rd Ave. Windom, MN Omeyer & Thori
- Metropolitan Opera House (Iowa Falls, Iowa), 515 Washington St. Iowa Falls, IA Omeyer & Thori
- Nerstrand City Hall, Main St. Nerstrand, MN Thori, Alban, & Fisher
- Steensland Library-St. Olaf College, Off St. Olaf Ave. Northfield, MN Omeyer & Thori
- One or more works in Northwood Central Avenue Historic District, roughly, Central Ave. W near 5th St. to 9th St. on the East Northwood, IA (Omeyer & Thori), NRHP-listed
