= Worth County Courthouse =

Worth County Courthouse may refer to:

- Worth County Courthouse (Georgia), Sylvester, Georgia
- Old Worth County Courthouse (Iowa), Northwood, Iowa
- Worth County Courthouse (Iowa), Northwood, Iowa
- Worth County Courthouse (Missouri), Grant City, Missouri
