= Ada Village Hall =

Historic building in Ada, Minnesota, US

- U.S. National Register of Historic Places
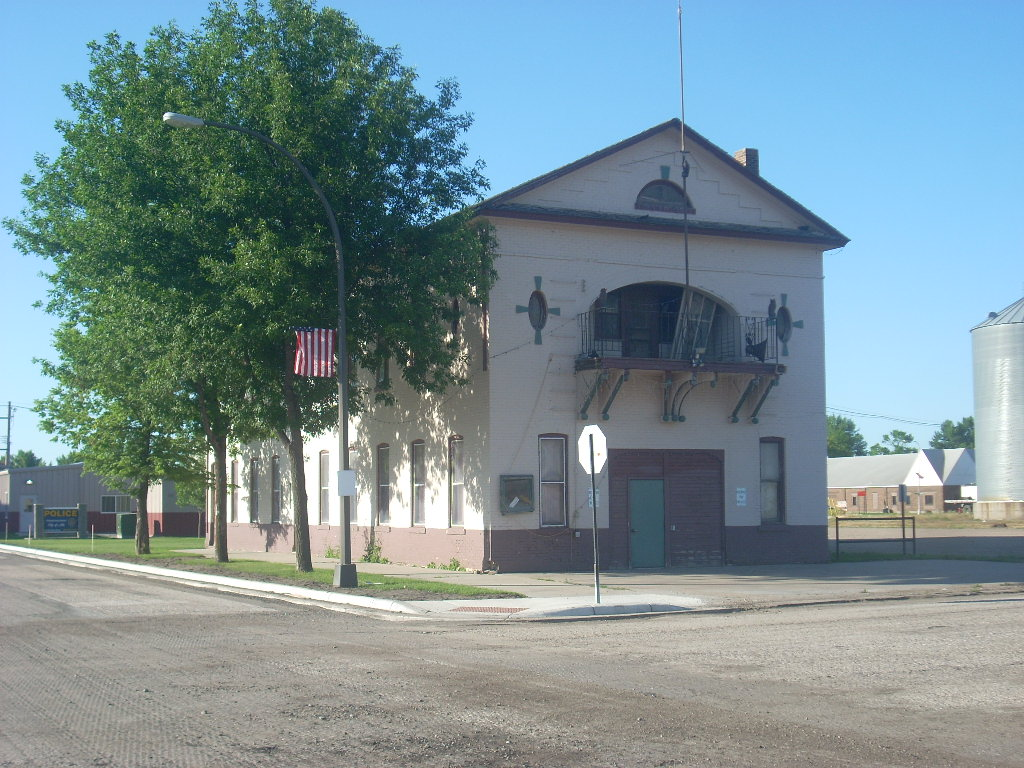
- Ada Village Hall from the south

- Location within Minnesota Location within the United States
- Location: 404 West Main Street; Ada, Minnesota
- Coordinates: 47°18′0″N 96°30′59.8″W
- Area: Less than one acre
- Built: 1903–04
- Built by: H.L. Larson
- Architect: Omeyer & Thori
- Architectural style: Neoclassical
- NRHP reference No.: 98000154
- Added to NRHP: February 26, 1998

Ada Village Hall is the former center for local government in Ada, Minnesota, United States. Completed in 1904, it was also an important public meeting hall and social facility through the 1970s. Architecturally, the building is an excellent example of the combined city hall and fire hall buildings that were constructed in Minnesota during the early 20th century. It was listed on the National Register of Historic Places for having local significance to politics/government and social history.

== History ==
The Village of Ada was founded in 1876. It was platted as a railroad town and served as a hub for transporting wheat from the Red River Valley to market. In 1881 the Village of Ada was incorporated and became the seat of Norman County. By the beginning of the twentieth century the town was expanding quickly. In 1904 civic improvements were made, which included the Village Hall. It was built to replace the previous village hall and fire hall that had been constructed shortly after 1881.

The hall was built during the spring and summer of 1904 and completed by October 1904. It was constructed of brick made at Ada's only brickyard. The formal, Neoclassical styling of the hall was meant to symbolize the democratic principles, strength, and order of American government. Built for approximately $6,000, it was a modest structure in comparison to other major construction in Ada during the period. The Ada Village Hall was one of three major public buildings in Ada that were designed by Omeyer and Thori. The firm also designed the Norman County Courthouse and the Ada High School. The firm designed hundreds of buildings in Minnesota and other midwestern states.

The entire city bureaucracy was located on the first floor of the building. The Ada Fire Department was headquartered in the hall until 1965. The police office and jail were located in the northern corner of the building until the 1970s. All local elections except school board elections were also held in the building. The Ada Village Hall was the principal public gathering place in Ada for many decades. The Ada Commercial Club and several other organizations held their meetings in the Hall. Most community functions, special events, and meetings were held in the second floor meeting room. There was a large assembly room, a kitchen, a dining area, and a small meeting room on the second floor that served the public. Meetings and events were held in one of the rooms on the second floor nearly every night of the week from 1904 through the 1970s. A portion of the building was used as a public library for nearly forty-five years. The library was established around 1914 by the Commercial Club and was operated by the Ada Public Library beginning in 1941. In 1959 the library was moved to the Zion Lutheran Church building.

The second floor of the Ada Village Hall was no longer used by the early 1980s. The First State Bank of Ada constructed a new building that included a community room. Most community organizations moved to that location. During the 1990s the second floor of the city hall was closed to the public. In 1998 the hall was added to the National Register of Historic Places. The first floor of the hall continued to serve as the city government offices until 2010. In 2012 a local retailer occupied the building but went out of business. As of 2014 renovation of the building was postponed due to the prohibitive cost.

== See also ==
- List of city and town halls in the United States
- National Register of Historic Places listings in Norman County, Minnesota
