= Congregational Church of Ada =

Historic church in Minnesota, United States

- U.S. National Register of Historic Places
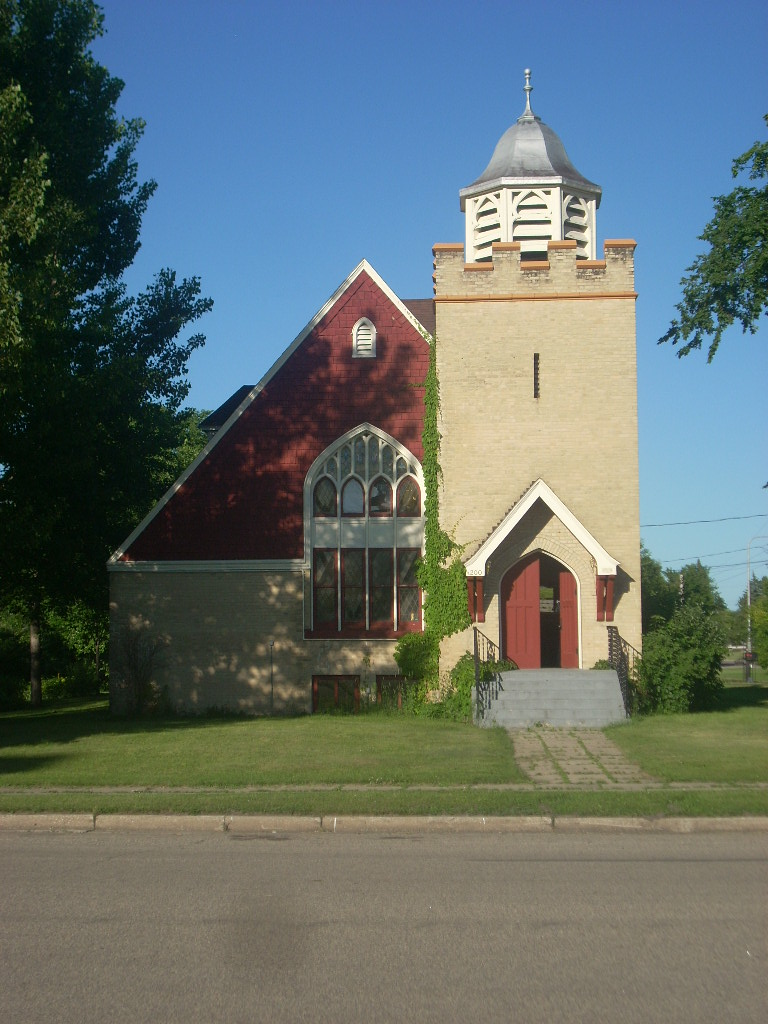

- Location within Minnesota Location within the United States
- Location: E. 2nd Ave. and 1st St., Ada, Minnesota
- Coordinates: 47°17′53.76″N 96°30′44.43″W
- Area: less than one acre
- Built: 1900
- Architect: Charles Waterbury
- Architectural style: Bungalow/craftsman, Queen Anne
- NRHP reference No.: 84000236
- Added to NRHP: November 8, 1984

The Congregational Church of Ada is a historic church on E. 2nd Avenue and 1st Street in Ada, Minnesota, United States. Designed by Charles Waterbury, a brother-in-law of congregation member Fred Hampson, it was built in 1900 for a cost of $6,000 to serve the needs of a congregation meeting in a schoolhouse at the time. When it was dedicated on December 25, 1900, Rev. H. William Stiles was the first pastor to serve in that building, the first brick church in Ada.

Edward F. Wheeler, pastor from 1886 to 1890, helped acquire the church bell by writing to his mother in New England and informing her of their need. She enlisted the aid of several churches in her vicinity to secure the money necessary and sent it to her son.

In April, 1938, it was discovered that bees had made a home in the belfry. A beekeeper was called in to smoke out the bees. A large quantity of honey was revealed, which was canned by the Ladies' Aid after being extracted from the combs. Nearly a hundred quarts were obtained and sold to the local stores.

On June 5, 1970, the congregation voted to combine with the United Methodist Church of Ada and form a new congregation, Faith United Church, whose building would be built on the west side of Ada on Hwy. 200. Their current building was donated to the Norman County Historical Society who housed their museum there until the Flood of 1997.

Rev. Rudolf J. Stohler was the last pastor to serve in this building.

In 1984, the Norman County Historical Society applied for and were granted approval to the National List of Historic Places.

Prior to designing this church, Charles Waterbury had attended MIT and graduated in 1895. He became a member of the American Institute of Architects in 1909 and after working in Chicago, he moved to Washington D.C. in 1918. In May 1918 he became an Army Captain and served in the Construction Division of the Army as Chief until his death in October of that year.
