= Worth County Courthouse (Iowa) =

- U.S. National Register of Historic Places
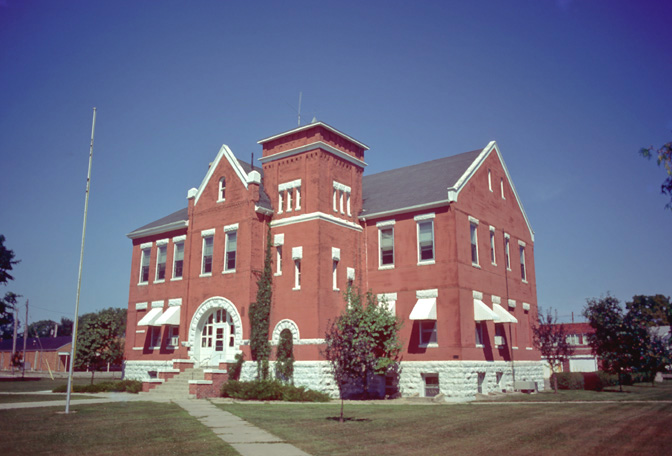

- Location within Iowa Location within the United States
- Interactive map showing the location for Worth County Courthouse
- Location: Central Ave. between 10th and 11th Sts. Northwood, Iowa
- Coordinates: 43°26′40″N 93°13′3″W
- Area: less than one acre
- Built: 1893
- Built by: S. Road
- Architect: H.R.P. Hamilton
- Architectural style: Romanesque
- MPS: County Courthouses in Iowa TR
- NRHP reference No.: 81000705
- Added to NRHP: July 2, 1981

Worth County Courthouse in Northwood, Iowa was built in 1893 in a Romanesque style. It was listed on the National Register of Historic Places (NRHP) in 1981. The building is the second courthouse for the county and it was completed in 1893. It was constructed in brick and features a small tower. The building was enlarged and remodeled in 1938.

== History ==
The first courthouse was built in 1879 with a contributed total of $5,075 with construction finishing in 1880. Before the courthouse was finished, it was agreed that the land upon which the courthouse was built could be subdivided among the people who participated in the erection of the courthouse if the land went back to the original owners and that the only way that the courthouse can be moved is if there is a written majority consensus from the contributors to move it. The first courthouse was made out of bricks and was considered plain and only $4,400 of the contributed sum was used to build it.

== Current courthouse ==
Built following an election which resulted in Northwood remaining the county seat and completed in 1893, the current courthouse is made out of brick and has a base made out of limestone. It includes a small tower with no clock, however, it once included a taller roof and sharply-pointed gablets. Out of the donated $5,000 only $4,594 was used to build the courthouse. The first tower was replaced and the entire courthouse renovated in 1938. A Civil War cannon is on the grounds of the courthouse that was erected by the Worth County Sesquicentennial Commission in 1996. The carriage of the cannon was manufactured at the Northwood Foundry while the rest of the cannon was manufactured at the Fort Pitt Foundry. The cannon is an 1861 columbiad. The cannon used to be located on the north bank of Shell Rock River. An expansion of the courthouse in 1990 included new offices, a new jail, and a conference room. The significance of the courthouse is derived from its association with county government, and the political power and prestige of Northwood as the county seat.

== See also ==
- Old Worth County Courthouse (Northwood, Iowa), also NRHP-listed and in Northwood
