= Will Berzinski =

American football player (1934–1994)

No. 33
- Position: Halfback

Personal information
- Born: July 18, 1934; Arcadia, Wisconsin, U.S.
- Died: March 4, 1994 (aged 59); Rochester, Minnesota, U.S.
- Listed height: 6 ft 2 in (1.88 m)
- Listed weight: 195 lb (88 kg)

Career information
- High school: Arcadia
- College: Wisconsin-La Crosse
- NFL draft: 1956: 4th round, 46th overall pick

Career history
- Philadelphia Eagles (1956); Toronto Argonauts (1957)

Career NFL statistics
- Rushing yards: 72
- Rushing average: 4.8
- Receptions: 3
- Receiving yards: 35
- Stats at Pro Football Reference

Will Berzinski (July 18, 1934 – March 4, 1994) was a halfback in the National Football League (NFL). He was drafted in the fourth round of the 1956 NFL draft by the Los Angeles Rams and would play that season with the Philadelphia Eagles.
