= Arcadia Free Public Library =

- U.S. National Register of Historic Places
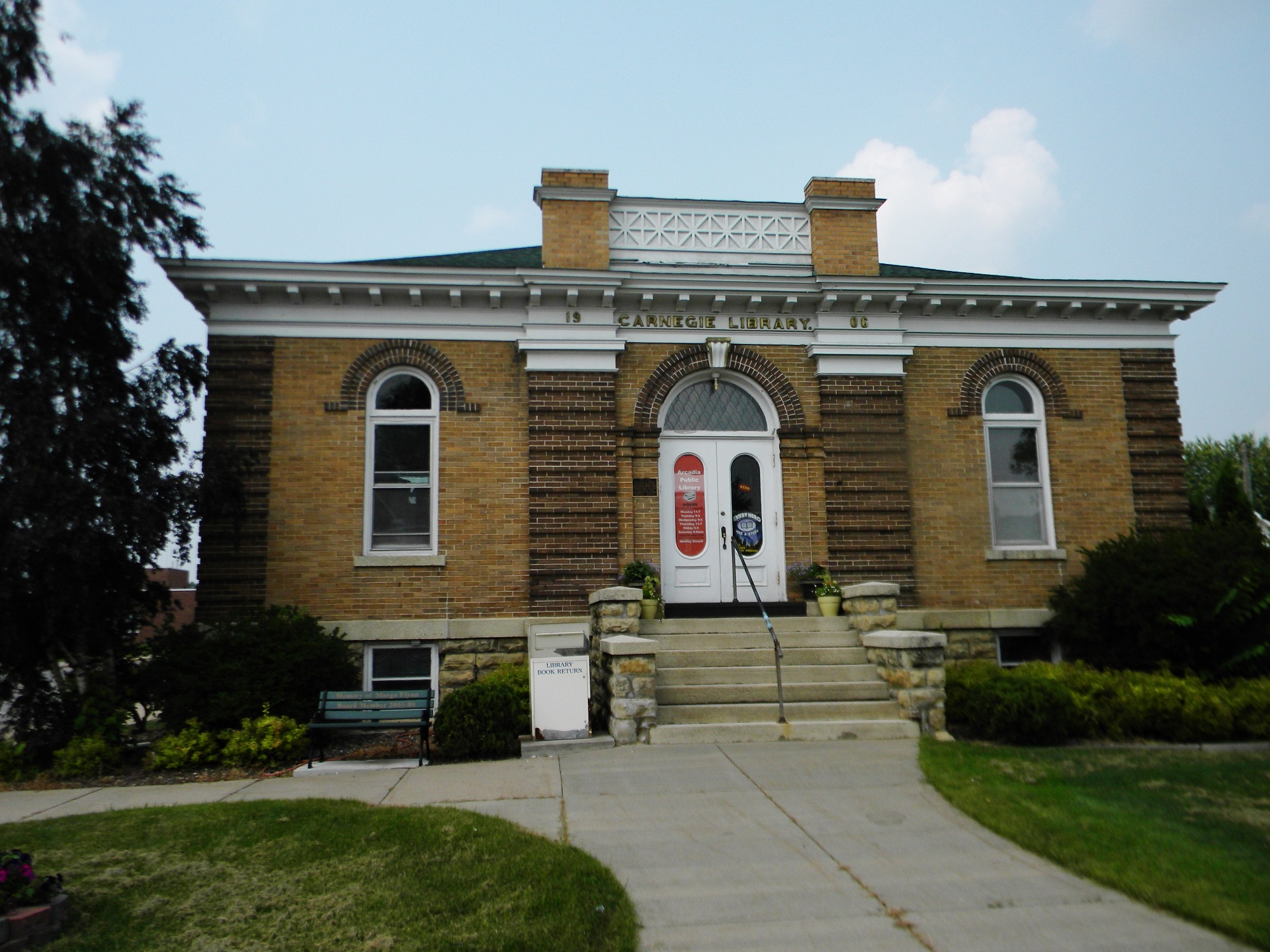

- Location within Wisconsin Location within the United States
- Interactive map showing the location for Arcadia Free Public Library
- Location: 406 East Main Street, Arcadia, Wisconsin
- Coordinates: 44°15′8″N 91°29′44″W
- Area: less than one acre
- Built: 1906
- Built by: Charles Sweet
- Architect: Diedrik A. Omeyer
- Architectural style: Classical Revival
- MPS: Public Library Facilities of Wisconsin MPS
- NRHP reference No.: 94000388
- Added to NRHP: April 29, 1994

The Arcadia Free Public Library is a Carnegie library serving Arcadia, Wisconsin. The city's library service was established in 1899 through a donation from State Senator Levi Withee and was originally based in the city hall. The Carnegie Foundation funded a library building for the city in 1905, and the library was built the following year. The building was designed by Diedrik A. Omeyer in the Classical Revival style. The library still serves the city; as it is located across the street from Arcadia's high school and elementary school, it has extensively served both schools throughout its history. On April 29, 1994, the library was added to the National Register of Historic Places.
