= Cottonwood County Courthouse =

- U.S. National Register of Historic Places
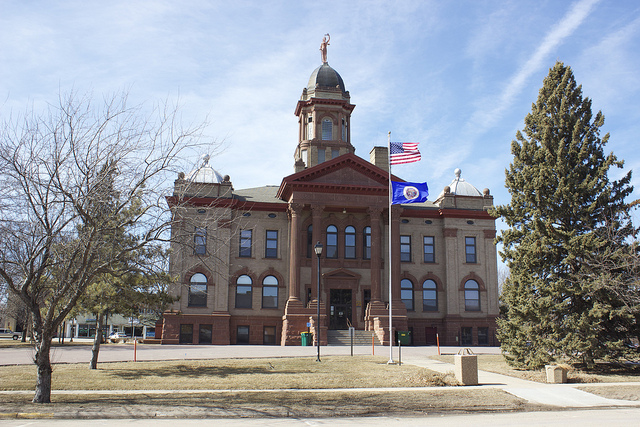
- The Cottonwood County Courthouse viewed from the east

- Location within Minnesota Location within the United States
- Interactive map showing the location for Cottonwood County Courthouse
- Location: 900 3rd Avenue, Windom, Minnesota
- Coordinates: 43°51′57.5″N 95°7′1″W
- Area: 1 acre (0.40 ha)
- Built: 1904–05
- Built by: Jacob B. Nelson
- Architect: Omeyer & Thori
- Architectural style: Neoclassical/Renaissance Revival
- NRHP reference No.: 77000728
- Designated: April 18, 1977

The Cottonwood County Courthouse is the seat of government for Cottonwood County, Minnesota, United States, located in the city of Windom. It has been in continual use since its dedication in 1905. It was listed on the National Register of Historic Places in 1977 for its state-level significance in the themes of architecture and art. It was nominated for the neoclassicism expressed throughout the building, from the exterior architecture to the interior design and artwork.

== Origin ==
On July 29, 1870, the Minnesota Legislature legally organized Cottonwood County. Its county commission first gathered to do their administrative work at a house in Big Bend, a small community six miles (10 km) northwest of the future site of Windom. Since the commissioners lacked a permanent building where they could meet and store their paperwork, meeting in private homes was common.

As the county's population grew and demands on the judicial and governmental systems increased, local officials recognized the need to consolidate both people and paperwork, and residents began to call for a permanent home. Big Bend, however, didn't meet the county's needs because it was six miles away from any hotels and businesses. The commissioners decided to name Windom, which had been platted on June 20, 1871, as the county seat—in part because it had been chosen as a stop on the St. Paul and Sioux City Railroad. Cottonwood County commissioners first met in Windom in January 1872.

Talk of building a courthouse continued for a decade without action because the county needed to reserve its funds for countering the devastation caused by Rocky Mountain locusts between 1873 and 1877. In the meantime, Cottonwood County rented various structures in Windom to house the first government offices. By 1883, a wooden structure that met the county's needs was built. A decade later, however, it was too small, and local citizens talked about building a centrally located courthouse that would serve a population of 30,000.

== Construction ==
The Cottonwood County commissioners toured four states to select an architect for the new courthouse. By November 1903, they chose the firm of Omeyer & Thori of Saint Paul. By March 1904, they awarded the construction contract to J. B. Nelson and Company, contractors in Mankato, for the sum of $59,994 (equivalent to $2,149,785 in 2025). Work began in April 1904 and the cornerstone was laid in July 1904. In October 1904, Odin J. Oyen of La Crosse, Wisconsin, who specialized in ecclesiastical decoration, received a contract to supervise the building's interior decoration.

As construction progressed, costs soared past the original estimate to $100,000 (equivalent to $3,583,333 in 2025), including interiors, when the county took advantage of a new state program that granted loans for the construction of courthouses. By August 1905 the building was complete. A dedication ceremony was held on November 3, 1905, with Governor John Johnson delivering the primary speech.

This event brought crowds to Windom to admire the new building, which consisted of two stories of red sandstone and brick set upon a rusticated basement. It combined elements of the Neoclassical and Renaissance Revival styles and included a central domed atrium which rose through the two upper stories and provided access to offices and chambers. In the second floor courtroom, Oyen executed the gold-leaf-embellished mural of "Justice" which was patterned after the painting of the same name in the Palais de Justice, Paris.

Between 1905 and 1909 work continued on the courthouse's grounds and interior. Sidewalks, gutters, and curbs were eventually completed. In 1927 professional landscapers planted 597 shrubs and trees.

== Later use ==
Cottonwood County commissioners approved the first courthouse remodeling project in 1930, in part because of the need to accommodate new female voters, jurors, and staff inside the building. The jury room was remodeled and additional restroom space for women was added.

The next major remodeling project occurred during the Great Depression. A number of new governmental agencies were created which required space. During World War II, additional agencies were created to deal with new crises. The basement was remodeled to give agents more room. In 1977, the Cottonwood County Courthouse was placed in the National Register of Historical Places.

This pattern of modernization and reparation has continued until the present day. Elevators to aid the disabled and a musical dome that chimes every day are two of the more notable modern improvements. Through all the changes, the Cottonwood County Courthouse has remained a historical gem and a source of pride for the people of the county.

== See also ==
- List of county courthouses in Minnesota
- National Register of Historic Places listings in Cottonwood County, Minnesota
