= Bank of Long Prairie =

- U.S. National Register of Historic Places
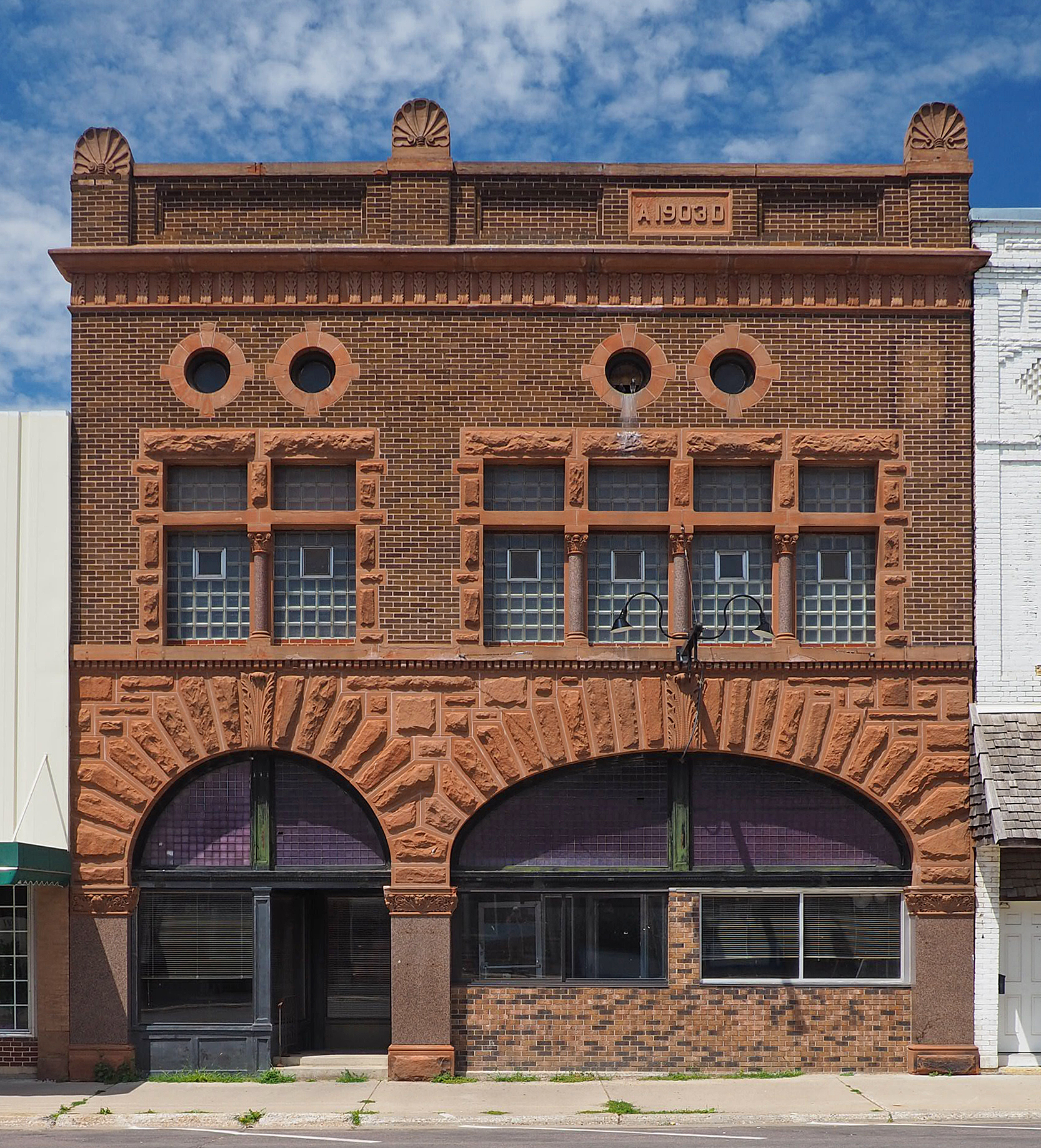
- The Bank of Long Prairie from the south

- Location within Minnesota Location within the United States
- Location: 262 Central Avenue, Long Prairie, Minnesota
- Coordinates: 45°58′27.5″N 94°51′40″W
- Area: Less than one acre
- Built: 1903
- Architect: Omeyer & Thori
- Architectural style: Romanesque/Classical Revival
- NRHP reference No.: 85001994
- Designated: September 5, 1985

The Bank of Long Prairie is a former bank building in Long Prairie, Minnesota, United States. It was built in 1903 as the new headquarters of Todd County's first and largest bank, established in 1881. The building was listed on the National Register of Historic Places in 1985 for having local significance in the themes of architecture and commerce. It was nominated for its Romanesque/Classical Revival design by Omeyer & Thori and for playing a key financial role in the development of Long Prairie and Todd County.

== See also ==
- National Register of Historic Places listings in Todd County, Minnesota
