= Old Worth County Courthouse (Iowa) =

- U.S. National Register of Historic Places
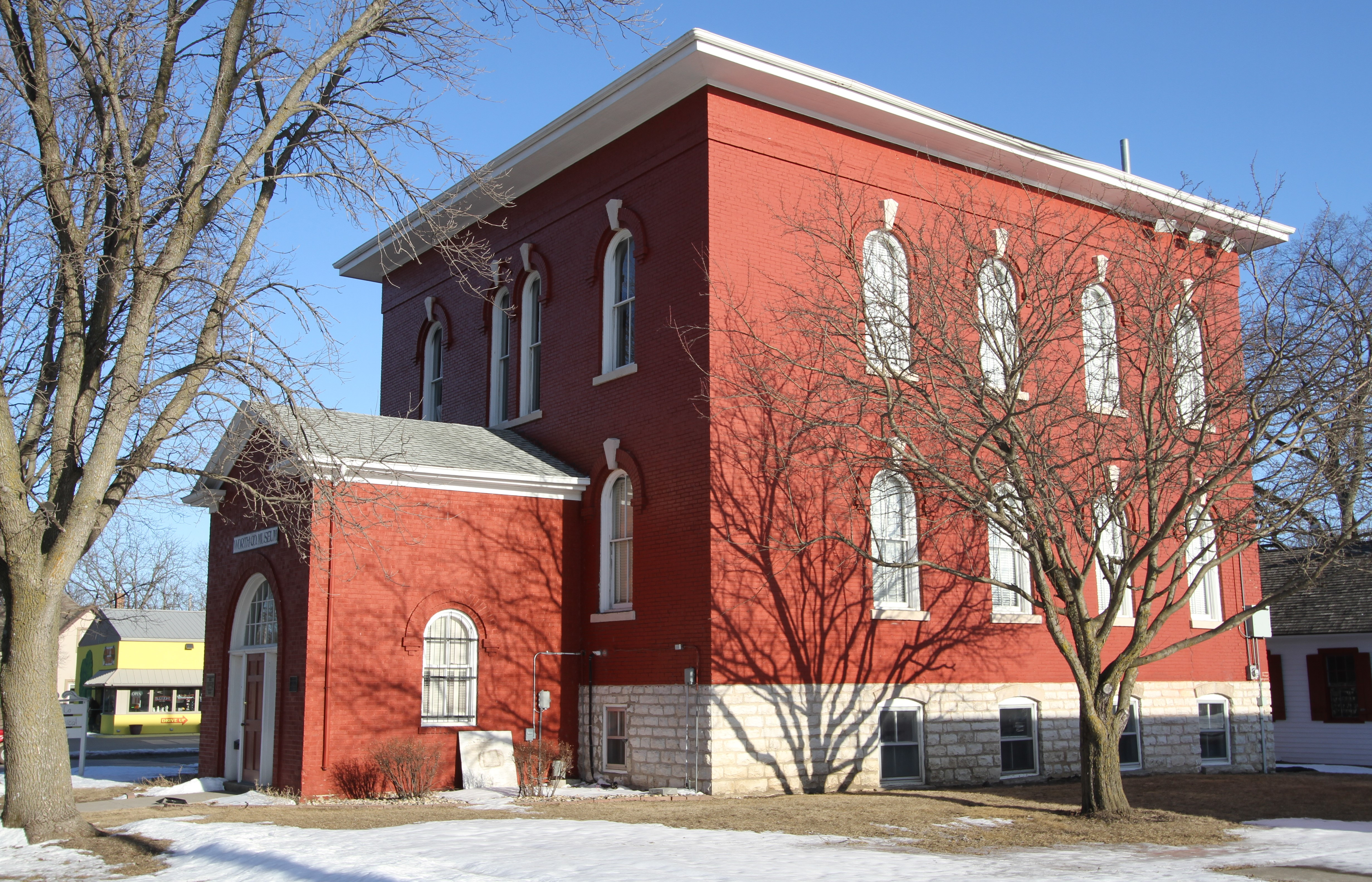
- The building from the west in 2018

- Location within Iowa Location within the United States
- Location: 921 Central Ave. Northwood, Iowa
- Coordinates: 43°26′38″N 93°13′7″W
- Area: less than one acre
- Built: 1880
- Built by: Simon Larsen
- Architectural style: Italianate
- MPS: County Courthouses in Iowa TR
- NRHP reference No.: 81000276
- Added to NRHP: July 2, 1981

The Old Worth County Courthouse in Northwood, Iowa, United States, was built in 1880. It was listed on the National Register of Historic Places in 1981 as a part of the County Courthouses in Iowa Thematic Resource. The courthouse was the first building the county used for court functions and county administration. The building functions as the main museum for the Worth County Historical Society.

== History ==
In 1879 an attempt was made by Kensett, Iowa to have the county seat of Worth County moved to their town. To ensure that the county seat stayed in Northwood the town raised the money for the courthouse and donated the land for the building. A brick Italianate style building was built by Simon Larsen in 1880 for $4,400 It was replaced in 1893 by the present courthouse.

After its use as a courthouse, the building served as a high school for twenty years. After that, it was used as a public library on the main floor and as a youth center on the second floor. On July 4, 1973, the Worth County Historical Society opened a museum in the building.

== Architecture ==
The former courthouse in two-stories in height, and capped with a hipped roof. It features round arch windows with brick hoods and a keystone. The entrance vestibule in the front was added in the 1920s. The significance of the courthouse is derived from its association with county government, and the political power and prestige of Northwood as the county seat. It is also one of the few courthouses in Iowa that was built in the Italianate style, and one of the few former county courthouses that remain standing.

== See also ==
- Worth County Courthouse (Iowa)
