= Ada, Minnesota =

City in Minnesota, United States

- City
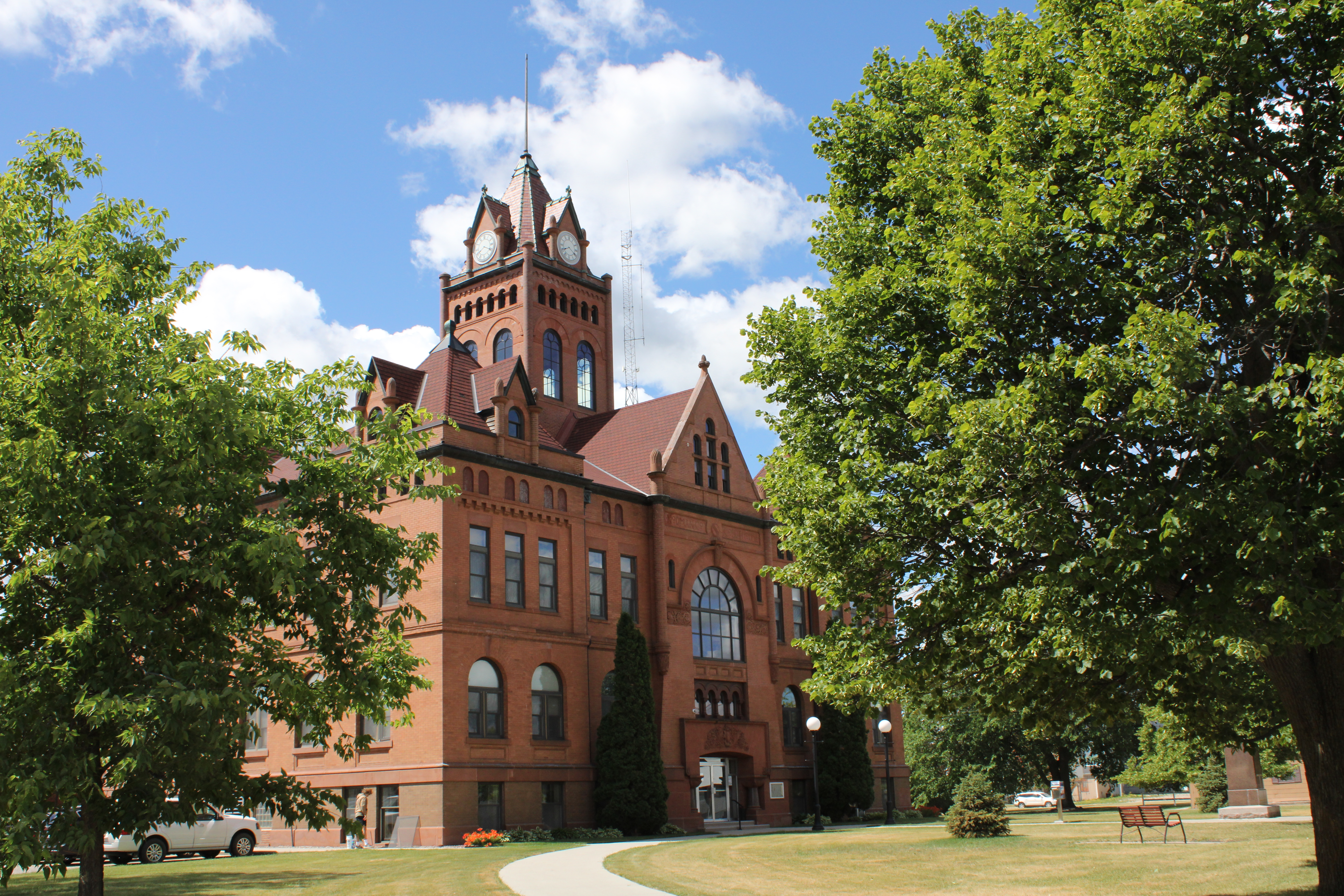
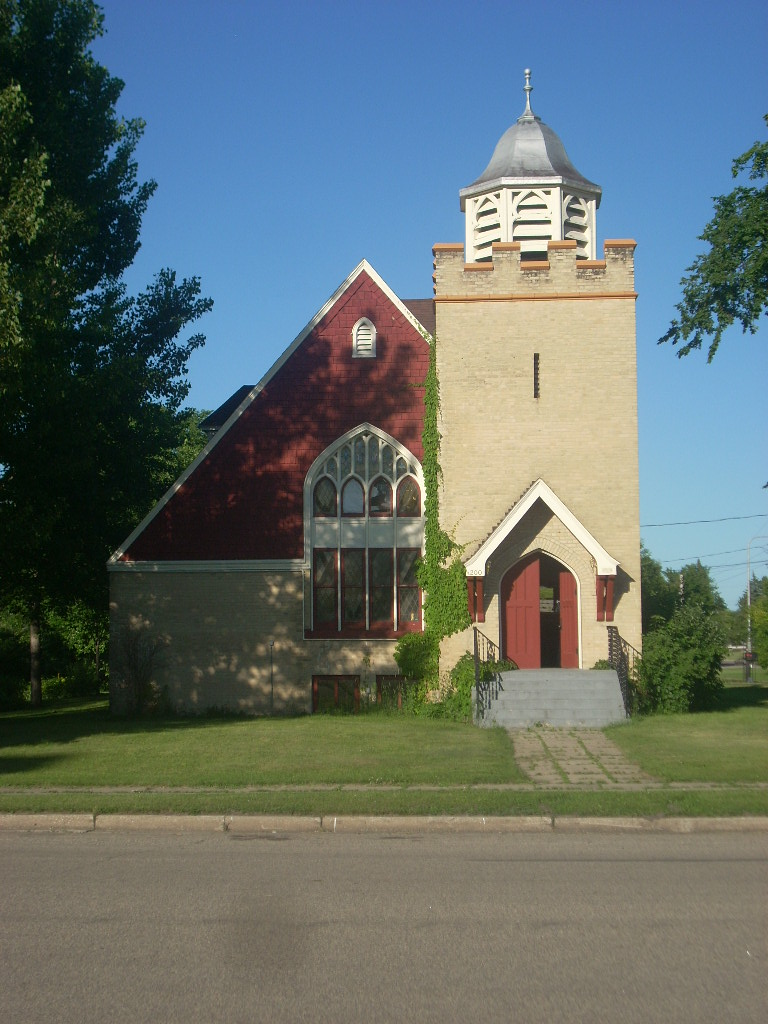
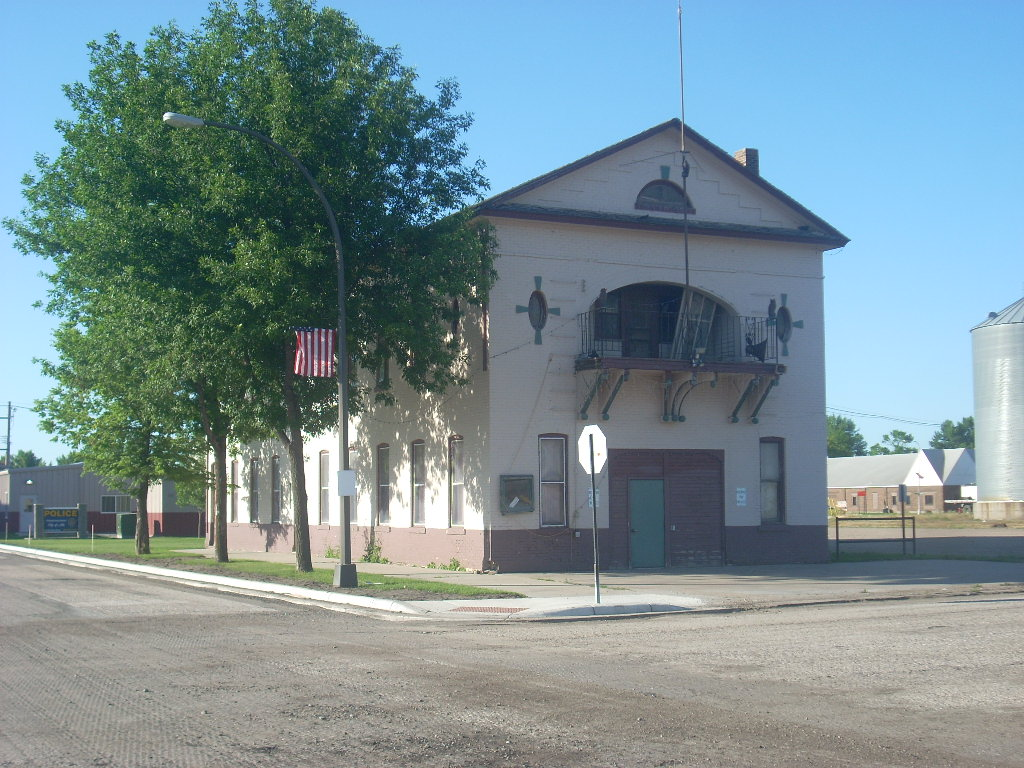
- Norman County Courthouse Congregational Church of Ada Ada Village Hall
- Nickname: "Heart of the Valley"
- Motto: Alive and Thriving!
- Location of Ada within Norman County and state of Minnesota
- Coordinates: 47°17′55″N 96°30′57″W
- Country: United States
- State: Minnesota
- County: Norman
- Founded: 1874
- Incorporated: February 9, 1881

Government
  - Mayor: John Hintz

Area
  - Total: 1.34 sq mi (3.47 km^{2})
  - Land: 1.34 sq mi (3.47 km^{2})
  - Water: 0 sq mi (0.00 km^{2})
- Elevation: 906 ft (276 m)

Population (2020)
  - Total: 1,740
  - Estimate (2022): 1,719
  - Density: 1,297.6/sq mi (501.01/km^{2})
- Time zone: UTC−6 (Central (CST))
  - Summer (DST): UTC−5 (CDT)
- ZIP Code: 56510
- Area code: 218
- FIPS code: 27-00172
- GNIS feature ID: 0639200
- Sales tax: 7.375%
- Website: adamn.gov

Ada (/ˈeɪdə/ AY-də) is a city in Norman County, Minnesota, United States. The population was 1,740 at the 2020 census. It is the county seat.

== History ==
Ada was laid out in 1874 and incorporated on February 9, 1881. It was named in honor of a daughter of William H. Fisher (the namesake of Fisher, Minnesota), of St. Paul, then attorney and superintendent of the St. Paul and Pacific Railroad, under whose superintendency this line of the Red River Valley was constructed. A post office has been in operation at Ada since 1876. As Norman County grew in the 1880s, they were outgrowing their current space being used as a county courthouse in Ada, and erecting a new building was on the horizon. At the time, Norman County was bigger than today, with Twin Valley roughly at the geographic center. Starting in 1900, Twin Valley worked to rally support behind the goal of building the new courthouse there, turning it into the county seat as well. Two petitions and one vote later, Ada won the challenge. In 1906, it became a moot point when Mahnomen County was formed, shrinking Norman County and making Ada the geographic center.

== Geography ==
According to the United States Census Bureau, the city has a total area of 1.39 square miles (3.60 km^{2}), all land.

Minnesota State Highways 9 and 200 are two of the main routes in the city.

=== Climate ===
Climate data for Ada, Minnesota (1991–2020 normals, extremes 1892–present)
Month	Jan	Feb	Mar	Apr	May	Jun	Jul	Aug	Sep	Oct	Nov	Dec	Year
Record high °F (°C)	53 (12)	65 (18)	78 (26)	100 (38)	107 (42)	104 (40)	111 (44)	104 (40)	101 (38)	99 (37)	76 (24)	60 (16)	111 (44)
Mean daily maximum °F (°C)	16.0 (−8.9)	20.8 (−6.2)	34.9 (1.6)	52.8 (11.6)	67.2 (19.6)	76.7 (24.8)	80.7 (27.1)	79.7 (26.5)	70.9 (21.6)	54.8 (12.7)	36.6 (2.6)	22.3 (−5.4)	51.1 (10.6)
Daily mean °F (°C)	6.1 (−14.4)	10.0 (−12.2)	24.5 (−4.2)	41.2 (5.1)	54.4 (12.4)	64.9 (18.3)	68.7 (20.4)	66.9 (19.4)	58.2 (14.6)	43.8 (6.6)	27.6 (−2.4)	13.4 (−10.3)	40.0 (4.4)
Mean daily minimum °F (°C)	−3.9 (−19.9)	−0.8 (−18.2)	14.1 (−9.9)	29.5 (−1.4)	41.6 (5.3)	53.2 (11.8)	56.8 (13.8)	54.0 (12.2)	45.5 (7.5)	32.8 (0.4)	18.5 (−7.5)	4.5 (−15.3)	28.8 (−1.8)
Record low °F (°C)	−48 (−44)	−53 (−47)	−39 (−39)	−12 (−24)	12 (−11)	27 (−3)	30 (−1)	31 (−1)	17 (−8)	−6 (−21)	−35 (−37)	−42 (−41)	−53 (−47)
Average precipitation inches (mm)	0.78 (20)	0.66 (17)	1.01 (26)	1.45 (37)	2.87 (73)	4.62 (117)	3.90 (99)	2.93 (74)	2.80 (71)	2.23 (57)	0.87 (22)	0.92 (23)	25.04 (636)
Average precipitation days (≥ 0.01 in)	6.4	7.1	6.3	6.7	10.7	12.0	9.0	8.1	8.4	8.4	6.1	7.7	96.9
Source: NOAA

== Demographics ==
Historical population
Census	Pop.	Note	%±
1880	138		—
1890	622		350.7%
1900	1,253		101.4%
1910	1,432		14.3%
1920	1,411		−1.5%
1930	1,285		−8.9%
1940	1,938		50.8%
1950	2,121		9.4%
1960	2,064		−2.7%
1970	2,076		0.6%
1980	1,971		−5.1%
1990	1,708		−13.3%
2000	1,657		−3.0%
2010	1,707		3.0%
2020	1,740		1.9%
2022 (est.)	1,719		−1.2%
U.S. Decennial Census; 2020 Census

=== 2020 census ===
As of the 2020 census, Ada had a population of 1,740. The median age was 41.7 years. 23.3% of residents were under the age of 18 and 21.4% of residents were 65 years of age or older. For every 100 females there were 95.9 males, and for every 100 females age 18 and over there were 90.3 males age 18 and over.

0.0% of residents lived in urban areas, while 100.0% lived in rural areas.

There were 751 households in Ada, of which 25.6% had children under the age of 18 living in them. Of all households, 41.5% were married-couple households, 20.0% were households with a male householder and no spouse or partner present, and 31.8% were households with a female householder and no spouse or partner present. About 38.2% of all households were made up of individuals and 18.4% had someone living alone who was 65 years of age or older.

There were 848 housing units, of which 11.4% were vacant. The homeowner vacancy rate was 1.8% and the rental vacancy rate was 14.5%.

Racial composition as of the 2020 census
Race	Number	Percent
White	1,600	92.0%
Black or African American	5	0.3%
American Indian and Alaska Native	25	1.4%
Asian	2	0.1%
Native Hawaiian and Other Pacific Islander	0	0.0%
Some other race	36	2.1%
Two or more races	72	4.1%
Hispanic or Latino (of any race)	97	5.6%

=== 2010 census ===
As of the census of 2010, there were 1,707 people, 742 households, and 436 families living in the city. The population density was 1,228.1 inhabitants per square mile (474.2/km^{2}). There were 837 housing units at an average density of 602.2 per square mile (232.5/km^{2}). The racial makeup of the city was 94.9% White, 0.2% African American, 1.1% Native American, 0.5% Asian, 1.4% from other races, and 1.9% from two or more races. Hispanic or Latino of any race were 5.6% of the population.

There were 742 households, of which 29.0% had children under the age of 18 living with them, 47.2% were married couples living together, 9.6% had a female householder with no husband present, 2.0% had a male householder with no wife present, and 41.2% were non-families. 37.6% of all households were made up of individuals, and 20.4% had someone living alone who was 65 years of age or older. The average household size was 2.22 and the average family size was 2.96.

The median age in the city was 43.9 years. 24.2% of residents were under the age of 18; 5.6% were between the ages of 18 and 24; 21.2% were from 25 to 44; 26.3% were from 45 to 64; and 22.6% were 65 years of age or older. The gender makeup of the city was 45.5% male and 54.5% female.

=== 2000 census ===
As of the census of 2000, there were 1,657 people, 749 households, and 432 families living in the city. The population density was 1,234.4 inhabitants per square mile (476.6/km^{2}). There were 835 housing units at an average density of 622.1 per square mile (240.2/km^{2}). The racial makeup of the city was 96.44% White, 0.06% African American, 0.66% Native American, 0.54% Asian, 1.03% from other races, and 1.27% from two or more races. Hispanic or Latino of any race were 2.78% of the population.

There were 749 households, out of which 26.7% had children under the age of 18 living with them, 50.2% were married couples living together, 5.5% had a female householder with no husband present, and 42.2% were non-families. 39.8% of all households were made up of individuals, and 24.4% had someone living alone who was 65 years of age or older. The average household size was 2.19 and the average family size was 2.98.

In the city, the population was spread out, with 24.5% under the age of 18, 5.9% from 18 to 24, 25.0% from 25 to 44, 20.0% from 45 to 64, and 24.5% who were 65 years of age or older. The median age was 41 years. For every 100 females, there were 88.1 males. For every 100 females age 18 and over, there were 82.9 male.

The median income for a household in the city was $29,583, and the median income for a family was $43,162. Males had a median income of $30,924 versus $23,088 for females. The per capita income for the city was $16,921. About 7.0% of families and 13.7% of the population were below the poverty line, including 14.5% of those under age 18 and 21.5% of those age 65 or over.

== Arts and culture ==
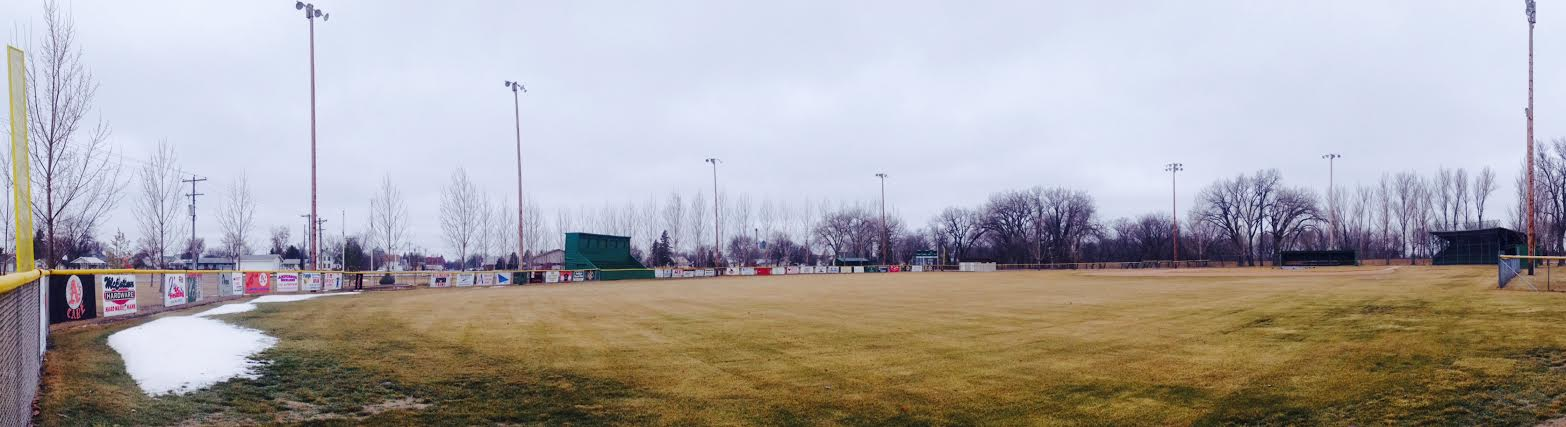
Municipal baseball stadium in Ada

Ada is home to the annual Norman County Fair. Held the last full weekend in June, the fair is a gathering place for the whole county. The Thomas Carnival along with many food stands come together for this annual event. 4-H, FFA bring their exhibits to display. There is entertainment daily in the Tommy Roesch Memorial Stage.

The Fun in the Flatlands celebration is held each fall, generally during the second weekend in September. The festival includes a parade, Pioneer Days at Prairie Village (a collection of historical buildings preserved as museums and located immediately west of the Norman County Fairgrounds), old time demonstrations, kids' games, food stands, a craft show, a produce market, a car show, entertainment, and more.

Ada hosts an Old-Fashioned Family Christmas each December, with highlights including a parade, opportunities for children to visit Santa and Mrs. Claus, free family movies at Ada's historic Orpheum Theatre, and an old-time snowmobile show.

Ada has three buildings listed in the National Register of Historic Places: Norman County Courthouse, Congregational Church of Ada, and Ada Village Hall.

== Education ==
Ada and neighboring community Borup (located approximately 8 miles south of Ada on Minnesota State Highway 9) are served by the Ada-Borup Schools. Both the elementary and high schools are located in Ada, following the closing of the Borup site in 2010. The elementary building serves preK-6 students and was built in 1978; the adjacent high school houses students in grades 7-12 and was constructed in 1998 following the devastating 1997 Red River flood, which destroyed the former 1953 building on Ada's east side. The district covers over 345 square miles and serves approximately 530 students.

The Ada-Borup Schools have a graduation rate near 98%, as well as a diverse offering of courses, including "College in the High School" classes. Further, Ada-Borup Secondary was awarded a bronze medal by U.S. News & World Report for three consecutive years, recognizing it among the nation's top high schools.

== Media ==
The Norman County Index is a weekly newspaper founded in 1883 and headquartered in Ada. It is published on Tuesdays and had a weekly circulation of 1,447 in 2019.

R&J Broadcasting operates the KRJB 106.5 FM radio station in Ada.

== Notable people ==
- Paul Kersey, actor, 1993-2003
