= Northwood Central Avenue Historic District =

Historic district in Iowa, United States

- Northwood Central Avenue; Historic District
- U.S. National Register of Historic Places
- U.S. Historic district
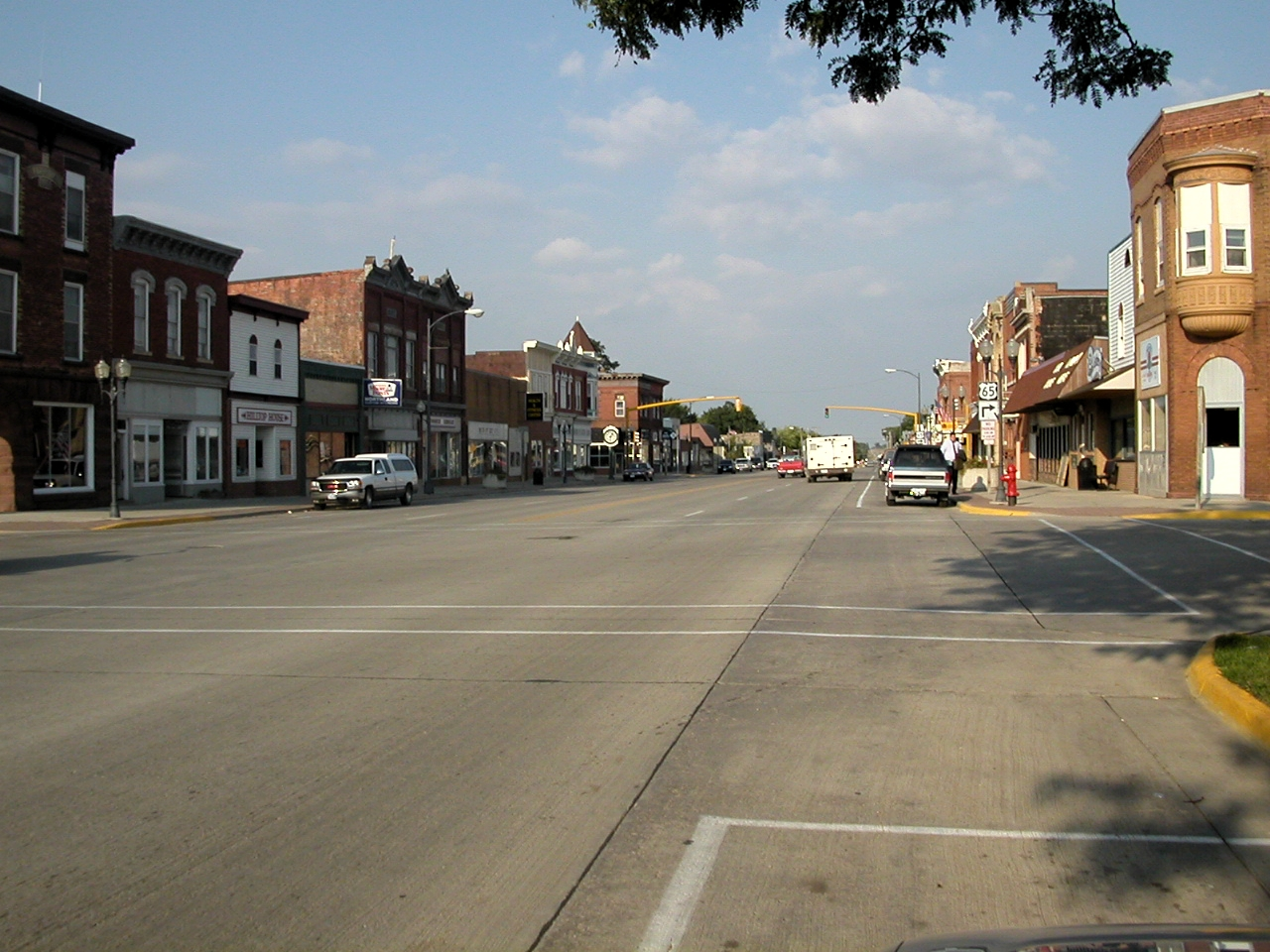

- Location within Iowa Location within the United States
- Location: Roughly Central Ave., W. near 5th St. to 9th St. on the east, Northwood, Iowa
- Coordinates: 43°26′46″N 93°13′22″W
- Area: 11.3 acres (4.6 ha)
- Architectural style: Late 19th & 20th Century Revivals
- MPS: Iowa's Main Street Commercial Architecture MPS
- NRHP reference No.: 06000857
- Added to NRHP: September 19, 2006

The Northwood Commercial Historic District encompasses most of the central business district along four blocks of Central Avenue in Northwood, Iowa, United States. It was listed on the National Register of Historic Places in 2006. The historic district includes 59 properties. It includes, as contributing properties, 40 buildings, one site, one structure, and three objects. There are also 14 buildings that are non-contributing.

The district contains both frame and brick structures that are from one to three stories tall. Significant structures were built in the Queen Anne and Italianate styles. Most of the buildings in the historic district were builder/contractor designed. In the late nineteenth and early twentieth centuries local builders H. Quandahl and James McQuarrie are associated with commercial construction. A few buildings, however, were the designs of trained architects. The Holland-Haraldson Block and the Odd Fellows-Erickson Block, were designed respectively by St. Paul, Minnesota architects Omeyer & Thori and J.L. Rood. Rood may have been designed the Index Building as well. The Emery Building was designed by Glenn L. Saxton and Hans Enger, who also had an office in St. Paul.

The site is its location adjacent to a bend on the north shore of the Shell Rock River. A staircase pathway that leads to flanking stone piers along the river are the contributing structure and one of the objects. The L.T. Dillon Clock and the Haugen Water Fountain are the other two contributing objects.
