= Arcadia, Wisconsin =

- City
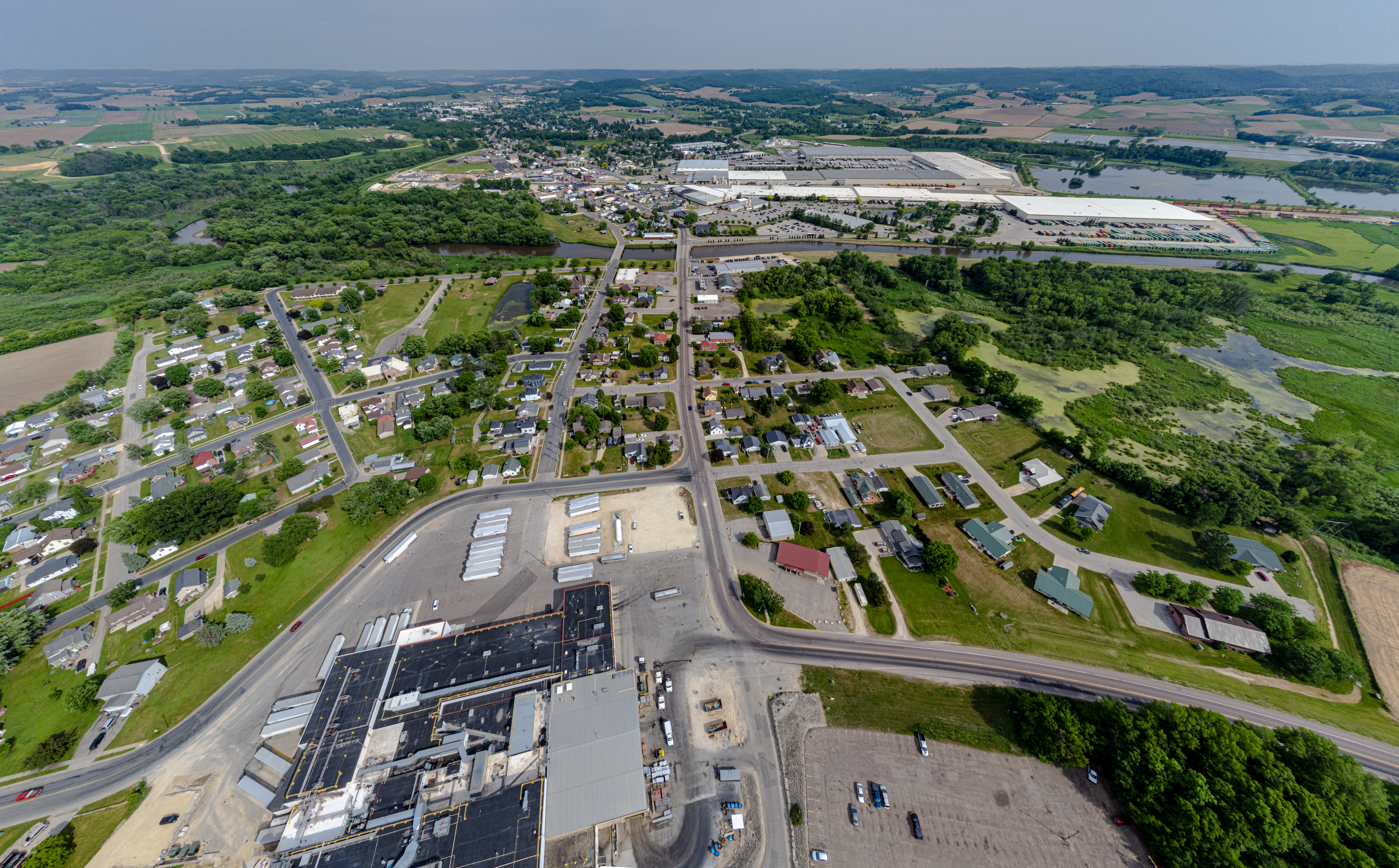

- Location of Arcadia in Trempealeau County, Wisconsin.

- Location within Wisconsin Location within the United States
- Coordinates: 44°15′7″N 91°29′42″W
- Country: United States
- State: Wisconsin
- County: Trempealeau

Government
  - City administrator: Chadwick Hawkins

Area
  - Total: 3.27 sq mi (8.47 km^{2})
  - Land: 3.27 sq mi (8.47 km^{2})
  - Water: 0 sq mi (0.00 km^{2})

Population (2020)
  - Total: 3,737
  - Density: 1,142.5/sq mi (441.1/km^{2})
- Time zone: UTC-6 (Central (CST))
  - Summer (DST): UTC-5 (CDT)
- ZIP codes: 54612
- Area code: 608
- FIPS code: 55-02500
- Website: Official website

Arcadia is a city in Trempealeau County, Wisconsin, United States, along the Trempealeau River. The population was 3,737 at the 2020 census. Arcadia is a Latino-majority city and the largest city in Trempealeau County.

== History ==
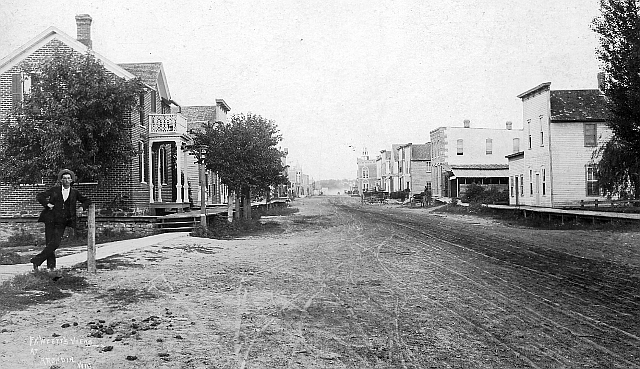
Arcadia, 1891

Arcadia was founded in 1855 on a hill overlooking the Trempealeau River Valley. However, when the Green Bay and Western Railroad built a line in the river valley, the city developed along the line. In 1858, David Massuere began work on a flour mill that was then finished in 1860. In 1900, the city built a Grist Mill For Michael Stelmach and John Kamla. In 1903 Korpal Valley School was moved to the Mill. Around the early 2010s the school building collapsed and was removed, yet the Mill still stands.

Arcadia's growth in the first decades of the 21st century has been fueled by the arrival of Hispanic and Latino immigrants. The immigrant population was targeted in a U.S. Immigration and Customs Enforcement raid in 2018. As of 2021, the city was home to about twenty Latino-owned small businesses.

== Geography ==
According to the United States Census Bureau, the city has a total area of 3.27 square miles (8.47 km^{2}), all land.

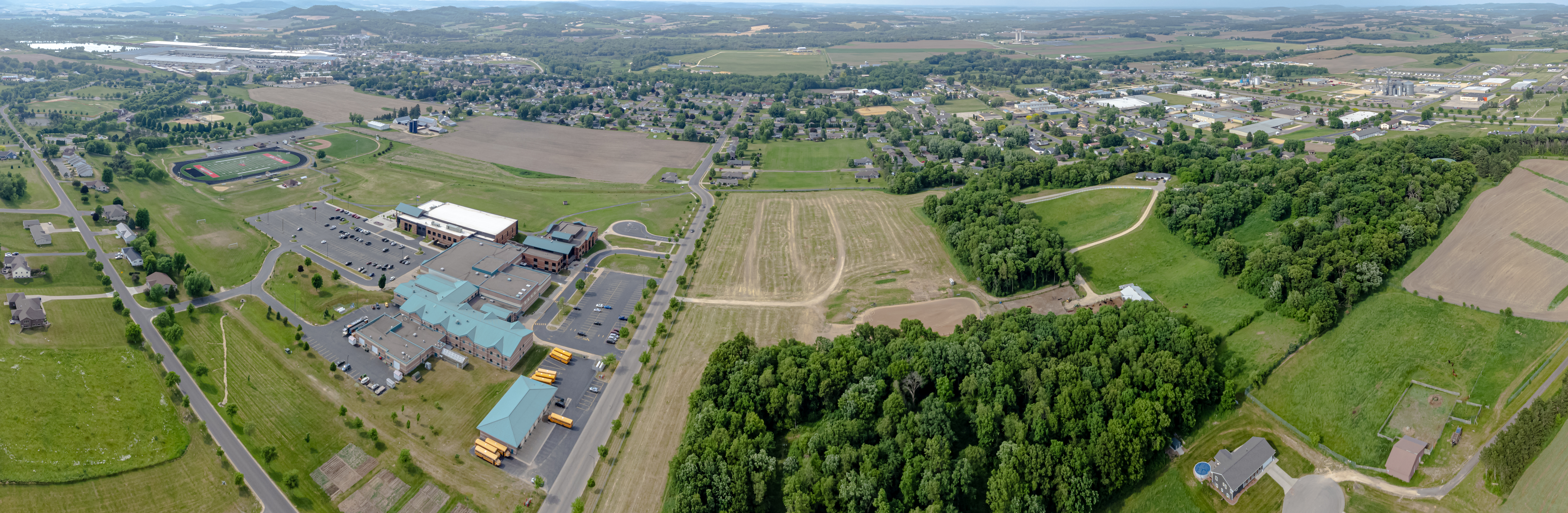
Arcadia, Wisconsin

== Demographics ==
Historical population
Census	Pop.	Note	%±
1880	665		—
1890	659		−0.9%
1900	1,273		93.2%
1910	1,212		−4.8%
1920	1,418		17.0%
1930	1,499		5.7%
1940	1,830		22.1%
1950	1,949		6.5%
1960	2,084		6.9%
1970	2,159		3.6%
1980	2,109		−2.3%
1990	2,166		2.7%
2000	2,402		10.9%
2010	2,925		21.8%
2020	3,737		27.8%
U.S. Decennial Census

=== 2020 census ===
As of the census of 2020, the population was 3,737. The population density was 1,142.5 inhabitants per square mile (441.1/km^{2}). There were 1,342 housing units at an average density of 410.3 per square mile (158.4/km^{2}). The racial makeup of the city was 40.7% White, 6.0% Native American, 0.4% Black or African American, 0.3% Asian, 44.0% from other races, and 8.7% from two or more races. Ethnically, the population was 63.6% Hispanic or Latino of any race.

According to the American Community Survey estimates for 2016–2020, the median income for a household in the city was $55,089, and the median income for a family was $63,636. Male full-time workers had a median income of $47,589 versus $36,994 for female workers. The per capita income for the city was $22,796. About 5.5% of families and 9.4% of the population were below the poverty line, including 6.8% of those under age 18 and 9.9% of those age 65 or over. Of the population age 25 and over, 83.1% were high school graduates or higher and 18.3% had a bachelor's degree or higher.

=== 2010 census ===
As of the census of 2010, there were 2,925 people, 1,114 households, and 649 families living in the city. The population density was 1,019.2 inhabitants per square mile (393.5/km^{2}). There were 1,207 housing units at an average density of 420.6 per square mile (162.4/km^{2}). The racial makeup of the city was 73.4% White, 0.8% African American, 0.3% Native American, 0.6% Asian, 22.8% from other races, and 2.1% from two or more races. Hispanic or Latino of any race were 31.2% of the population.

There were 1,114 households, of which 34.3% had children under the age of 18 living with them, 38.8% were married couples living together, 11.1% had a female householder with no husband present, 8.3% had a male householder with no wife present, and 41.7% were non-families. 32.4% of all households were made up of individuals, and 14.4% had someone living alone who was 65 years of age or older. The average household size was 2.55 and the average family size was 3.16.

The median age in the city was 32.9 years. 26.7% of residents were under the age of 18; 9% were between the ages of 18 and 24; 29.7% were from 25 to 44; 20.2% were from 45 to 64; and 14.3% were 65 years of age or older. The gender makeup of the city was 51.9% male and 48.1% female.

=== 2000 census ===
As of the census of 2000, there were 2,400 people, 1,038 households, and 594 families living in the city. The population density was 905.2 people per square mile (350.0/km^{2}). There were 1,112 housing units at an average density of 419.1 per square mile (162.0/km^{2}). The racial makeup of the city was 97.92% White, 0.12% Black or African American, 0.12% Native American, 0.25% Asian, 0.96% from other races, and 0.62% from two or more races. 3.08% of the population were Hispanic or Latino of any race.

There were 1,038 households, out of which 27.6% had children under the age of 18 living with them, 41.8% were married couples living together, 9.2% had a female householder with no husband present, and 42.7% were non-families. 35.9% of all households were made up of individuals, and 14.9% had someone living alone who was 65 years of age or older. The average household size was 2.23 and the average family size was 2.90.

In the city, the population was spread out, with 23.2% under the age of 18, 8.1% from 18 to 24, 30.9% from 25 to 44, 19.7% from 45 to 64, and 18.1% who were 65 years of age or older. The median age was 37 years. For every 100 females, there were 93.7 males. For every 100 females age 18 and over, there were 89.2 males.

== Economy ==
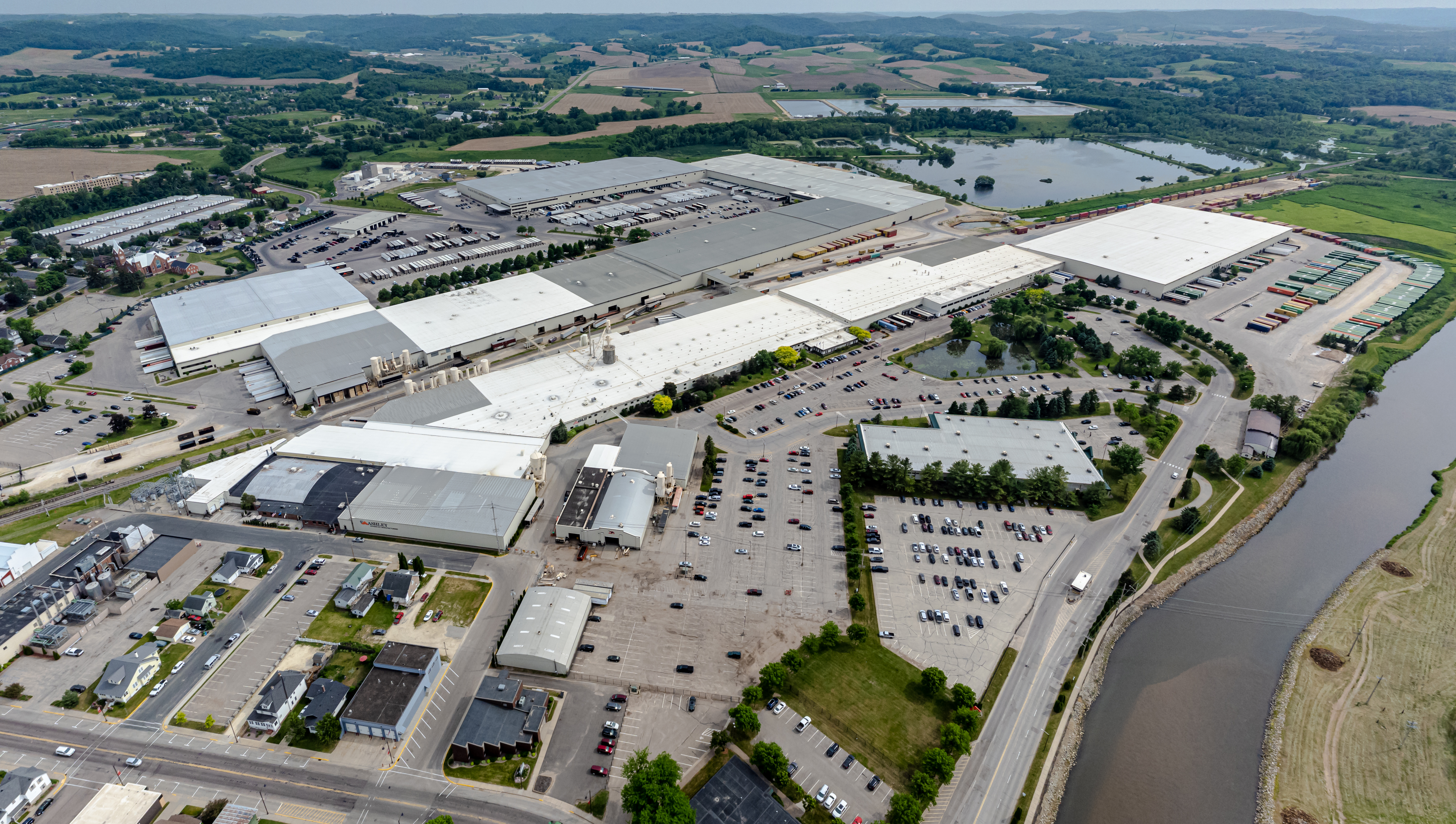
Ashley Furniture headquarters

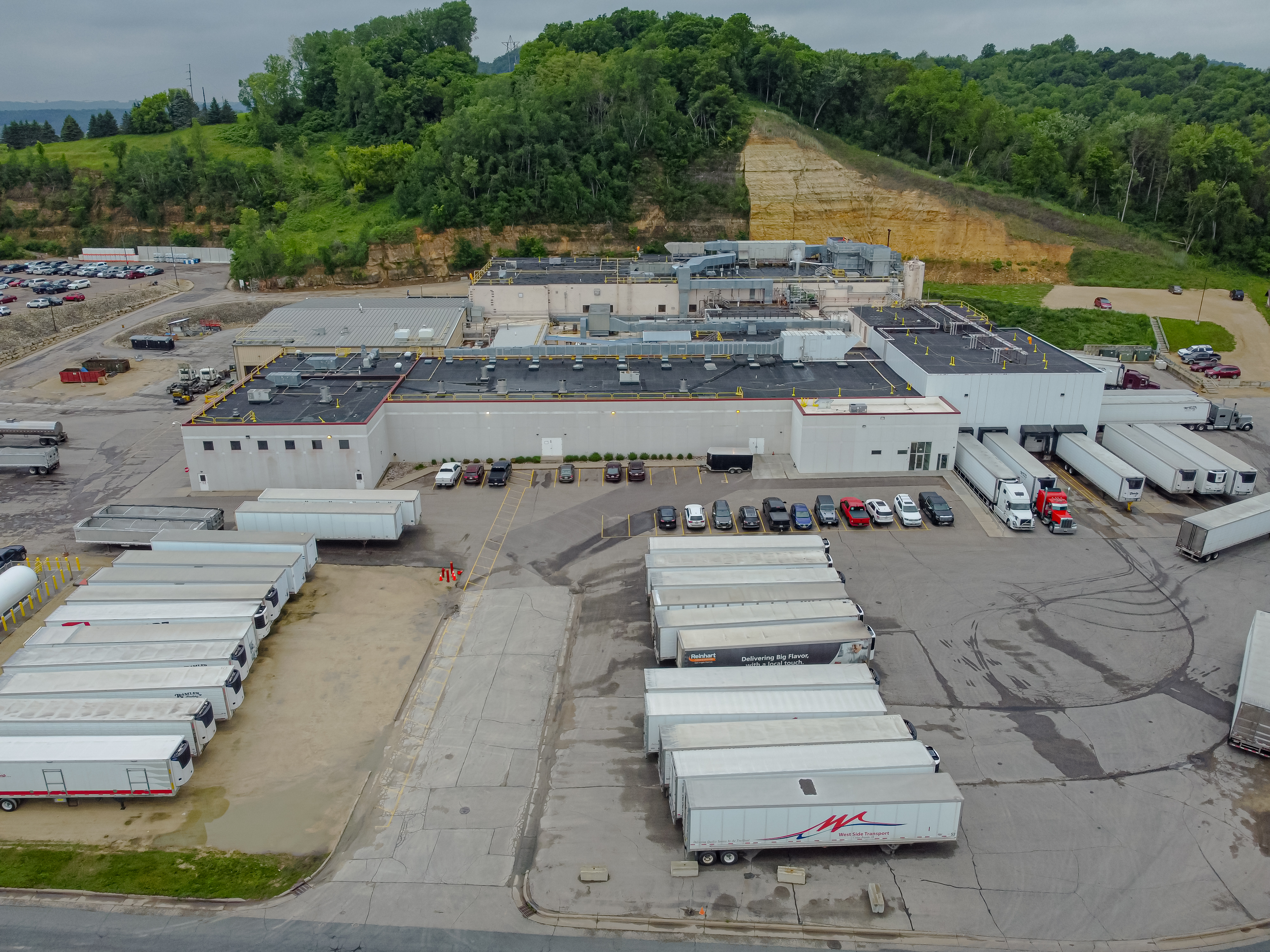
Gold'n Plump in Arcadia

Arcadia is the world headquarters of Ashley Furniture Industries, Inc. It is also the home of a poultry plant, formerly called Arcadia Fryers chicken processing corporation, bought in 1993 by Gold'n Plump Inc. In November 2016, Pilgrim's Pride bought Gold'n Plump Inc.

== Education ==
Public education is provided by the Arcadia School District. The District includes Arcadia Elementary School, Arcadia Middle School and Arcadia High School.

== Notable people ==
- Elmer E. Barlow, Wisconsin Supreme Court justice
- Will Berzinski, NFL player
- Robert Henry Brom, Roman Catholic Bishop Emeritus of the Diocese of San Diego
- Noah D. Comstock, farmer and politician
- Louise Erickson, baseball player
- John C. Gaveney, politician and jurist
- Chauncey E. Heath, mail carrier, soldier, farmer and politician
- David L. Holcomb, politician
- Ernest Micek, former CEO of Cargill

== Buildings and structures ==
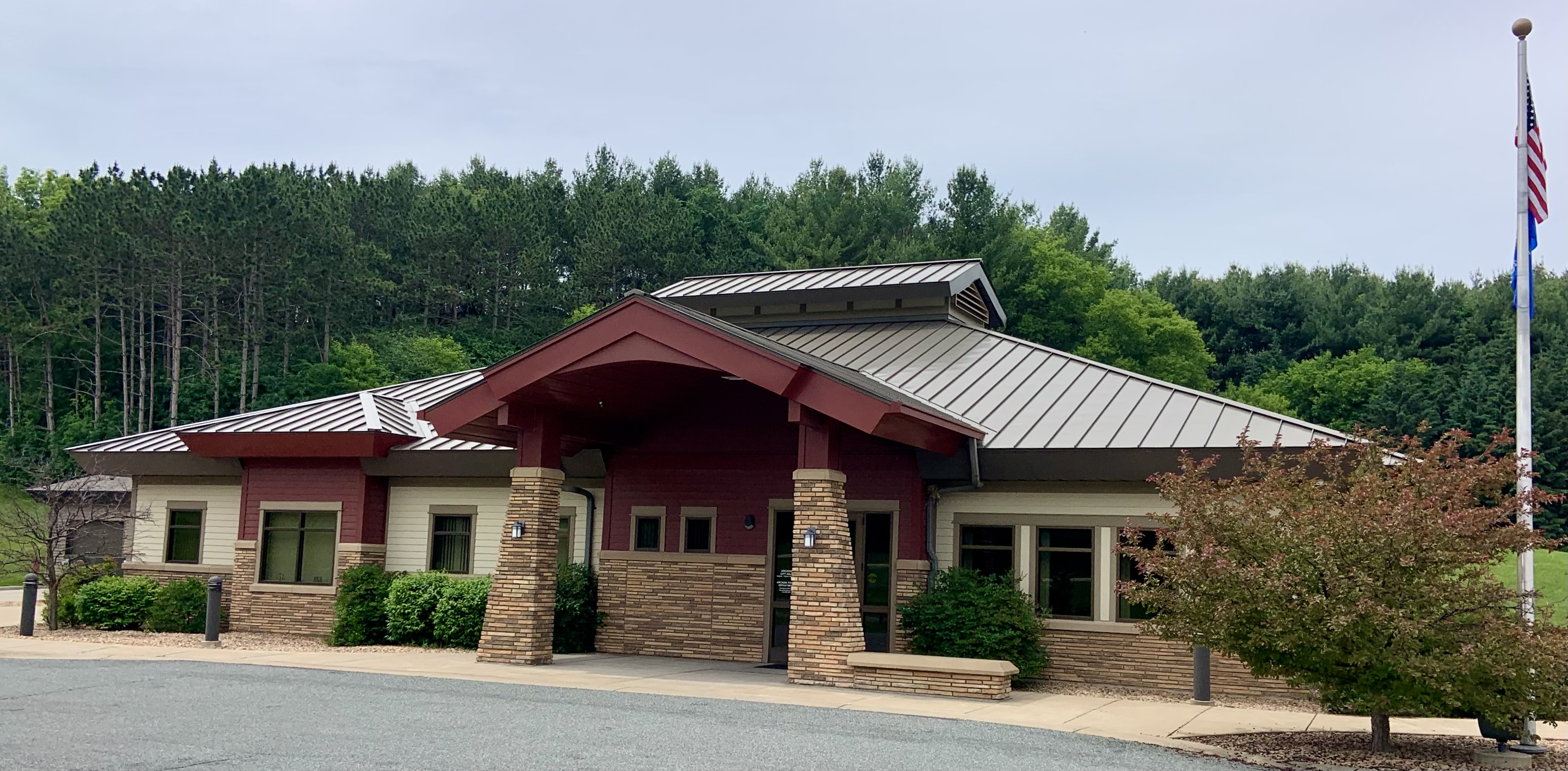
Arcadia City Hall

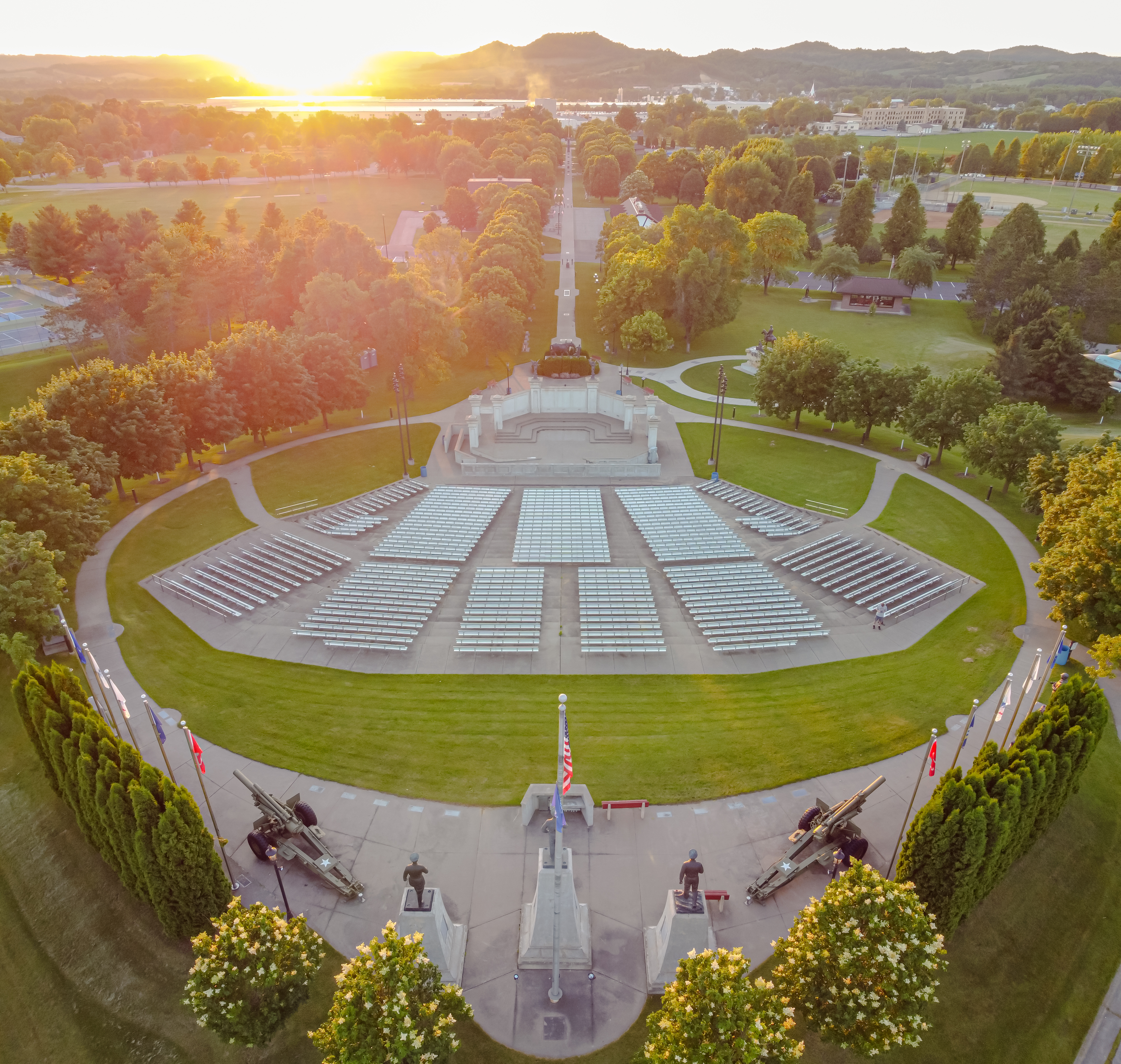
Soldiers Walk Memorial Park

- Arcadia Free Public Library
