= Norman County Courthouse =

- U.S. National Register of Historic Places
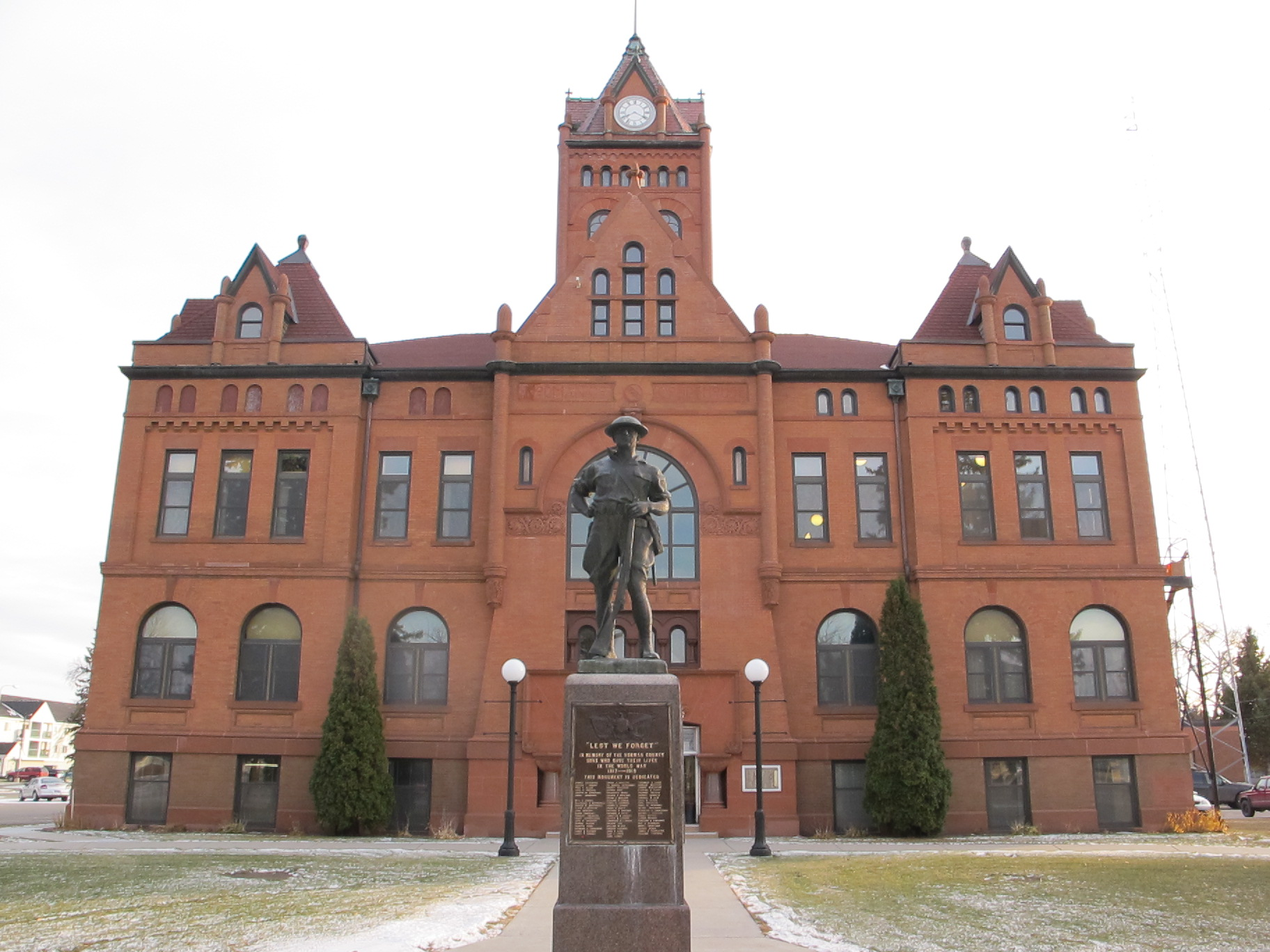
- Norman County Courthouse
- Location: 16 E.3rd Ave., Ada, Minnesota
- Coordinates: 47°17′55″N 96°30′46″W
- Area: less than one acre
- Built: 1904
- Architect: Omeyer & Thori
- Architectural style: Romanesque
- NRHP reference No.: 83000923
- Added to NRHP: May 9, 1983

The Norman County Courthouse is a historic courthouse in Ada, Minnesota. It is actually the second building in Ada used by the county government. In 1883 the first offices were in a two story building on the NE corner of the block the current courthouse sits on. The county rented the space from the village of Ada for $430/yr. After the new courthouse was built, the old building was moved three blocks north.

This kicked off a three year row with Twin Valley, Minnesota determining which town would be the county seat. As Norman County grew in the 1880s, they were outgrowing their current space being used as a county courthouse in Ada and erecting a new building was on the horizon. At the time, Norman County was bigger than today with Twin Valley roughly at the geographic center. Starting in 1900, Twin Valley worked to rally support behind the goal of building the new courthouse there, turning it into the county seat as well. Two petitions and one vote later, Ada won the challenge. In 1906 it became a moot point when Mahnomen County was formed, shrinking Norman County and making Ada the geographic center.

The new courthouse was designed in the Richardsonian Romanesque Revival style by Omeyer & Thori and completed in 1904. That firm and their partners have a number of their buildings in the Upper Midwest listed on the National Register of Historic Places. Coming all the way from St. Paul, Olaf Swenson was the contractor and the new building was built for $50,637.

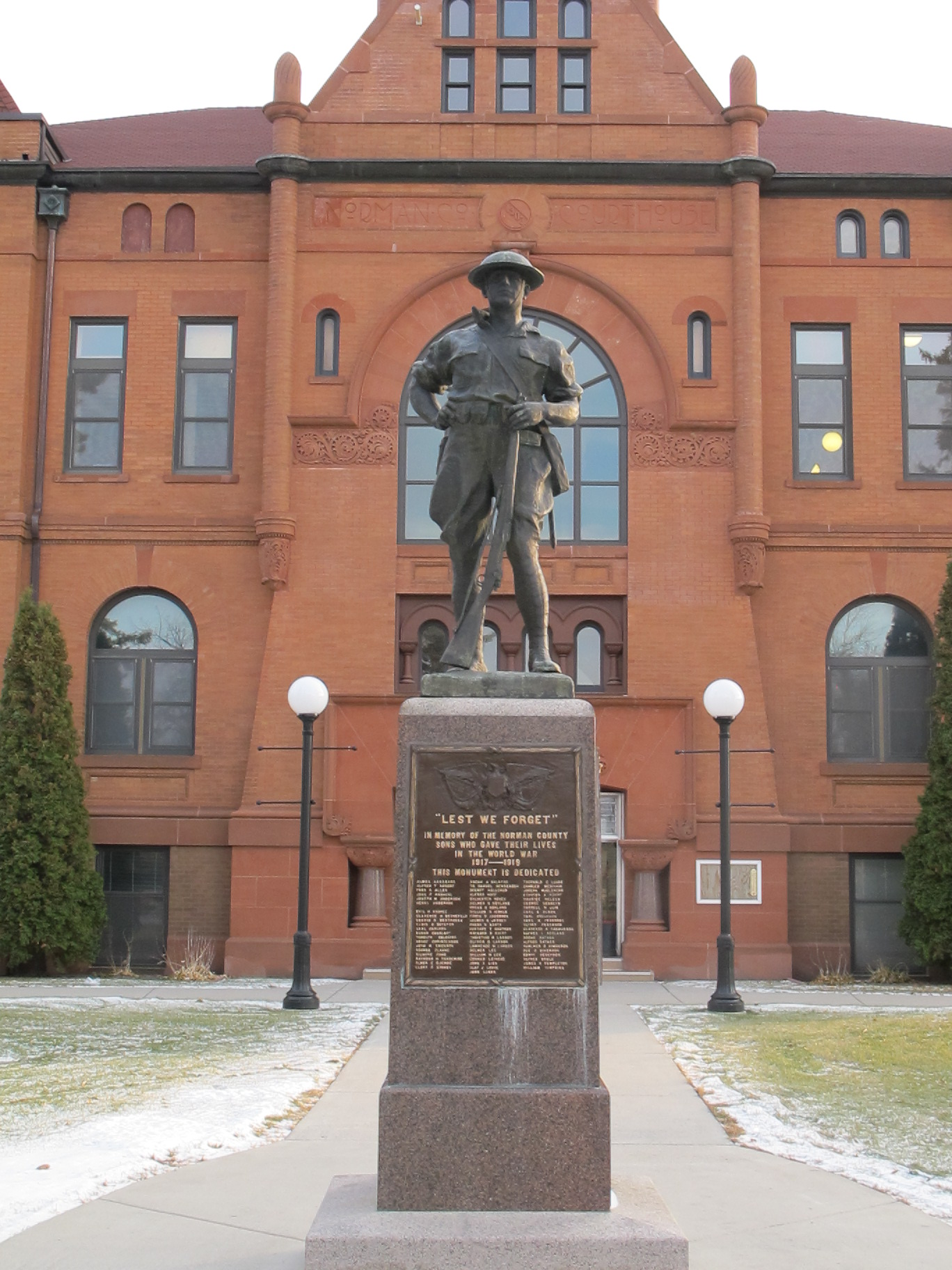
Norman County Courthouse Soldiers' Memorial

A Soldiers’ Memorial was erected and dedicated on Memorial Day 1926. The monument consists of a bronze statue of a World War I soldier standing on a granite base on which is fastened a bronze tablet with the words:

"Lest We Forget

In the Memory of the Norman County

sons who gave their lives

in the World War

1917-1919

This monument is dedicated"

Since its erection two more tablets have been installed, honoring those who gave their lives in World War II, and the wars in Korea and Vietnam.

In 1975 a 50’x80’ addition was built on the south side of the original 90’x90’ building.

The Norman County Courthouse was listed in the National Register of Historic Places in 1983.
