= Northwood, Iowa =

- City
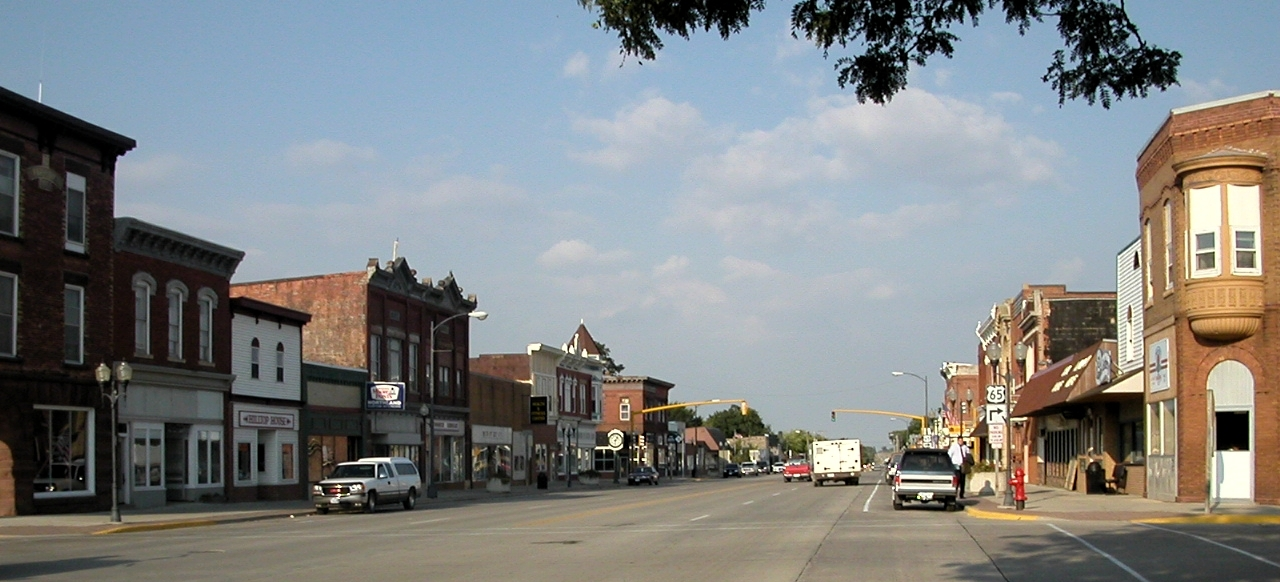
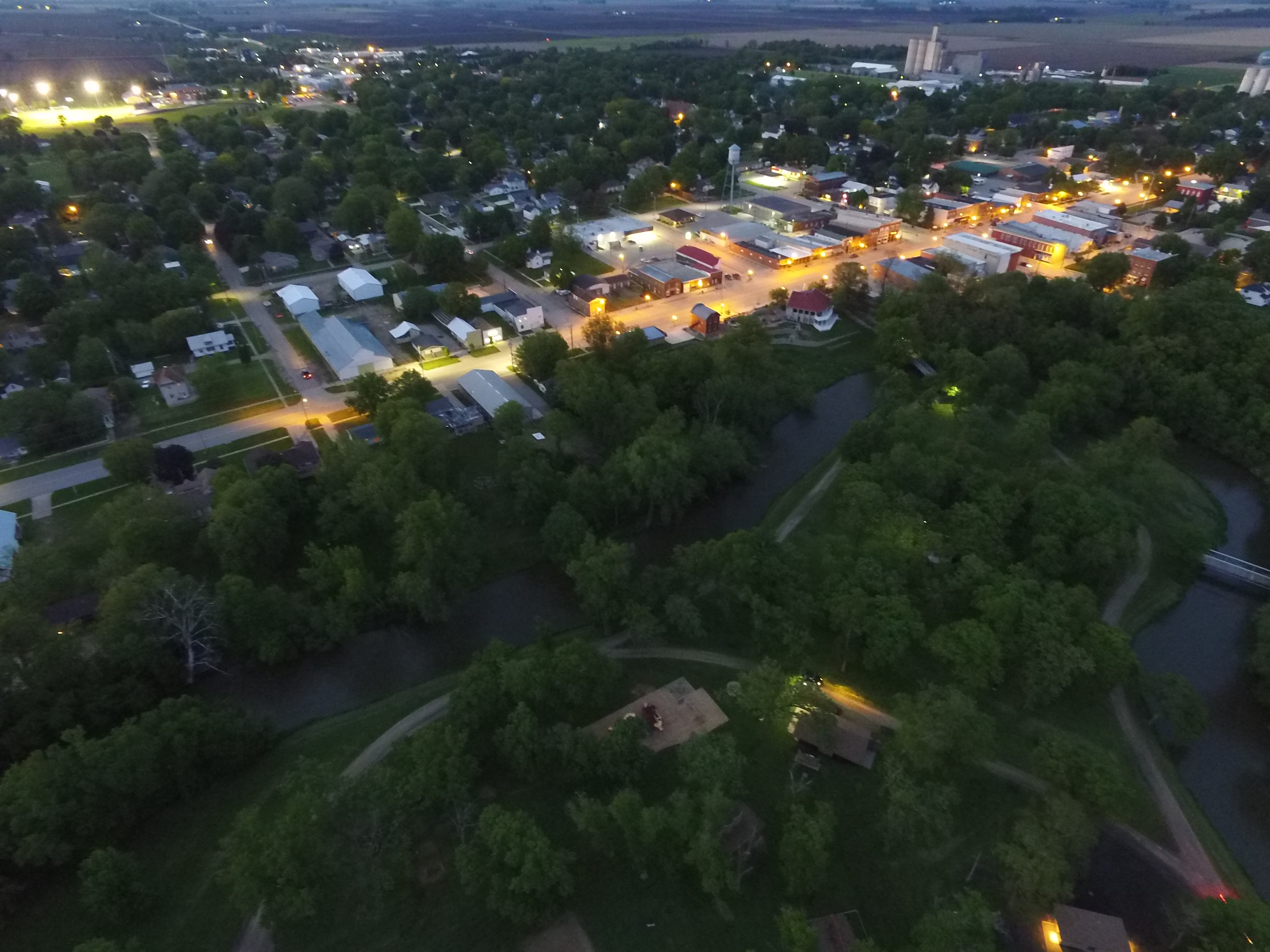
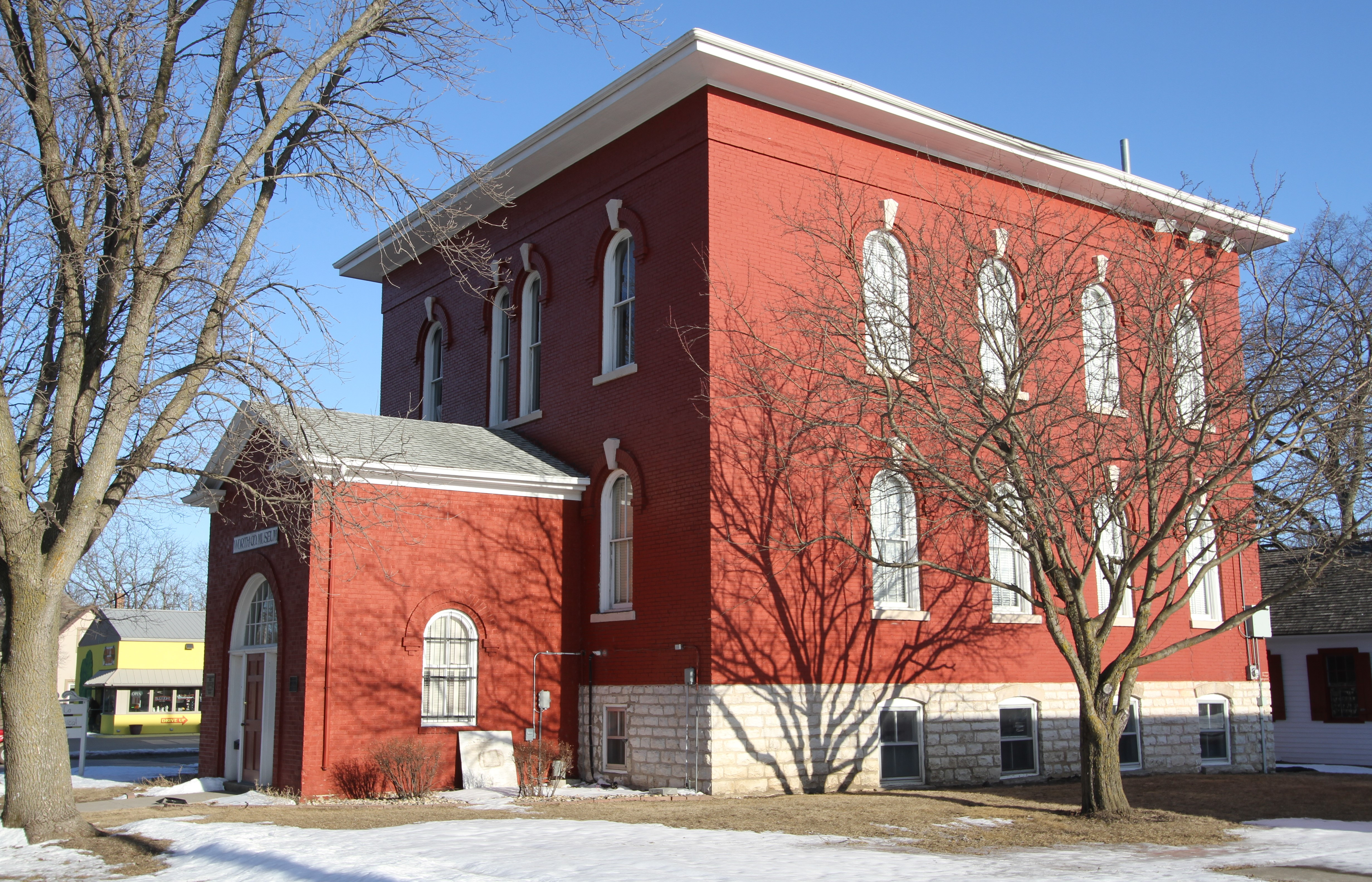
- Northwood Central Avenue Historic District Northwood Aerial View Worth County Historical Society

- Location of Northwood, Iowa
- Coordinates: 43°26′39″N 93°12′57″W
- Country: US
- State: Iowa
- County: Worth

Area
  - Total: 3.98 sq mi (10.32 km^{2})
  - Land: 3.98 sq mi (10.32 km^{2})
  - Water: 0 sq mi (0.00 km^{2})
- Elevation: 1,230 ft (370 m)

Population (2020)
  - Total: 2,072
  - Density: 519.9/sq mi (200.72/km^{2})
- Time zone: UTC-6 (Central (CST))
  - Summer (DST): UTC-5 (CDT)
- ZIP code: 50459
- Area code: 641
- FIPS code: 19-57630
- GNIS feature ID: 2395270
- Website: www.northwoodia.org

Northwood is a city in and the county seat of Worth County, Iowa, United States, along the Shell Rock River. The population was 2,072 at the time of the 2020 census.

Northwood is part of the Mason City Micropolitan Statistical Area.

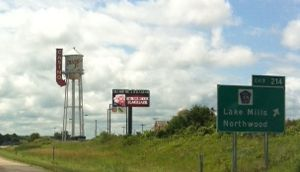
Diamond Jo's casino is in rural Northwood, on west side of I-35.

== History ==
Northwood was laid out in 1857 and platted in 1858.

== Geography ==
According to the United States Census Bureau, the city has a total area of 3.76 square miles (9.74 km^{2}), all land.

== Demographics ==
Northwood historical population
Year	Pop.	±%
1870	289	—
1880	844	+192.0%
1890	859	+1.8%
1900	1,271	+48.0%
1910	1,264	−0.6%
1920	1,597	+26.3%
1930	1,554	−2.7%
1940	1,724	+10.9%
1950	1,767	+2.5%
1960	1,768	+0.1%
1970	1,950	+10.3%
1980	2,193	+12.5%
1990	1,940	−11.5%
2000	2,050	+5.7%
2010	1,989	−3.0%
2020	2,072	+4.2%
Source: "U.S. Census website". United States Census Bureau. Source: U.S. Decennial Census

=== 2020 census ===
As of the 2020 census, there were 2,072 people, 915 households, and 535 families residing in the city. The population density was 519.9 inhabitants per square mile (200.7/km^{2}). The median age was 41.9 years. Of residents, 23.1% were under the age of 18, 24.4% were under the age of 20, 4.5% were between the ages of 20 and 24, 24.2% were from 25 to 44, 22.6% were from 45 to 64, and 24.3% were 65 years of age or older. For every 100 females there were 100.0 males, and for every 100 females age 18 and over there were 94.2 males.

0.0% of residents lived in urban areas, while 100.0% lived in rural areas.

Of households, 27.4% had children under the age of 18 living in them. Of all households, 45.4% were married-couple households, 7.2% were cohabitating couple households, 20.9% were households with a male householder and no spouse or partner present, and 26.6% were households with a female householder and no spouse or partner present. 41.5% of all households were non-families, 35.8% were made up of individuals, and 19.3% had someone living alone who was 65 years of age or older.

There were 990 housing units at an average density of 248.4 per square mile (95.9/km^{2}), of which 7.6% were vacant. The homeowner vacancy rate was 1.0% and the rental vacancy rate was 8.8%.

Racial composition as of the 2020 census
Race	Number	Percent
White	1,953	94.3%
Black or African American	25	1.2%
American Indian and Alaska Native	2	0.1%
Asian	7	0.3%
Native Hawaiian and Other Pacific Islander	1	0.0%
Some other race	7	0.3%
Two or more races	77	3.7%
Hispanic or Latino (of any race)	67	3.2%

=== 2010 census ===
As of the census of 2010, there were 1,989 people, 885 households, and 530 families living in the city. The population density was 529.0 inhabitants per square mile (204.2/km^{2}). There were 1,004 housing units at an average density of 267.0 per square mile (103.1/km^{2}). The racial makeup of the city was 97.3% White, 0.5% African American, 0.2% Native American, 0.1% Asian, 0.9% from other races, and 1.1% from two or more races. Hispanic or Latino of any race were 2.3% of the population.

There were 885 households, of which 25.3% had children under the age of 18 living with them, 47.5% were married couples living together, 9.3% had a female householder with no husband present, 3.2% had a male householder with no wife present, and 40.1% were non-families. 35.0% of all households were made up of individuals, and 17.1% had someone living alone who was 65 years of age or older. The average household size was 2.19 and the average family size was 2.80.

The median age in the city was 44.2 years. 21.8% of residents were under the age of 18; 6.7% were between the ages of 18 and 24; 22.4% were from 25 to 44; 27.2% were from 45 to 64; and 21.8% were 65 years of age or older. The gender makeup of the city was 48.1% male and 51.9% female.

=== 2000 census ===
As of the census of 2000, there were 2,050 people, 914 households, and 549 families living in the city. The population density was 542.2 inhabitants per square mile (209.3/km^{2}). There were 982 housing units at an average density of 259.7 per square mile (100.3/km^{2}). The racial makeup of the city was 98.24% White, 0.10% African American, 0.10% Native American, 0.20% Asian, 0.44% from other races, and 0.93% from two or more races. Hispanic or Latino of any race were 2.39% of the population.

There were 914 households, out of which 25.8% had children under the age of 18 living with them, 47.9% were married couples living together, 8.9% had a female householder with no husband present, and 39.9% were non-families. 36.0% of all households were made up of individuals, and 20.6% had someone living alone who was 65 years of age or older. The average household size was 2.15 and the average family size was 2.76.

20.5% are under the age of 18, 7.2% from 18 to 24, 23.9% from 25 to 44, 22.4% from 45 to 64, and 26.0% who were 65 years of age or older. The median age was 44 years. For every 100 females, there were 89.5 males. For every 100 females age 18 and over, there were 84.8 males.

The median income for a household in the city was $33,030, and the median income for a family was $41,445. Males had a median income of $27,589 versus $20,637 for females. The per capita income for the city was $18,167. About 6.4% of families and 7.9% of the population were below the poverty line, including 5.8% of those under age 18 and 11.6% of those age 65 or over.

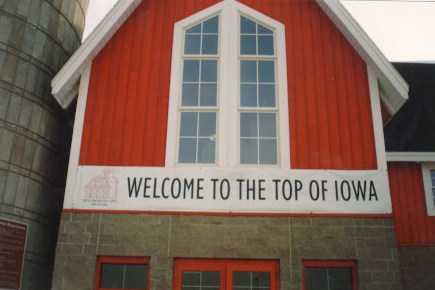
"Top of Iowa" Visitor center, located in Northwood

== Education ==
The Northwood-Kensett Community School District operates local area public schools.

== Climate ==
Humid continental climate is a climatic designation typified by large seasonal temperature differences, with warm to hot (and often humid) summers and cold (sometimes severely cold) winters. The Köppen Climate Classification subtype for this climate is "Dfb" (Hot Summer Continental Climate).

Climate data for Northwood, Iowa (1991–2020 normals, extremes 1896–present)
Month	Jan	Feb	Mar	Apr	May	Jun	Jul	Aug	Sep	Oct	Nov	Dec	Year
Record high °F (°C)	63 (17)	65 (18)	83 (28)	93 (34)	105 (41)	103 (39)	107 (42)	103 (39)	98 (37)	93 (34)	79 (26)	66 (19)	107 (42)
Mean daily maximum °F (°C)	21.3 (−5.9)	25.7 (−3.5)	38.4 (3.6)	54.0 (12.2)	66.3 (19.1)	76.0 (24.4)	78.6 (25.9)	76.4 (24.7)	70.8 (21.6)	57.1 (13.9)	40.8 (4.9)	27.4 (−2.6)	52.7 (11.5)
Daily mean °F (°C)	12.6 (−10.8)	16.9 (−8.4)	29.5 (−1.4)	43.3 (6.3)	55.6 (13.1)	65.9 (18.8)	69.0 (20.6)	66.5 (19.2)	59.3 (15.2)	46.1 (7.8)	31.7 (−0.2)	19.4 (−7.0)	43.0 (6.1)
Mean daily minimum °F (°C)	3.8 (−15.7)	8.0 (−13.3)	20.6 (−6.3)	32.6 (0.3)	44.9 (7.2)	55.9 (13.3)	59.4 (15.2)	56.6 (13.7)	47.9 (8.8)	35.1 (1.7)	22.6 (−5.2)	11.4 (−11.4)	33.2 (0.7)
Record low °F (°C)	−37 (−38)	−34 (−37)	−27 (−33)	4 (−16)	20 (−7)	32 (0)	38 (3)	35 (2)	20 (−7)	−2 (−19)	−16 (−27)	−27 (−33)	−37 (−38)
Average precipitation inches (mm)	1.07 (27)	1.02 (26)	1.99 (51)	3.82 (97)	4.78 (121)	5.13 (130)	4.73 (120)	3.92 (100)	3.32 (84)	2.68 (68)	1.73 (44)	1.28 (33)	35.47 (901)
Average snowfall inches (cm)	10.9 (28)	9.3 (24)	6.2 (16)	3.3 (8.4)	0.0 (0.0)	0.0 (0.0)	0.0 (0.0)	0.0 (0.0)	0.0 (0.0)	0.3 (0.76)	2.6 (6.6)	7.6 (19)	40.2 (102)
Average precipitation days (≥ 0.01 in)	7.8	6.0	7.6	10.0	12.0	11.1	8.6	8.4	7.8	8.1	6.8	6.9	101.1
Average snowy days (≥ 0.1 in)	6.2	4.9	3.4	1.0	0.0	0.0	0.0	0.0	0.0	0.2	2.3	5.4	23.4
Source: NOAA
