= Northern England =

Cultural area of England

- The three Northern England statistical regions combined shown within England. Other definitions of the North vary and have changed over time.
- Coordinates: 54°N 2°W
- Sovereign state: United Kingdom
- Country: England
- Subdivisions: 3 regions: North East; North West; Yorkshire and the Humber; 7 combined authorities: Greater Manchester; Liverpool City Region; North East; South Yorkshire; Tees Valley; West Yorkshire; York and North Yorkshire; 13 counties: Cheshire; Cumbria; County Durham; East Riding of Yorkshire; Greater Manchester; Lancashire; Lincolnshire (part); Merseyside; North Yorkshire; Northumberland; Tyne and Wear; South Yorkshire; West Yorkshire

Area
  - Land: 14,708 sq mi (38,093 km^{2})

Population (2025)
  - Total: 16,207,766
  - Density: 1,100/sq mi (425/km^{2})
- Demonym: Northerner
- Time zone: UTC+0 (GMT)
  - Summer (DST): UTC+1 (BST)

Northern England, or the North of England, often referred to as simply the North, is the northern part of England and mainly corresponds to the historic counties of Cheshire, Cumberland, Durham, Lancashire, Northumberland, Westmorland and Yorkshire. Officially, it is a grouping of three statistical regions: the North East, the North West, and Yorkshire and the Humber, which had a combined population of 15.5 million at the 2021 census, an area of 37,331 km^{2} (14,414 square miles) and 18 cities.

Northern England is culturally and economically distinct from both the Midlands and Southern England. The area's northern boundary is the border with Scotland, its western the Irish Sea and a short border with Wales, and its eastern the North Sea. Its southern border is often debated, and there has been controversy in defining what geographies or cultures precisely constitute the 'North of England'.

The region corresponds to the borders of the sub-Roman Brythonic Celtic territory of the Old North (Yr Hen Ogledd), as well as the medieval Anglian Kingdom of Northumbria. Many Industrial Revolution innovations began in Northern England, and its cities were the crucibles of many of the political changes that accompanied this social upheaval, from trade unionism to Manchester Liberalism. In the late 19th and early 20th centuries, the economy of the North was dominated by heavy industry. Centuries of immigration, invasion, and labour have shaped Northern England's culture, and it has retained countless distinctive accents and dialects, music, arts, and cuisine. Industrial decline in the second half of the 20th century damaged the North, leading to greater deprivation than in the South. Although urban renewal projects and the transition to a service economy have resulted in strong economic growth in parts of the North, the North–South divide remains in both the economy and culture of England.

== Definitions ==
For government and statistical purposes, Northern England is defined as the area covered by the three northernmost statistical regions of England: North East England, North West England and Yorkshire and the Humber. This area consists of the ceremonial counties of Cheshire, Cumbria, County Durham, East Riding of Yorkshire, Greater Manchester, Lancashire, Merseyside, Northumberland, North Yorkshire, South Yorkshire, Tyne and Wear and West Yorkshire, plus the unitary authority areas of North Lincolnshire and North East Lincolnshire within the ceremonial county Lincolnshire.

Northern England (red) as defined along historic county boundaries against the rest of England. Cheshire (purple) is also often included.

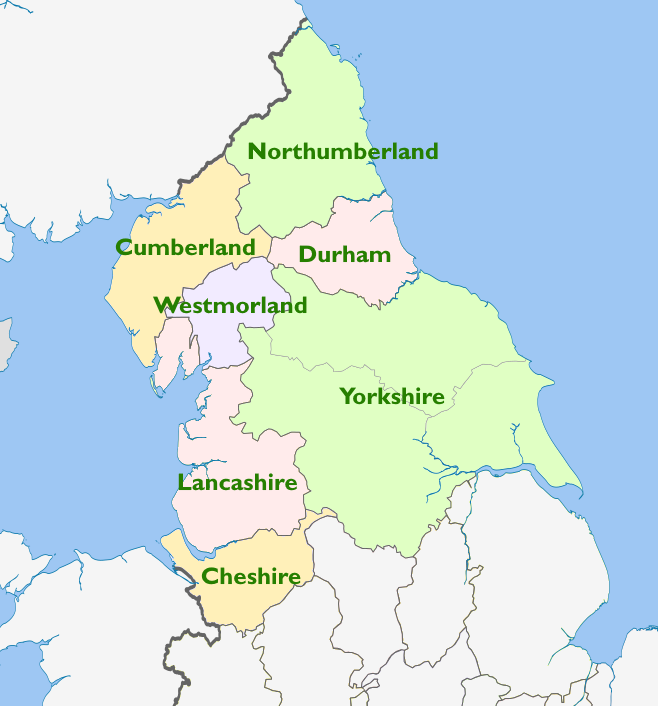
Close-up labelled map of Northern England and its traditional counties

Other definitions use historic county boundaries, in which case the North is generally taken to comprise Cumberland, Northumberland, Westmorland, County Durham, Lancashire and Yorkshire, often supplemented by Cheshire. The boundary is sometimes drawn without reference to human borders, using geographic features such as the River Mersey (the line between the Humber and Mersey estuaries being a common boundary) and River Trent. The Isle of Man is occasionally included in broad geographical definitions of "the North" (for example, by the Survey of English Dialects, VisitBritain and BBC North West), although it is politically and culturally distinct from England.

Some areas of Derbyshire, Lincolnshire, Nottinghamshire and Staffordshire have northern characteristics and include satellites of northern cities. Towns in the High Peak borough of Derbyshire are included in the Greater Manchester Built-Up Area, as villages and hamlets there such as Tintwistle, Crowden and Woodhead were formerly in Cheshire before local government boundary changes in 1974, due to their close proximity to the city of Manchester, and before this the borough was considered to be part of the Greater Manchester Statutory City Region. More recently, the Chesterfield, North East Derbyshire, Bolsover, and Derbyshire Dales districts have joined with districts of South Yorkshire to form the Sheffield City Region, along with the Bassetlaw District of Nottinghamshire, although for all other purposes these districts still remain in their respective East Midlands counties. Some parts of northern Derbyshire (including High Peak), Shropshire and Staffordshire are served by BBC North West. Some areas of Derbyshire and Nottinghamshire are served by BBC Yorkshire (formerly BBC North), whilst eastern Yorkshire shares its BBC region with Lincolnshire and small parts of Nottinghamshire and north west Norfolk. The historic part of Lincolnshire known as Lindsey (in essence the northern half of the county) is considered by many to be northern, or at least a larger part of Lincolnshire than merely the north and northeast Lincolnshire districts. The geographer Danny Dorling includes most of the West Midlands and part of the East Midlands in his definition of the North, claiming that "ideas of a midlands region add more confusion than light".

Conversely, more restrictive definitions of Northern England also exist. Some are based on the extent of the historical Northumbria, which excludes Cheshire and northern Lincolnshire, though the latter formed the Kingdom of Lindsey, which was periodically under Northumbrian rule. The Redcliffe-Maud Report (1969) proposed that southern Cheshire be grouped with north Staffordshire as part of a West Midlands province as opposed to a North West England one. Occasionally, "Northern England" may be used to describe England's northernmost reaches only, broadly the North East and Cumbria, excluding the entirety, or at least the majority, of Lancashire and Yorkshire. Some settlements, including Sheffield, located in the far south of what would typically be defined as "the North", have been referred to as being in the "North Midlands" as opposed to "the North".

Various "gateways" to the North

Personal definitions of the North vary greatly. When asked to draw a dividing line between North and South, Southerners tend to draw this line further south than Northerners do. From the Southern perspective, Northern England is sometimes defined jokingly as the area north of the Watford Gap between Northampton and Leicester (Note: Not to be confused with the town of Watford on the northern edge of London, which is used to define the North only in London-centric jokes.) – a definition which would include much of the Midlands. Various cities and towns have been described as or promoted themselves as the "gateway to the North", including Crewe, Stoke-on-Trent, and Sheffield. For some in the northernmost reaches of England, the North starts somewhere in North Yorkshire around the River Tees – the Yorkshire poet Simon Armitage suggests Thirsk, Northallerton or Richmond – and does not include cities like Manchester and Leeds, nor the majority of Yorkshire. Northern England is not a homogeneous unit, and some have entirely rejected the idea that the North exists as a coherent entity, claiming that considerable cultural differences across the area overwhelm any similarities.

== Geography and cities ==
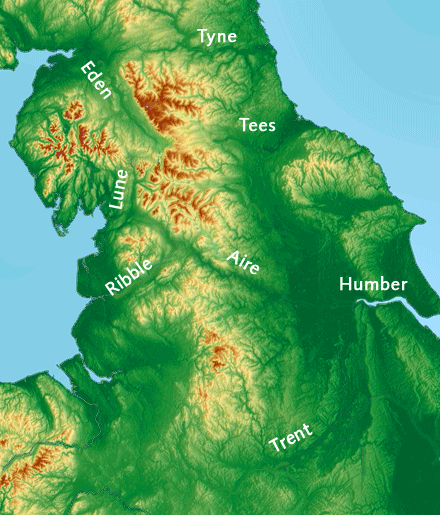
Relief map of Northern England, showing the Pennines and river valleys

The Pennines, an upland range sometimes referred to as "the backbone of England" run through most of the area defined as northern England, which stretches from the Tyne Gap to the Peak District. Other uplands in the North include the Lake District with England's highest mountains, the Cheviot Hills adjoining the border with Scotland, and the North York Moors near the North Sea coastline.

The geography of the North has been heavily shaped by the ice sheets of the Pleistocene era, which often reached as far south as the Midlands. Glaciers carved deep, craggy valleys in the central uplands, and, when they melted, deposited large quantities of fluvio-glacial material in lowland areas like the Cheshire and Solway Plains. On the eastern side of the Pennines, a former glacial lake forms the Humberhead Levels: a large area of fenland which drains into the Humber and which is very fertile and productive farmland.

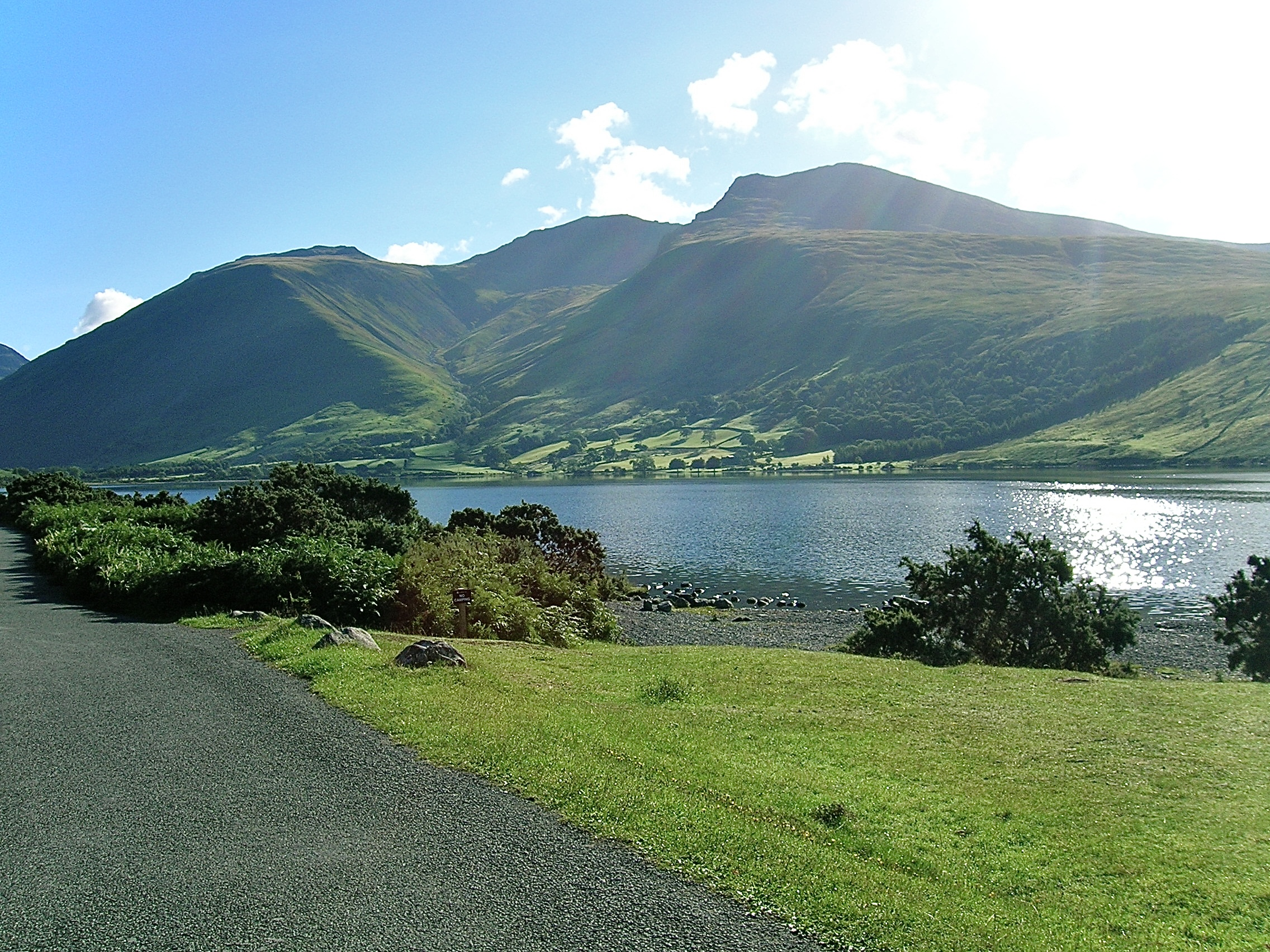
Scafell Pike, England's highest peak, alongside Wastwater, its deepest lake

Much of the mountainous upland remains undeveloped, and of the ten national parks in England, five – the Peak District, the Lake District, the North York Moors, the Yorkshire Dales, and Northumberland National Park – are located partly or entirely in the North. (Note: Part of the Peak District is located in the Midlands statistical regions.) The Lake District includes England's highest peak, Scafell Pike, which rises to 978 m (3,209 ft), its largest lake, Windermere, and its deepest lake, Wastwater. Northern England is one of the most treeless areas in Europe, and to combat this the government plans to plant over 50 million trees in a new Northern Forest.

=== Urban ===
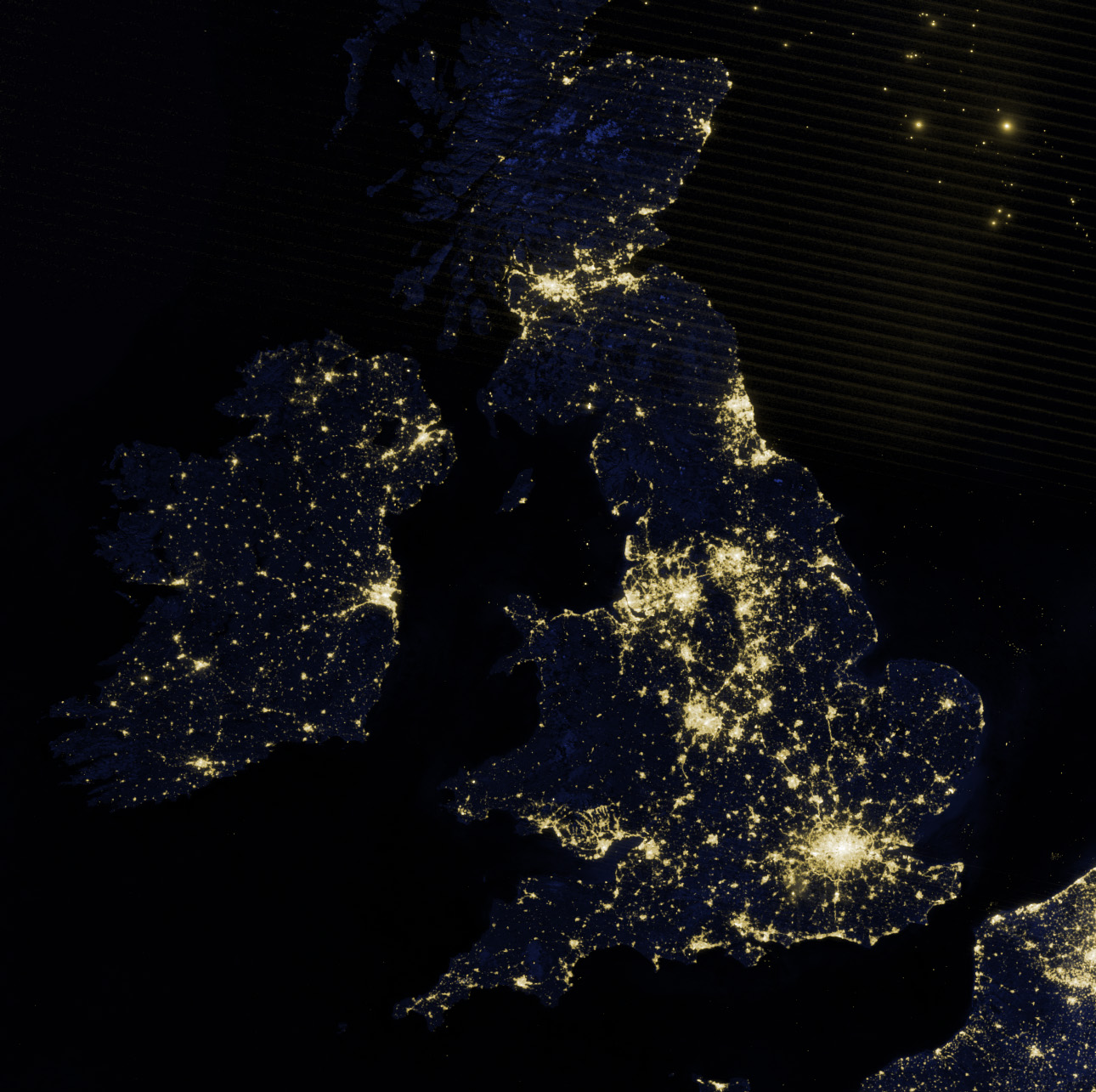
Urban sprawl in the southern Pennines and north east coast is clearly visible in night-time imagery.

Uniquely for such a large urban belt in Europe, the major cities in this region are all as recent as the Industrial Revolution; its more historic cities such as Chester, Durham, Lancaster and York are now relatively small and insignificant economically. Vast urban areas have emerged along the coasts and rivers, and they run almost contiguously into each other in places. Near the east coast, trade fuelled the growth of major ports and settlements (Kingston upon Hull, Newcastle upon Tyne, (Note: Named "Hull" and "Newcastle" respectively throughout the rest of this article) Middlesbrough and Sunderland) to create multiple urban areas. Inland needs of trade and industry produced an almost continuous urbanisation from the Wirral Peninsula to Doncaster, taking in the cities of Liverpool, Manchester, Leeds, and Sheffield, with a population of at least 7.6 million.

Analysis by The Northern Way in 2006 found that 90% of the population of the North lived in and around: Liverpool, Central Lancashire, Manchester, Sheffield, Leeds, Hull and Humber Ports, Tees Valley and Tyne and Wear. At the 2011 census, 86% of the Northern population lived in urban areas as defined by the Office for National Statistics, compared to 82% for England as a whole.

Largest cities and towns in Northern England 2021 Census
Rank		Counties	Pop.	Rank		Counties	Pop.
1	Leeds	West Yorkshire	536,280	11	Blackpool	Lancashire	149,070
2	Liverpool	Merseyside	506,565	12	Middlesbrough	North Yorkshire	148,215
3	Sheffield	South Yorkshire	500,535	13	York	North Yorkshire	141,685
4	Manchester	Greater Manchester	470,405	14	Huddersfield	West Yorkshire	141,675
5	Bradford	West Yorkshire	333,950	15	Blackburn	Lancashire	124,955
6	Newcastle-upon-Tyne	Tyne and Wear	286,445	16	Stockport	Greater Manchester	117,935
7	Kingston upon Hull	East Riding of Yorkshire	270,810	17	Gateshead	Tyne and Wear	115,280
8	Bolton	Greater Manchester	184,090	18	Rochdale	Greater Manchester	111,255
9	Warrington	Cheshire	174,970	19	Oldham	Greater Manchester	110,720
10	Sunderland	Tyne and Wear	168,315	20	Salford	Greater Manchester	108,410

Due to differing definitions and city limits, the list of largest towns and cities may be misleading. For example while Manchester is ranked fourth as a city, the greater urban area it leads (Greater Manchester Built-up Area) is the largest in the region and larger than Leeds's urban area (West Yorkshire Built-up Area) despite Leeds being the largest as a sole city. The table below shows the urban areas in the region with a population of at least 250,000.

Largest urban areas in Northern England (2011 census)
Rank	Area	Population	Area (km^{2})	Density (People/km^{2})	Primary settlements
1	Greater Manchester	2,553,379	630.3	4,051	Manchester, Bolton, Rochdale, Stockport, Salford, Oldham, Bury, Atherton (Leigh), Altrincham, Stretford, Sale, Ashton-under-Lyne, Middleton, Urmston, Eccles, Denton, Glossop, Golborne, Newton-le-Willows
2	West Yorkshire	1,777,934	487.8	3,645	Leeds, Bradford, Huddersfield, Wakefield, Halifax, Dewsbury, Keighley, Batley, Brighouse, Pudsey, Morley, Shipley
3	Liverpool	864,122	199.6	4,329	Liverpool, St. Helens, Bootle, Crosby, Prescot, Ashton-in-Makerfield, Litherland
4	Tyneside	774,891	180.5	4,292	Newcastle upon Tyne, Gateshead, South Shields, Tynemouth, Wallsend, Jarrow
5	Sheffield	685,368	167.5	4,092	Sheffield, Rotherham, Rawmarsh, Swallownest, Eckington, Killamarsh
6	Teesside	376,633	108.2	3,482	Middlesbrough, Stockton-on-Tees, Billingham, Redcar
7	Sunderland	335,415	137.5	4,018	Sunderland, Washington, Chester-le-Street, Hetton-le-Hole, Houghton-le-Spring
8	Kingston upon Hull	314,018	82.6	3,802	Kingston upon Hull, Cottingham, Hessle, Willerby
9	Preston	313,322	82.4	3,802	Preston, Chorley, Leyland, Fulwood, Bamber Bridge

=== Natural resources ===
Peat is found in thick, plentiful layers across the Pennines and Scottish Borders, and there are many large coalfields, including the Great Northern, Lancashire and South Yorkshire Coalfields. Millstone grit, a distinctive coarse-grained rock used to make millstones, is widespread in the Pennines, and the variety of other rock types is reflected in the architecture of the region, such as the bright red sandstone seen in buildings in Chester, the cream-buff Yorkstone and the distinctive purple Doddington sandstone. These sandstones also mean that apart from the east coast, most of Northern England has very soft water, and this has influenced not just industry, but even the blends of tea enjoyed in the region.

Rich deposits of iron ore are found in Cumbria and the North East, and fluorspar and baryte are also plentiful in northern parts of the Pennines. Salt mining in Cheshire has a long history, and both remaining rock salt mines in Great Britain are in the North: Winsford Mine in Cheshire and Boulby Mine in North Yorkshire, which also produces half of the UK's potash.

=== Climate ===
Northern England has a cool, wet oceanic climate with small areas of subpolar oceanic climate in the uplands. Averaged across the entire region, (Note: The Met Office climate region "England N" is defined as the whole of England north of the 53°N parallel, approximately from Stoke-on-Trent to the Wash, and also includes the Isle of Man.) Northern England temperature range and sunshine duration is similar to the UK average and it sees substantially less rainfall than Scotland or Wales. It is cooler, wetter and cloudier than England as a whole, containing both England's coldest (Cross Fell) and rainiest point (Seathwaite Fell). These averages disguise considerable variation across the region, due chiefly to the upland regions and adjacent seas.

The prevailing winds across the British Isles are westerlies bringing moisture from the Atlantic; this means that the west coast frequently receives strong winds and heavy rainfall while the east coast lies in a rain shadow behind the Pennines. As a result, the coastal area north of the Humber is one the driest parts of England: the Tees basin on the east coast has 600 mm (24 in) of rain per year while parts of the Lake District on the west coast receive over 3,200 mm (130 in). Lowland regions in the more southern parts of Northern England (such as Cheshire and South Yorkshire) are the warmest with average maximum July temperatures of over 21 °C (70 °F): the highest points in the Pennines and Lake District reach only 17 °C (63 °F). The North has a reputation for cloud and fog, with less sunshine than Southern England, and the east coast experiences a distinctive fog called sea fret. Smog in urban areas was prevalent from the beginning of the Industrial Revolution, but sunshine duration has increased in urban areas in recent years with the Clean Air Act 1956 and decline of heavy industry.

Climate data for the England N climate region, 1981–2010
Month	Jan	Feb	Mar	Apr	May	Jun	Jul	Aug	Sep	Oct	Nov	Dec	Year
Mean daily maximum °C (°F)	6.4 (43.5)	6.6 (43.9)	8.8 (47.8)	11.4 (52.5)	14.7 (58.5)	17.3 (63.1)	19.4 (66.9)	19.1 (66.4)	16.5 (61.7)	12.8 (55.0)	9.1 (48.4)	6.7 (44.1)	12.4 (54.3)
Mean daily minimum °C (°F)	0.7 (33.3)	0.6 (33.1)	2.1 (35.8)	3.4 (38.1)	6.0 (42.8)	8.9 (48.0)	11.0 (51.8)	10.9 (51.6)	8.9 (48.0)	6.2 (43.2)	3.2 (37.8)	0.9 (33.6)	5.3 (41.5)
Average precipitation mm (inches)	94.1 (3.70)	69.2 (2.72)	75.2 (2.96)	64.9 (2.56)	61.0 (2.40)	71.9 (2.83)	72.3 (2.85)	82.4 (3.24)	80.8 (3.18)	100.6 (3.96)	98.1 (3.86)	99.2 (3.91)	969.8 (38.18)
Average precipitation days (≥ 1 mm)	14.2	11.1	12.5	10.9	10.5	10.7	10.7	11.5	10.9	13.6	14.3	13.7	144.5
Mean monthly sunshine hours	49.4	70.5	101.9	142.4	182.8	166.7	175.6	164.0	126.7	94.0	58.7	43.5	1,376.2
Source: Met Office

== Language and dialect ==
=== English ===
==== Dialect ====
The vowel sound in sun across England. All of Northern England, as well as part of the Midlands, is included inside the /ʊ/ isogloss.

The English spoken today in the North has been shaped by the area's history, and some dialects retain features inherited from Old Norse and the local Celtic languages. They are a dialectal continuum, middle areas that have a crossover between varieties spoken, around the North. Traditional dialectal areas are defined by their historic county or combined historic counties; including Cumbrian (Cumberland and Westmorland), Lancastrian (Lancashire), Northumbrian (Northumberland and Durham) and Tyke (Yorkshire). During the Industrial Revolution urban areas gained some or further distinction from traditional dialects; such as areas Mackem (Wearside), Mancunian (Manchester), Pitmatic (Great Northern Coalfield), Geordie (Tyneside), Smoggie (Teesside), Scouse (Liverpool) and around Hull.

Linguists have attempted to define a Northern dialect area, some correspond the area north of a line that begins at the Humber estuary and runs up the River Wharfe and across to the River Lune in north Lancashire. This area corresponds roughly to the sprachraum of the Old English Northumbrian dialect, although the linguistic elements that defined this area in the past, such as the use of doon instead of down and substitution of an ang sound in words that end -ong (lang instead of long), are now prevalent only in the more northern parts of the region. As speech has changed, there is little consensus on what defines a "Northern" accent or dialect.

Northern English accents have not undergone the TRAP–BATH split, and a common shibboleth to distinguish them from Southern ones is the Northern use of the short a (the near-open front unrounded vowel) in words such as bath and castle. On the opposite border, most Northern English accents can be distinguished from Scottish accents because they are non-rhotic, although some Lancashire and Northumberland accents remain rhotic. Other features common to many Northern English accents are the absence of the FOOT–STRUT split (so put and putt are homophones), the reduction of the definite article the to a glottal stop (usually represented in writing as t' or occasionally th', although it is often not pronounced as a /t/ sound) or its total elision, and the T-to-R rule that leads to the pronunciation of t as a rhotic consonant in phrases like get up ([ɡɛɹ ʊp]).

The pronouns thou and thee survive in some Northern English dialects, although these are dying out outside very rural areas, and many dialects have an informal second-person plural pronoun: either ye (common in the North East) or yous (common in areas with historical Irish communities). Many dialects use me as a possessive ("me car") and some treat us likewise ("us cars") or use the alternative wor ("wor cars"). Possessive pronouns are also used to mark the names of relatives in speech (for example, a relative called Joan would be referred to as "our Joan" in conversation).

With urbanisation, distinctive urban accents have arisen which often differ greatly from the historical accents of the surrounding rural areas and sometimes share features with Southern English accents. Northern English dialects remain an important part of the culture of the region, and the desire of speakers to assert their local identity has led to accents such as Scouse and Geordie becoming more distinctive and spreading into surrounding areas.

==== Literature ====
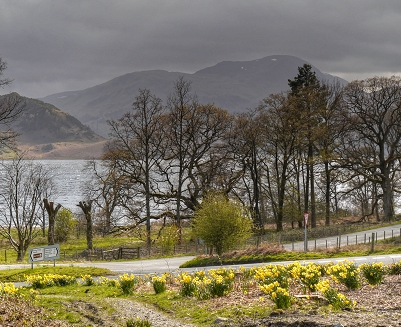
The daffodils of the Lake District are immortalised in Wordsworth's "I Wandered Lonely as a Cloud".

The contrasting geography of Northern England is reflected in its literature. On the one hand, the wild moors and lakes have inspired generations of Romantic authors: the poetry of William Wordsworth and the novels of the Brontë sisters are perhaps the most famous examples of writing inspired by these elemental forces. Classics of children's literature such as The Railway Children (1906), The Secret Garden (1911) and Swallows and Amazons (1930) portray these largely untouched landscapes as worlds of adventure and transformation where their protagonists can break free of the restrictions of society. Modern poets such as the Poets Laureate Ted Hughes and Simon Armitage have found inspiration in the Northern countryside, producing works that take advantage of the sounds and rhythms of Northern English dialects.

Meanwhile, the industrialising and urbanising cities of the North gave rise to many masterpieces of social realism. Elizabeth Gaskell was the first in a lineage of female realist writers from the North that later included Winifred Holtby, Catherine Cookson, Beryl Bainbridge and Jeanette Winterson. Many of the angry young men of post-war literature were Northern, and working-class life in the face of deindustrialisation is depicted in novels such as Room at the Top (1959), Billy Liar (1959), This Sporting Life (1960) and A Kestrel for a Knave (1968).

=== Other languages ===
There are no recognised minority languages in Northern England, although the Northumbrian Language Society campaigns to have the Northumbrian dialect recognised as a separate language. It is possible that traces of now-extinct Brythonic Celtic languages from the region survive in some rural areas in the Yan Tan Tethera counting systems traditionally used by shepherds.

Contact between English and immigrant languages has given rise to new accents and dialects. For instance, the variety of English spoken by Poles in Manchester is distinct both from typical Polish-accented English and from Mancunian. At a local level, the diversity of immigrant communities means that some languages that are extremely rare in the country as a whole have strongholds in Northern towns: Bradford for instance has the largest proportion of Pashto speakers, while Manchester has most Cantonese speakers.

== History ==
=== The prehistoric North ===
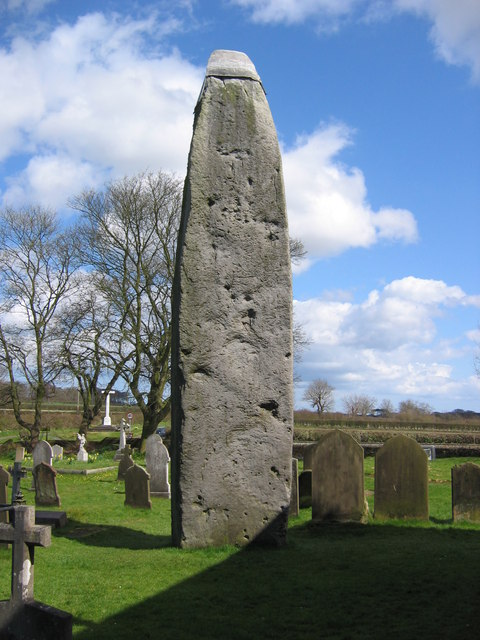
Rudston Monolith, from the late Neolithic or early Bronze Age, is the tallest megalith in Great Britain.

During the ice ages, Northern England was buried under ice sheets, and little evidence remains of habitation – either because the climate made the area uninhabitable, or because glaciation destroyed most evidence of human activity. The northernmost cave art in Europe is found at Creswell Crags in northern Derbyshire, near modern-day Sheffield, which shows signs of Neanderthal inhabitation 50 to 60 thousand years ago, and of a more modern occupation known as the Creswellian culture around 12,000 years ago. Kirkwell Cave in Lower Allithwaite, Cumbria shows signs of the Federmesser culture of the Paleolithic, and was inhabited some time between 13,400 and 12,800 years ago.

Significant settlement appears to have begun in the Mesolithic era, with Star Carr in North Yorkshire generally considered the most significant monument of this era. The Star Carr site includes Britain's oldest known house, from around 9000 BC, and the earliest evidence of carpentry in the form of a carved tree trunk from 11000 BC.

The Lincolnshire and Yorkshire Wolds around the Humber Estuary were settled and farmed in the Bronze Age, and the Ferriby Boats – one of the best-preserved finds of the era – were discovered near Hull in 1937. In the more mountainous regions of the Peak District, hillforts were the main Bronze Age settlement and the locals were most likely pastoralists raising livestock.

=== Iron Age and the Romans ===
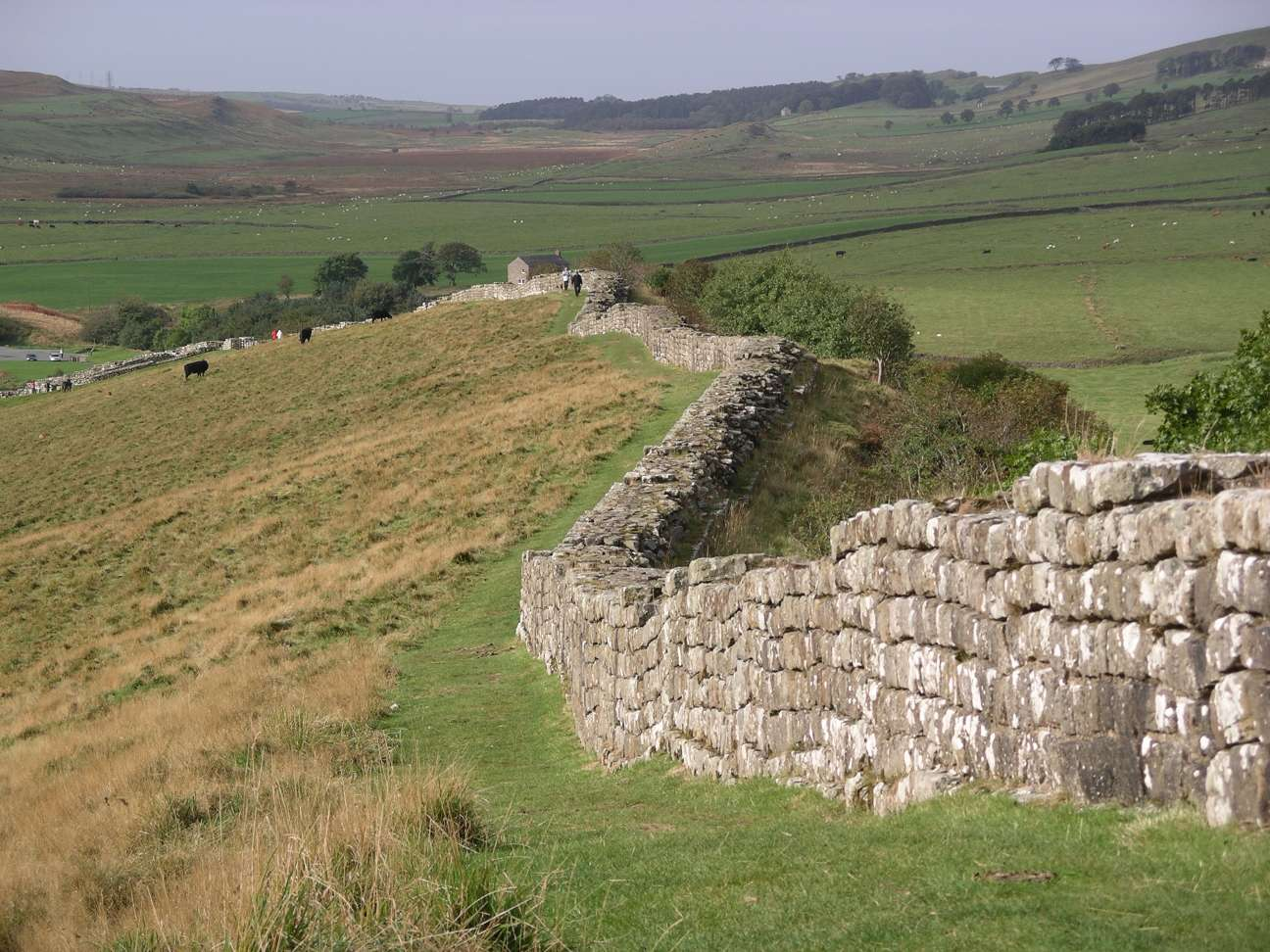
Hadrian's Wall, one of the most famous Roman remains in Northern England, is now a World Heritage Site.

Roman histories name the Celtic tribe that occupied the majority of Northern England as the Brigantes, likely meaning "Highlanders". Whether the Brigantes were a unified group or a looser federation of tribes around the Pennines is debated, but the name appears to have been adopted by the inhabitants of the region, which was known by the Romans as Brigantia. Other tribes mentioned in ancient histories, which may have been part of the Brigantes or separate nations, are the Carvetii of modern-day Cumbria and the Parisi of east Yorkshire.

The Brigantes allied with the Roman Empire during the Roman conquest of Britain: Tacitus records that they handed the resistance leader Caratacus over to the Empire in 51. Power struggles within the Brigantes made the Romans wary, and they were conquered in a war beginning in the 70s under the governorship of Quintus Petillius Cerialis. The Romans created the province of "Britannia Inferior" (Lower Britain) in the North, and it was ruled from the city of Eboracum (modern York). Eboracum and Deva Victrix (modern Chester) were the main legionary bases in the region, with other smaller forts including Mamucium (Manchester) and Cataractonium (Catterick). Britannia Inferior extended as far north as Hadrian's Wall, which was the northernmost border of the Roman Empire. (Note: The Antonine Wall, across what is now the Central Belt of Scotland, was even further north, but Roman control over this area was limited.) Although the Romans invaded modern-day Northumberland and part of Scotland beyond it, they never succeeded in conquering the reaches of Britain beyond the River Tyne.

=== Anglo-Saxons and Vikings ===
Great Britain in 878: Northumbria Other Anglo-Saxons Danelaw Celts

After the end of Roman rule in Britain and the arrival of the Angles, the "Old North" (Yr Hen Ogledd) was divided into rival kingdoms, Bernicia, Deira, Rheged and Elmet. Bernicia covered lands north of the Tees, Deira corresponded roughly to the eastern half of modern-day Yorkshire, Rheged to Cumbria, and Elmet to the western-half of Yorkshire. Bernicia and Deira were first united as Northumbria by Aethelfrith, a king of Bernicia who conquered Deira around the year 604. Northumbria then saw a Golden Age in cultural, scholarly and monastic activity, centred on Lindisfarne and aided by Irish monks. The north-west of England retained vestiges of a Celtic culture, and had its own Celtic language, Cumbric, spoken predominately in Cumbria until around the 12th century.

Parts of the north and east of England were subject to Danish control (the Danelaw) during the Viking Age, but the northern part of the old Anglo-Saxon kingdom of Northumbria remained under Anglo-Saxon control. (Note: In this context "Dane", from Old English word Dene, refers to Scandinavians of any kind. Most of the invaders were from modern Denmark (East Norse speakers), but some were Norwegians (West Norse speakers).) Under the Vikings, monasteries were largely wiped out, and the discovery of grave goods in Northern churchyards suggests that Norse funeral rites replaced Christian ones for a time. Viking control of certain areas, particularly around Yorkshire, is recalled in the etymology of many place names: the thorpe in town names such as Cleethorpes and Scunthorpe, the kirk in Kirklees and Ormskirk and the by of Whitby and Grimsby all have Norse roots.

=== Norman Conquest and the Middle Ages ===
The Historic county town strongholds

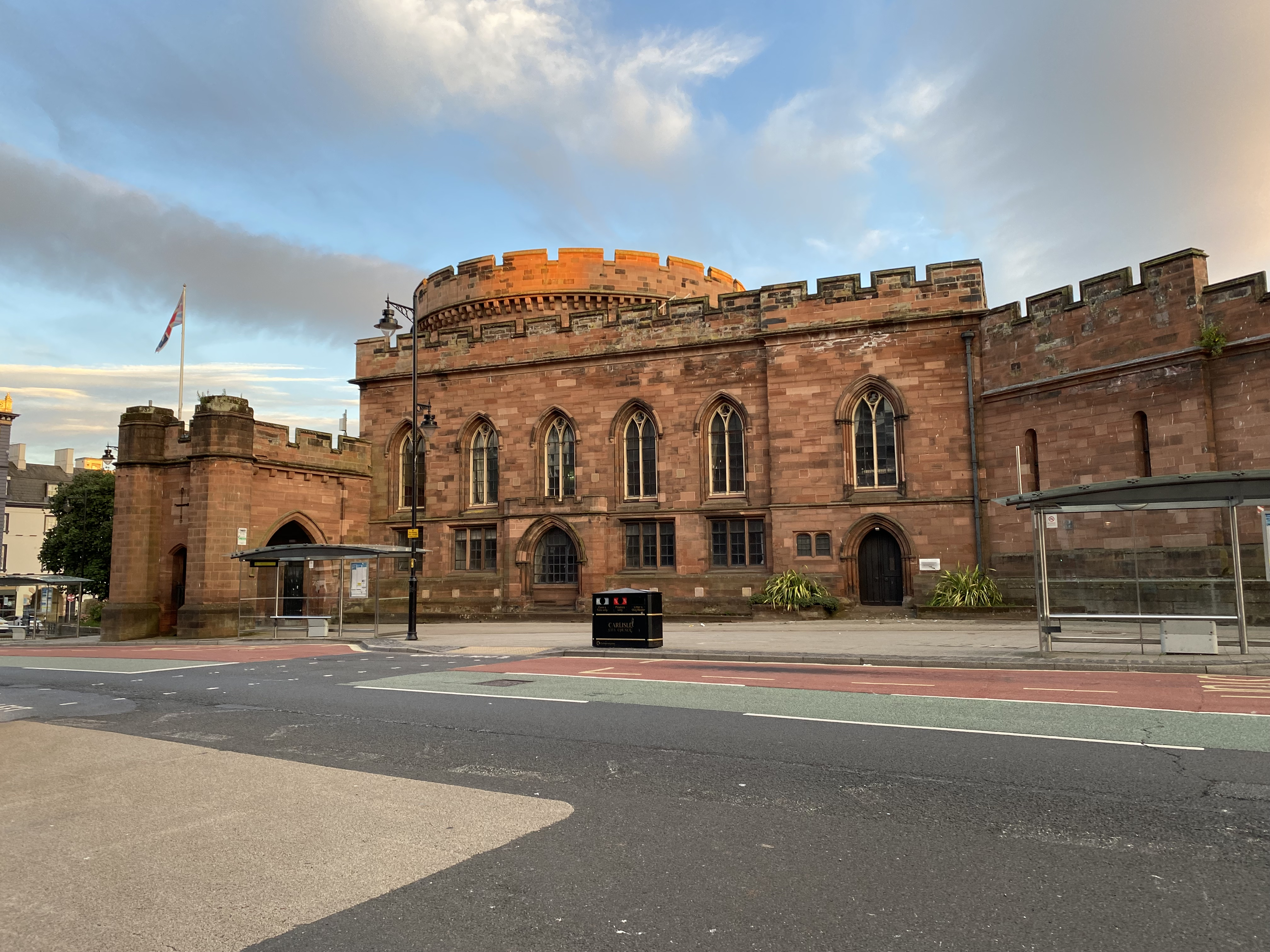
Carlisle Citadel

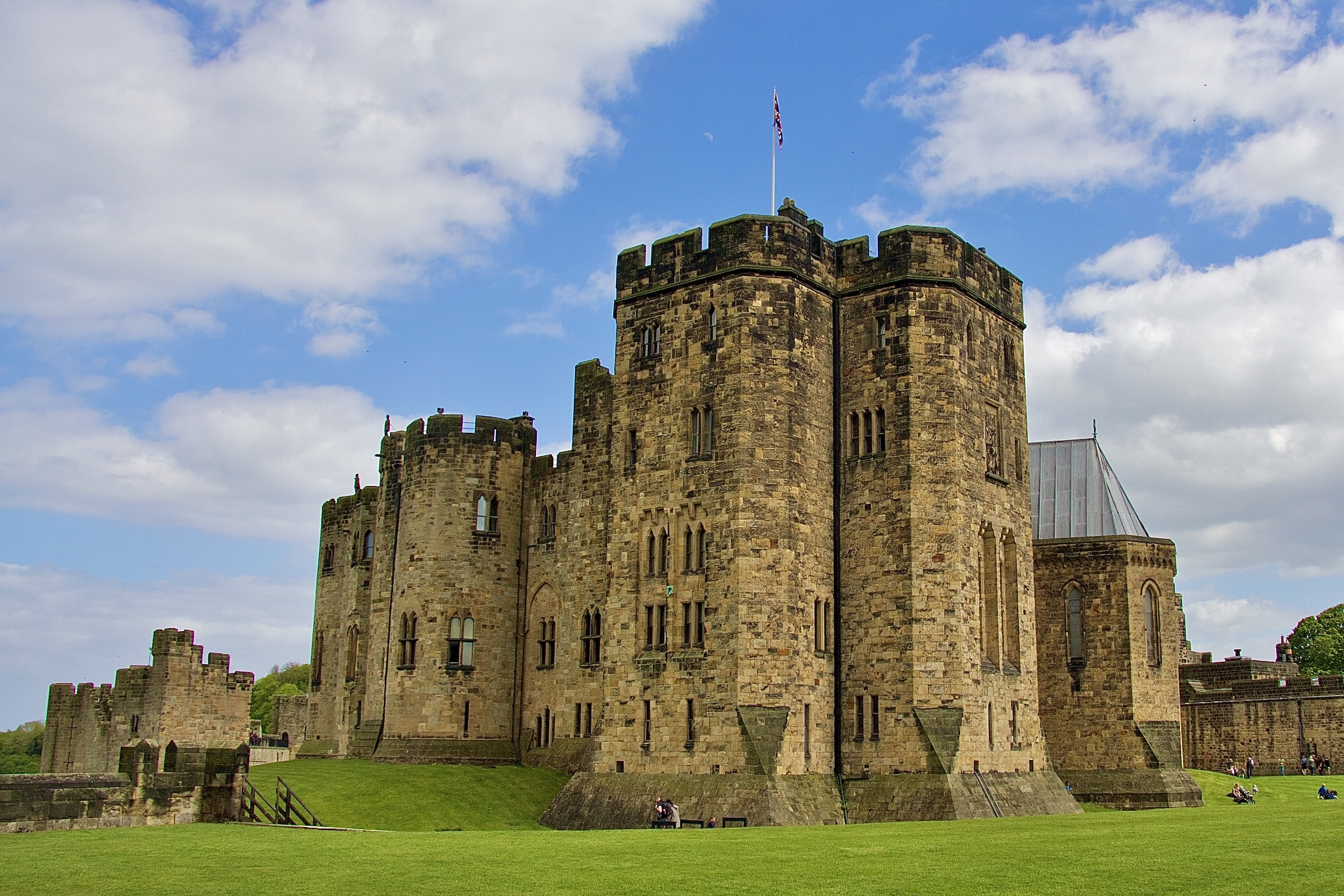
Alnwick Castle

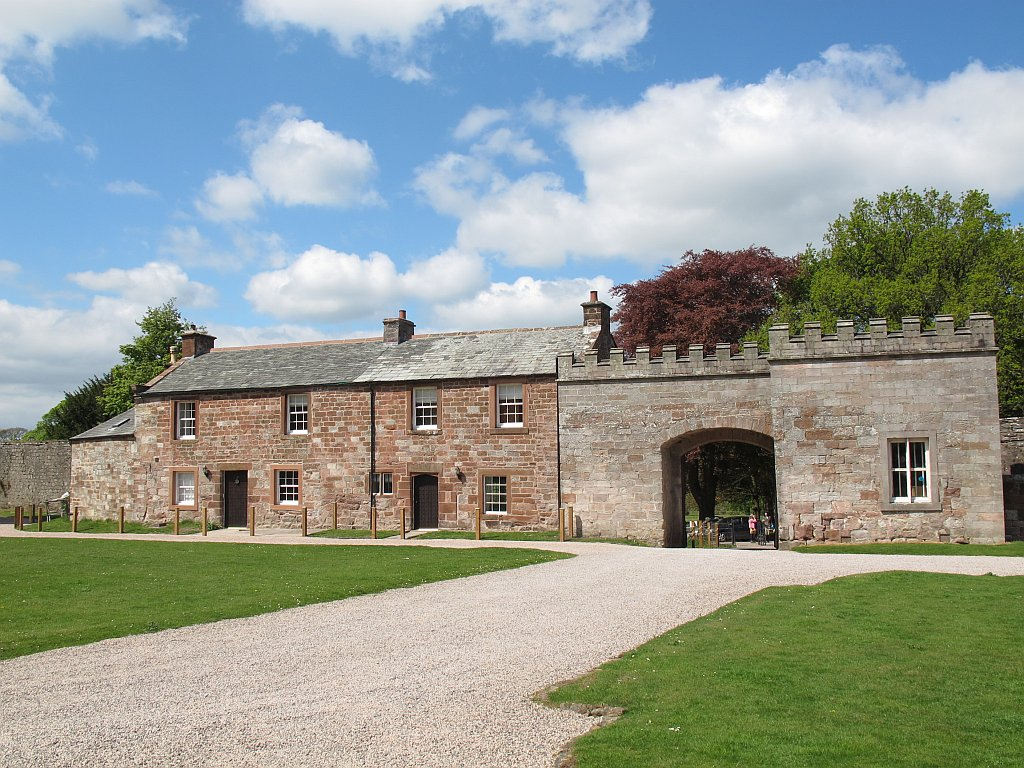
Appleby Castle

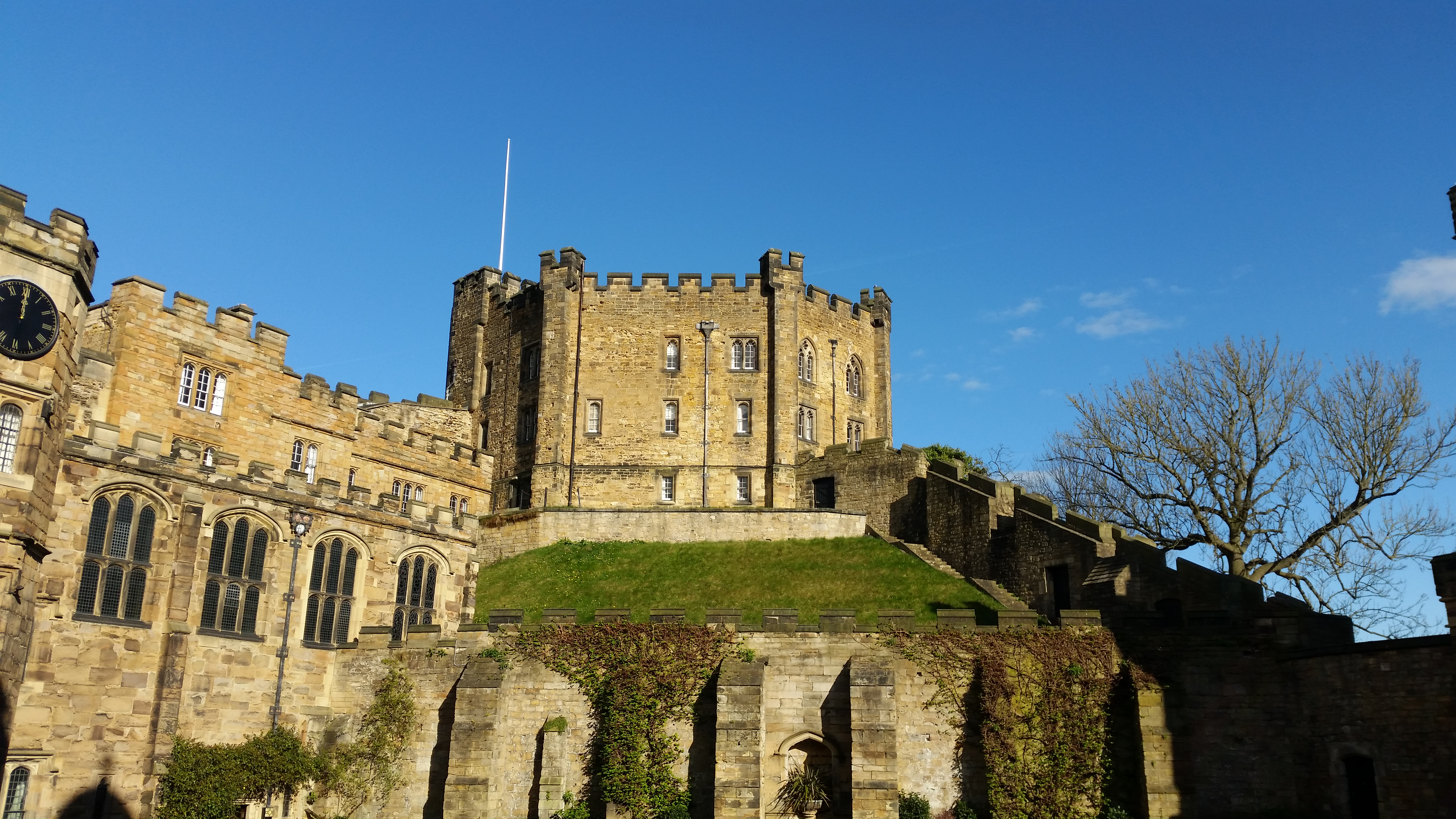
Durham Castle

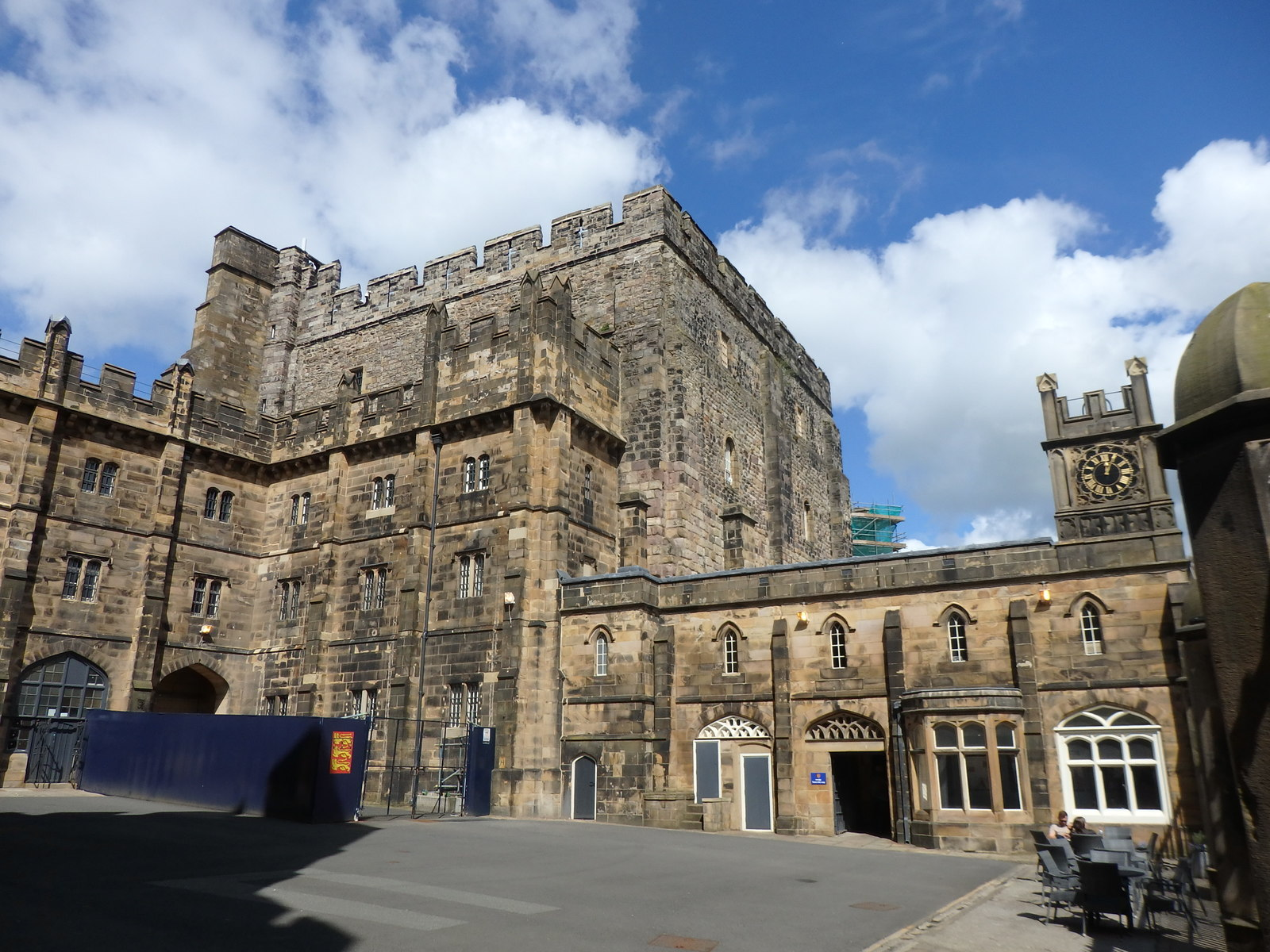
Lancaster Castle

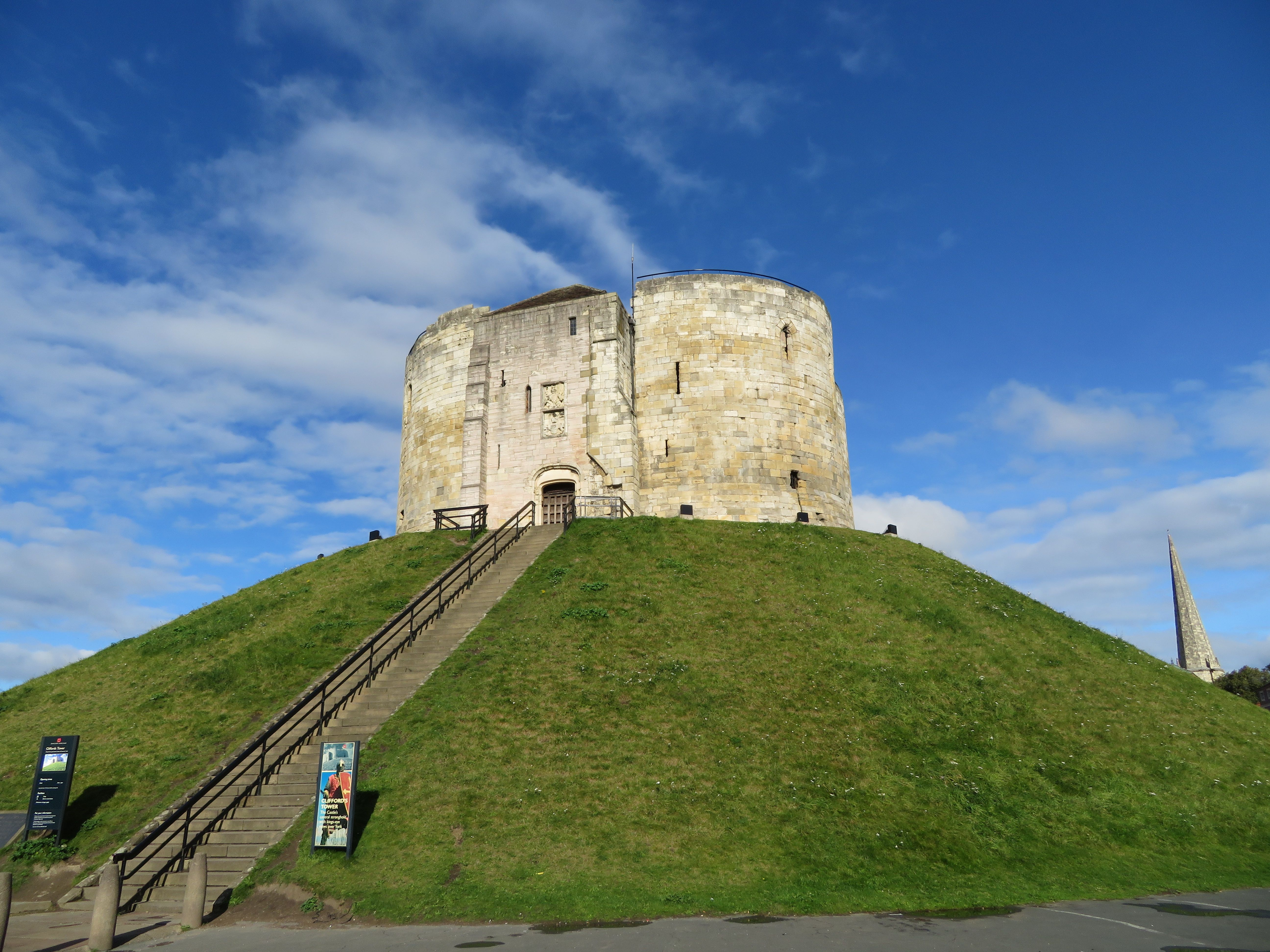
York Castle

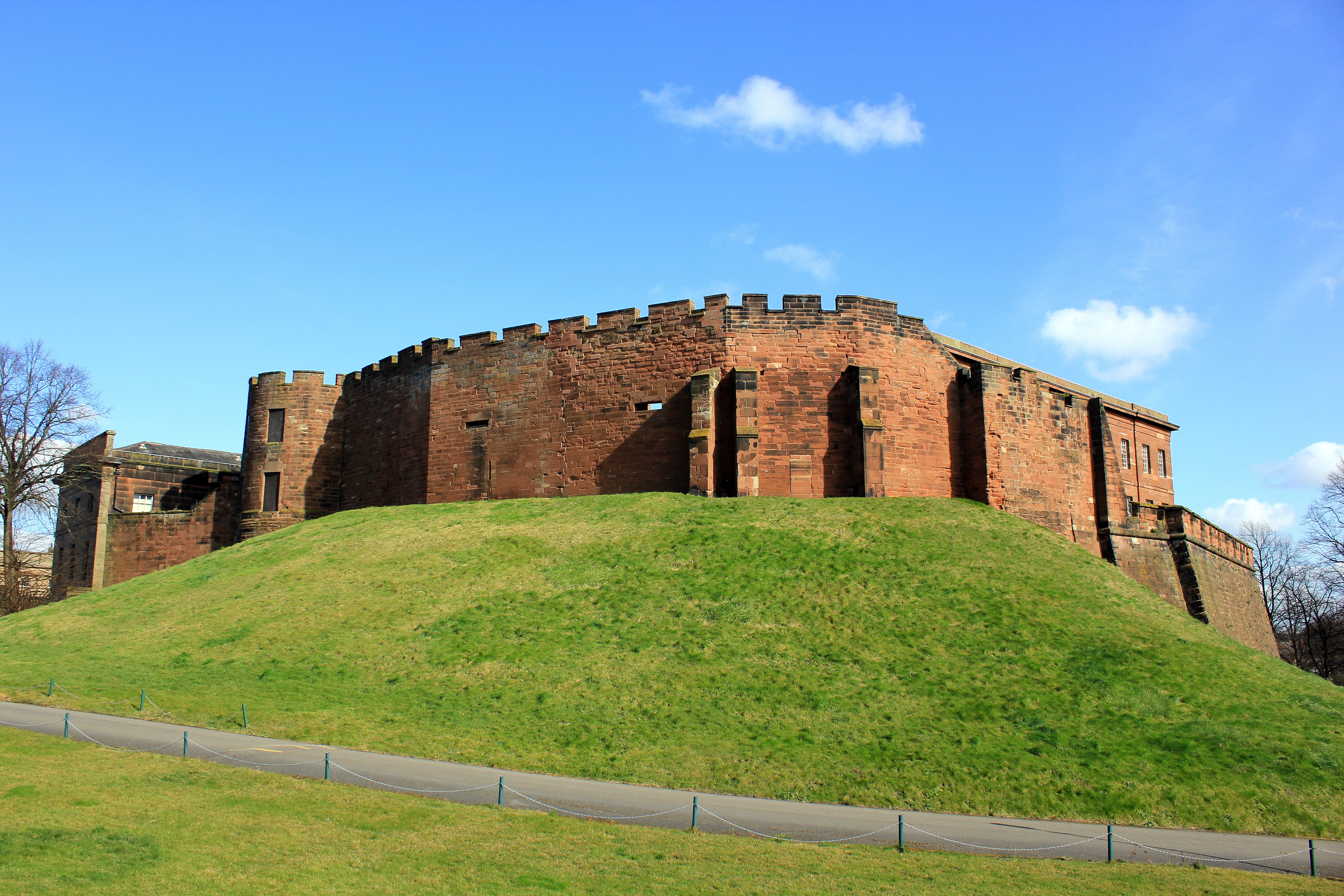
Chester Castle

The 1066 defeat of the Norwegian king Harald Hardrada by the Anglo-Saxon Harold Godwinson at the Battle of Stamford Bridge near York marked the beginning of the end of Viking rule in England, and the almost immediate defeat of Godwinson at the hands of the Norman William the Conqueror at the Battle of Hastings was in turn the overthrow of the Anglo-Saxon order. The Northumbrian and Danish aristocracy resisted the Norman Conquest, and to put an end to the rebellion, William ordered the Harrying of the North. In the winter of 1069–1070, towns, villages and farms were systematically destroyed across much of Yorkshire as well as northern Lancashire and County Durham. The region was gripped by famine and much of Northern England was deserted. Chroniclers at the time reported a hundred thousand deaths – modern estimates place the total somewhere in the tens of thousands, out of a population of two million. When the Domesday Book was compiled in 1086, much of Northern England was still recorded as wasteland, although this may have been in part because the chroniclers, more interested in manorial farmland, paid little attention to pastoral areas.

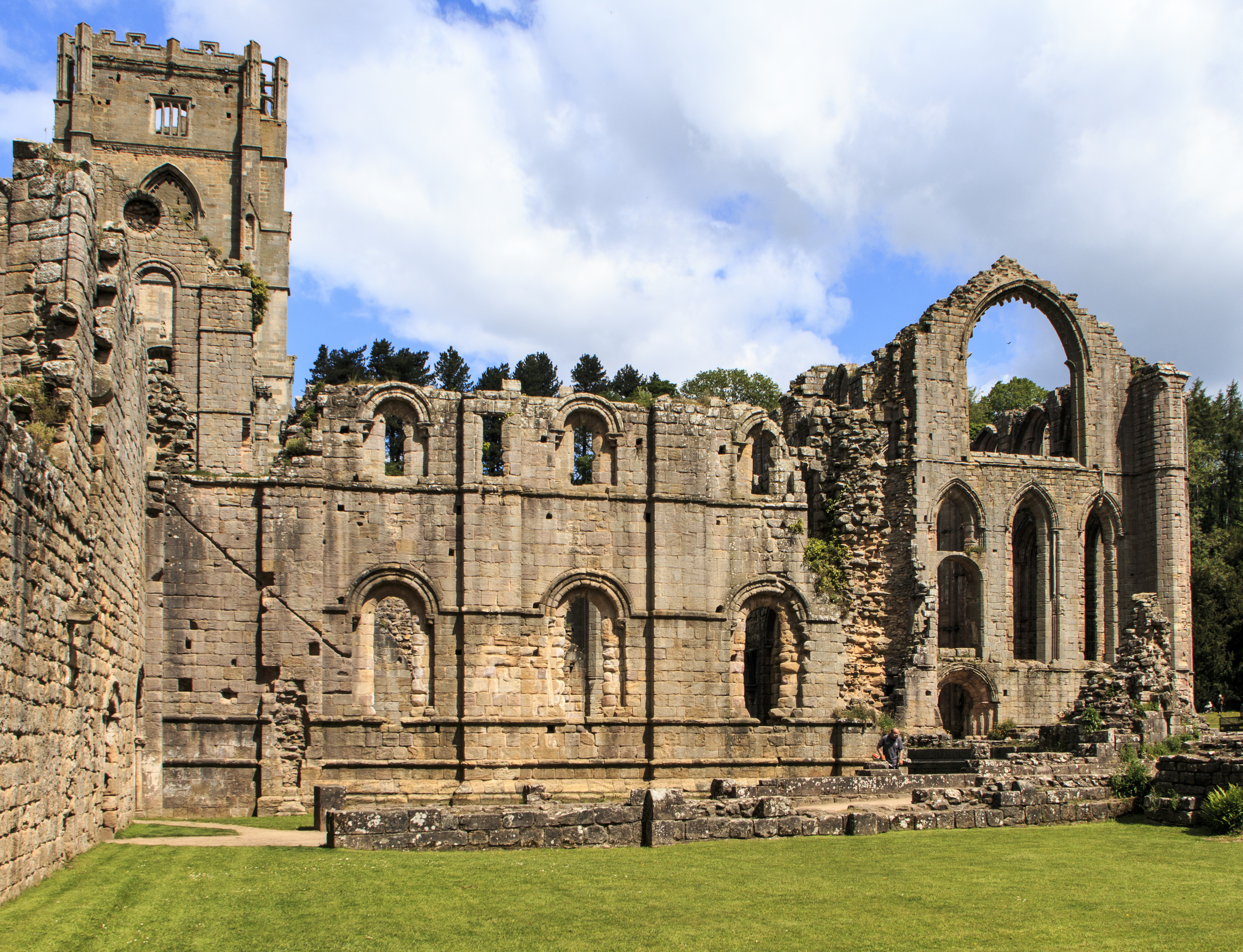
The ruins of Fountains Abbey, now another World Heritage Site

Following Norman subjugation, monasteries returned to the North as missionaries sought to "settle the desert". Monastic orders such as the Cistercians became significant players in the economy of Northern England – the Cistercian Fountains Abbey in North Yorkshire became the largest and richest of the Northern abbeys, and would remain so until the Dissolution of the Monasteries. Other Cistercian abbeys are at Rievaulx, Kirkstall and Byland. The 7th-century Whitby Abbey was Benedictine and Bolton Abbey, Augustinian. A significant Flemish immigration followed the conquest, which likely populated much of the desolated regions of Cumbria, and which was persistent enough that the town of Beverley in the East Riding of Yorkshire still had an ethnic enclave called Flemingate in the thirteenth century.

During the Anarchy, Scotland invaded Northern England and took much of the land north of the Tees. In the 1139 peace treaty that followed, Prince Henry of Scotland was made Earl of Northumberland and kept the counties of Cumberland, Westmorland and Northumbria, as well as part of Lancashire. These reverted to English control in 1157, establishing for the most part the modern England–Scotland border. The region also saw violence during The Great Raid of 1322 when Robert the Bruce invaded and raided the whole of Northern England. There was also the Wars of the Roses, including the decisive Battle of Wakefield, although the modern-day conception of the war as a conflict between Lancashire and Yorkshire is anachronistic – Lancastrians recruited from across Northern England, including Yorkshire, even requiring mercenaries from Scotland and France, while the Yorkists drew most of their power from Southern England, Wales and Ireland. The Anglo-Scottish Wars also touched the region, and in just 400 years, Berwick-upon-Tweed – now the northernmost town in England – changed hands more than a dozen times. The wars also saw thousands of Scots settle south of the border, chiefly in the border counties and Yorkshire.

=== Early modern era ===
After the English Reformation, the North saw several Catholic uprisings, including the Lincolnshire Rising, Bigod's Rebellion in Cumberland and Westmorland, and largest of all, the Yorkshire-based Pilgrimage of Grace, all against Henry VIII. His daughter Elizabeth I faced another Catholic rebellion, the Rising of the North. The region would become the centre of recusancy as prominent Catholic families in Cumbria, Lancashire and Yorkshire refused to convert to Protestantism. Royal power over the region was exercised through the Council of the North at King's Manor, York, which was founded in 1484 by Richard III. The Council existed intermittently for the next two centuries – its final incarnation was created in the aftermath of the Pilgrimage of Grace and was chiefly an institution for providing order and dispensing justice.

Northern England was a focal point for fighting during the Wars of the Three Kingdoms. The border counties were invaded by Scotland in the Second Bishops' War, and at the 1640 Treaty of Ripon King Charles I was forced to temporarily cede Northumberland and County Durham to the Scots and pay to keep the Scottish armies there. To raise enough funds and ratify the final peace treaty, Charles had to call what became the Long Parliament, beginning the process that led to the First English Civil War. In 1641, the Long Parliament abolished the Council of the North for perceived abuses during the Personal Rule period. By the time war broke out in 1642, King Charles had moved his court to York, and Northern England was to become a major base of the Royalist forces until they were routed at the Battle of Marston Moor.

=== Industrial Revolution ===
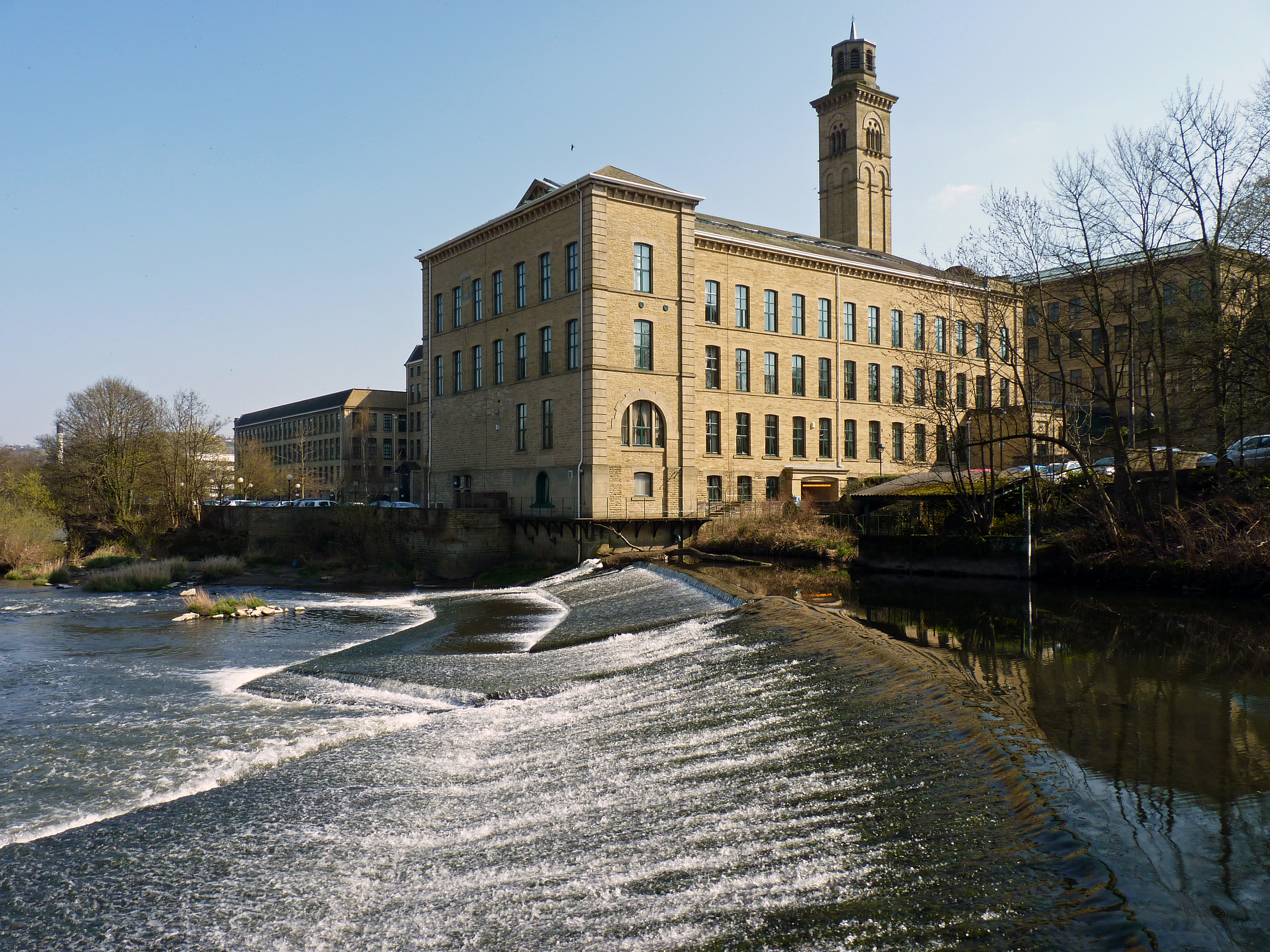
Salts Mill in Saltaire, West Yorkshire, one of two industrial World Heritage Sites in the North

At the beginning of the Industrial Revolution, Northern England had plentiful coal and water power while the poor agriculture in the uplands meant that labour in the area was cheap. Mining and milling, which had been practised on a small scale in the area for generations, began to grow and centralise. The boom in industrial textile manufacture is sometimes attributed to the damp climate and soft water making it easier to wash and work fibres, although the success of Northern fabric mills has no single clear source. Readily available coal and the discovery of large iron deposits in Cumbria and Cleveland allowed ironmaking and, with the invention of the Bessemer process, steelmaking to take root in the region. High quality steel in turn fed the shipyards that opened along the coasts, especially on Tyneside and at Barrow-in-Furness.

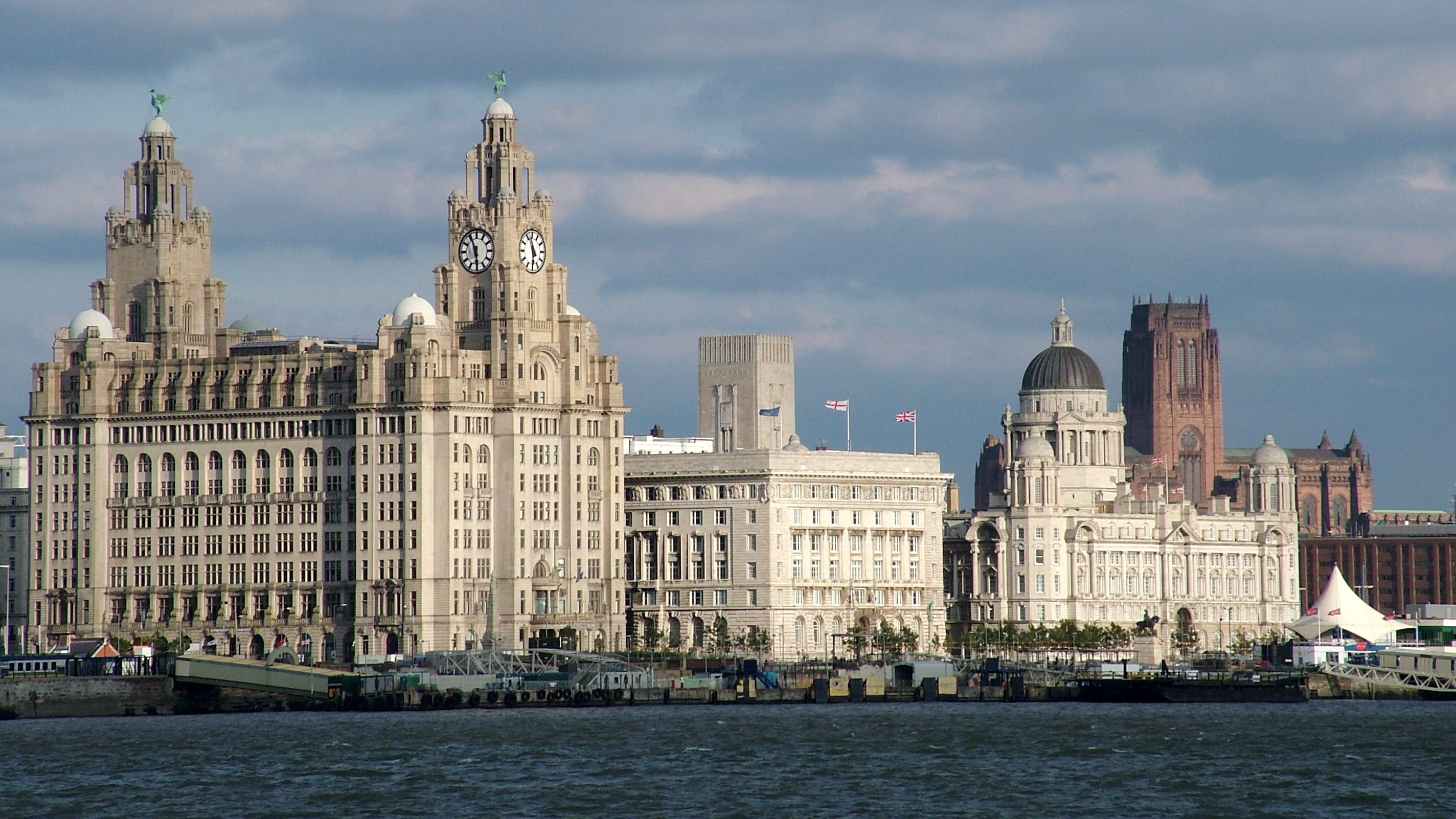
Pier Head, now part of the Liverpool Maritime Mercantile City former World Heritage Site, greeted migrants from around the world.

The Great Famine in Ireland of the 1840s drove migrants across the Irish Sea, and many settled in the industrial cities of the North, especially Manchester and Liverpool – at the 1851 census, 13% of the population of Manchester and Salford were Irish-born, and in Liverpool the figure was 22%. In response there was a wave of anti-Catholic riots and Protestant Orange Orders proliferated across Northern England, chiefly in Lancashire, but also elsewhere in the North. By 1881 there were 374 Orange organisations in Lancashire, 71 in the North East, and 42 in Yorkshire. From further afield, Northern England saw immigration from European countries such as Germany, Italy, Poland, Russia and Scandinavia. Some immigrants were well-to-do industrialists seeking to do business in the booming industrial cities, some were escaping poverty, some were servants or slaves, some were sailors who chose to settle in the port towns, some were Jews fleeing pogroms on the continent, and some were migrants originally stranded at Liverpool after attempting to catch an onwards ship to the United States or to colonies of the British Empire. At the same time, hundreds of thousands from depressed rural areas of the North emigrated, chiefly to the US, Canada, South Africa, Australia and New Zealand.

=== Deindustrialisation and modern history ===
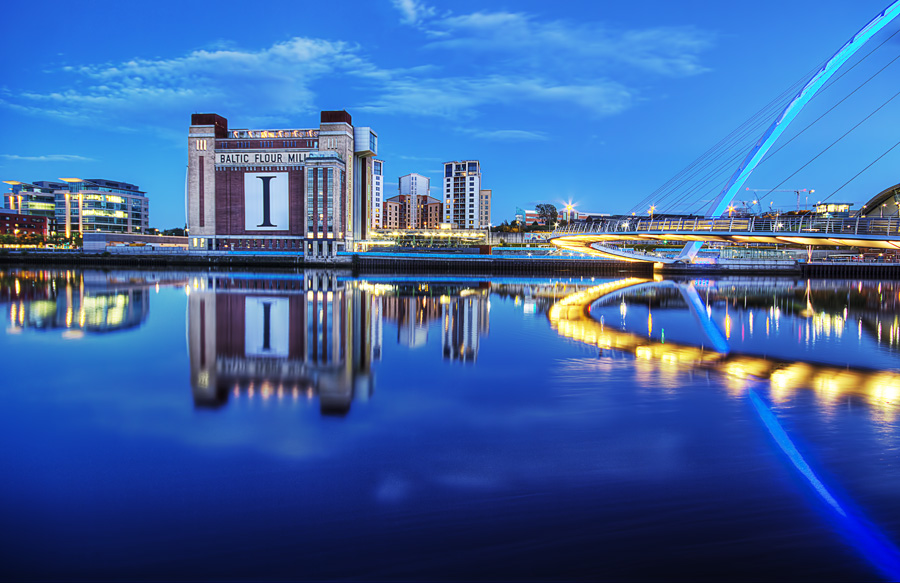
The Baltic Centre for Contemporary Art, formerly an industrial building, is a symbol of the regeneration of Gateshead.

The First World War was the turning point for the economy of Northern England. In the interwar years, the Northern economy began to be eclipsed by the South – in 1913–1914, unemployment in "outer Britain" (the North, plus Scotland and Wales) was 2.6% while the rate in Southern England was more than double that at 5.5%, but in 1937 during the Great Depression the outer British unemployment rate was 16.1% and the Southern rate was less than half that at 7.1%. The weakening economy and interwar unemployment caused several episodes of social unrest in the region, including the 1926 general strike and the Jarrow March. The Great Depression highlighted the weakness of Northern England's specialised economy: as world trade declined, demand for ships, steel, coal and textiles all fell. For the most part, Northern factories were still using nineteenth-century technology, and were not able to keep up with advances in industries such as motors, chemicals and electricals, while the expansion of the electric grid removed the North's advantages in terms of power generation and meant it was now more economic to build new factories in the Midlands or South.

The industrial concentration in Northern England made it a major target for Luftwaffe attacks during the Second World War. The Blitz of 1940–1941 saw major raids on Barrow-in-Furness, Hull, Leeds, Manchester, Merseyside, Newcastle and Sheffield with thousands killed and significant damage done. Liverpool, a vital port for supplies from North America, was especially hard hit – the city was the most bombed in the UK outside London and Hull, with around 4,000 deaths across Merseyside and most of the city centre destroyed. Hull, the worst bombed city outside of London suffered damage to 98% of all buildings, the highest percentage of any town or city. The rebuilding that followed, and the simultaneous slum clearance that saw whole neighbourhoods demolished and rebuilt, transformed the faces of Northern cities. Immigration from the "New Commonwealth", especially Pakistan and Bangladesh, starting in the 1950s reshaped Northern England once more, and there are now significant populations from the Indian subcontinent in towns and cities such as Bradford, Leeds, Preston and Sheffield.

Deindustrialisation continued and unemployment gradually increased during the 1970s, but accelerated during the government of Margaret Thatcher, who chose not to encourage growth in the North if it risked growth in the South. The era saw the 1984–85 miners' strike, which brought hardship for many Northern mining towns. Northern metropolitan county councils, which were Labour strongholds often with very left-wing leadership (such as Militant-dominated Liverpool and the so-called "People's Republic of South Yorkshire"), had high-profile conflicts with the national government. The increasing awareness of the North–South divide strengthened the distinct Northern English identity, which, despite regeneration in some of the major cities, remains to this day.

The region saw several IRA attacks during the Troubles, including the M62 coach bombing, the Warrington bomb attacks and the 1992 and 1996 Manchester bombings. The latter was the largest bomb detonation in Great Britain since the end of the Second World War, and damaged or destroyed much of central Manchester. The attack led to Manchester's ageing infrastructure being rebuilt and modernised, sparking the regeneration of the city and making it a leading example of post-industrial redevelopment followed by other cities in the region and beyond.

== Demographics ==
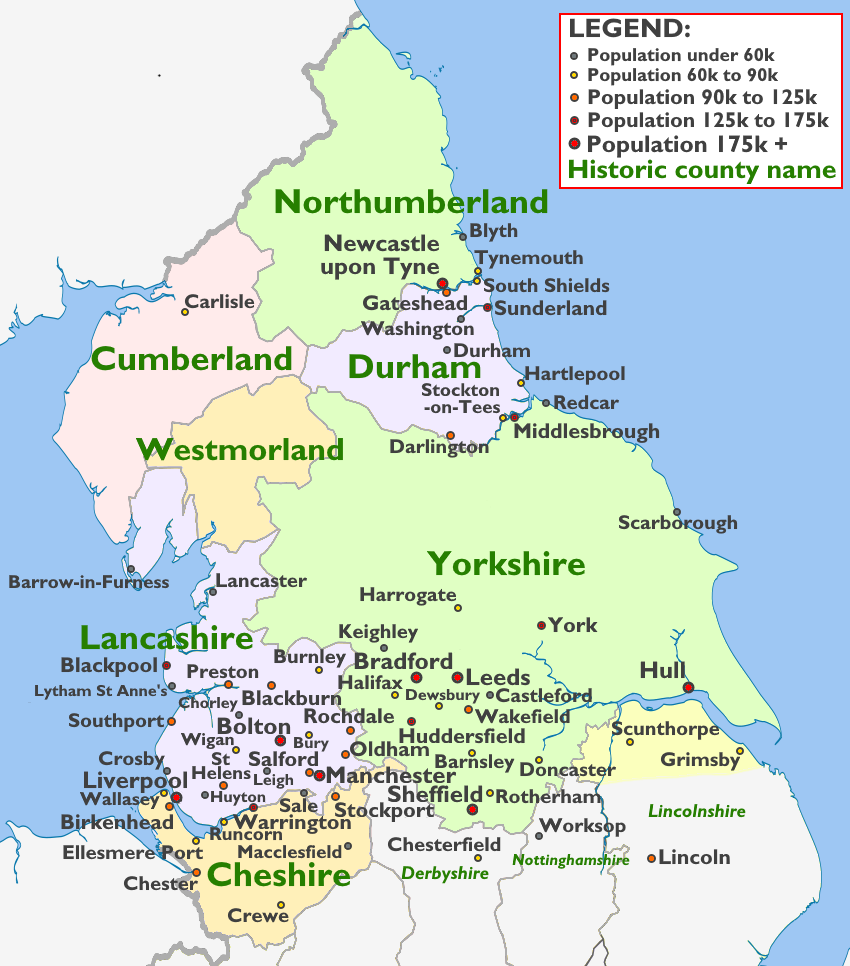
Population centres in Northern England as part of their historic counties

At the 2021 census, Northern England had a population of 15,550,000, in 6,659,700 households. This is an increase from the 14,933,000 (and 6,364,000 households) counted in the 2011 census, and itself a growth of 5.1% from 2001. This means that Northerners comprise 28% of the English population and 24% of the UK population.

Taken overall, 8% of the population of Northern England were born overseas (3% from the European Union including Ireland and 5% from elsewhere), substantially less than the England and Wales average of 13%, and 5% define their nationality as something other than a UK or Irish identity. (Note: UK and Irish identities include British, Cornish, English, Irish, Northern Irish, Scottish and Welsh.) 90.5% of the population described themselves as white, compared to an England and Wales average of 85.9%; other ethnicities represented include Pakistani (2.9%), Indian (1.3%), Black (1.3%), Chinese (0.6%) and Bangladeshi (0.5%). The broad averages hide significant variation within the region: Allerdale and Redcar and Cleveland had a greater percentage of the population identifying as White British (97.6% each) than any other district in England and Wales, while Manchester (66.5%), Bradford (67.4%) and Blackburn with Darwen (69.1%) had among the lowest proportions of White British outside London.

=== Languages ===
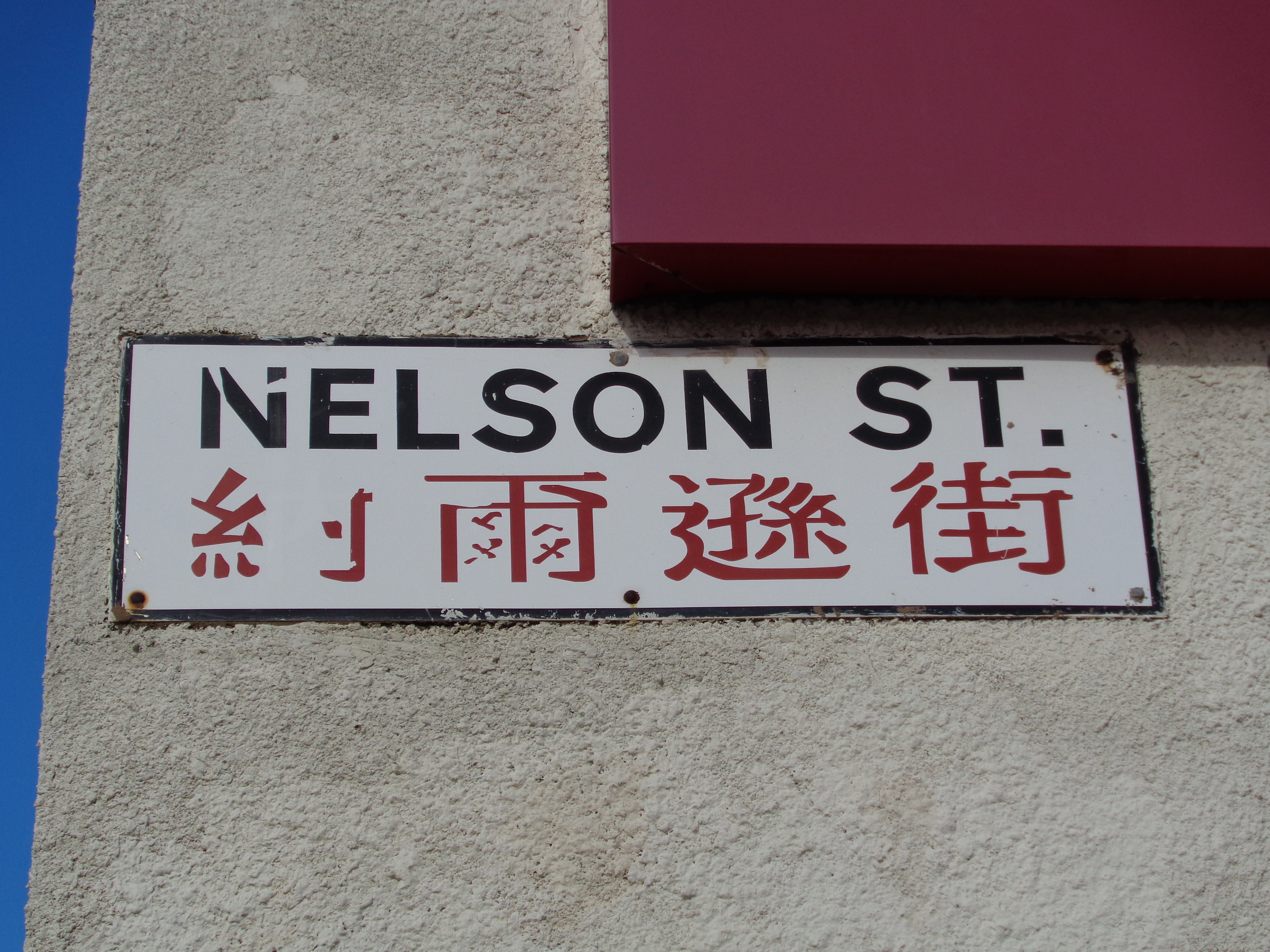
Bilingual English/Chinese signage in Liverpool Chinatown

95% of the Northern population speak English as a first language – compared to an England and Wales average of 92% (Note: Within Wales, native Welsh speakers are counted with native English speakers.) – and another 4% speak English as a second language well or very well. The 5% of the population who have another native language are chiefly speakers of European or South Asian languages. At the 2011 census, the largest languages apart from English were Polish (spoken by 0.7% of the population), Urdu (0.6%) and Punjabi (0.5%), and 0.4% of the population speak a variety of Chinese: a similar distribution to that in the whole of England. Redcar and Cleveland has the largest proportion of the population speaking English as a first language in England, with 99.3%.

=== Religion ===
At the 2011 census, the North East and North West had the largest proportion of Christians in England and Wales; 67.5% and 67.3% respectively (the proportion in Yorkshire and the Humber was lower at 59.5%). Yorkshire and the Humber and the North West both had significant populations of Muslims – 6.2% and 5.1% respectively – while Muslims in the North East made up only 1.8% of the population. All other faiths combined comprised less than 2% of the population in all regions.

The census question on religion has been criticised by the British Humanist Association as leading, and other surveys of religion tend to find very different results. The 2015 British Election Survey found 52% of Northerners identified as Christian (22% Anglican, 14% non-denominational Christian, 12% Roman Catholic, 2% Methodist, and 2% other Christian denominations), 40% as non-religious, 5% as Muslim, 1% as Hindu and 1% as Jewish.

=== Health ===
Life expectancy at birth for boys in 2012–2014 by local authority district in England and Wales. Lighter colours indicate longer life expectancy.

One major manifestation of the North–South divide is in health and life expectancy statistics. All three Northern England statistical regions have lower than average life expectancies and higher than average rates of cancer, circulatory disease, respiratory disease and obesity. Blackpool has the lowest life expectancy at birth in England – male life expectancy at birth between 2012 and 2014 was 74.7, against an England-wide average of 79.5 – and the majority of English districts in the bottom 50 were in the North East or the North West. However, regional differences do seem to be slowly narrowing: between 1991 and 1993 and 2012–2014, life expectancy in the North East increased by 6.0 years and in the North West by 5.8 years, the fastest increases in any region outside London, and the gap between life expectancy in the North East and South East is now 2.5 years, down from 2.9 in 1993.

These health inequalities manifested during the COVID-19 pandemic in high infection rates, death rates and excess mortality in Northern England, and in severe job losses in the following Great Lockdown recession. By June 2020, the infection rate in Northern England was nearly double that in London, and a study by the Northern Health Science Alliance found that of the six worst affected areas in England during the pandemic in their study, five were located in the North.

== Education ==
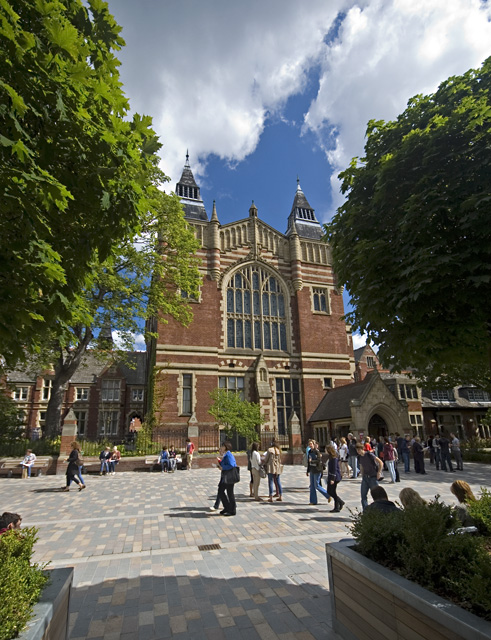
University of Leeds Great Hall

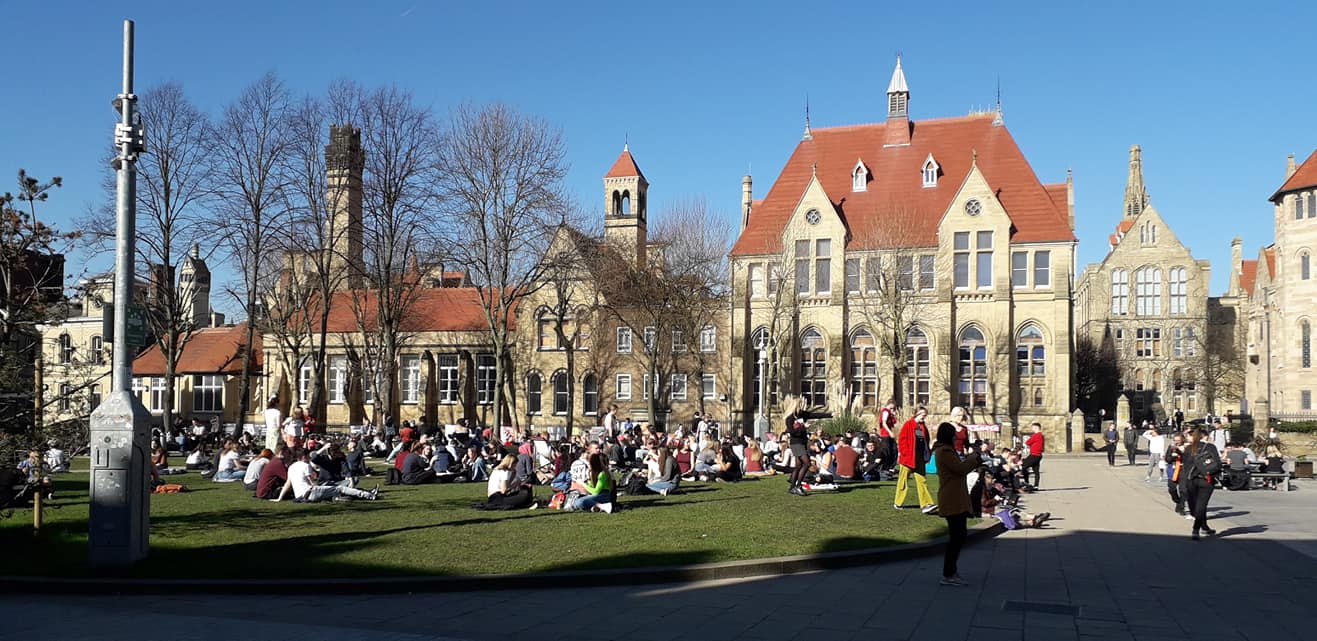
University of Manchester

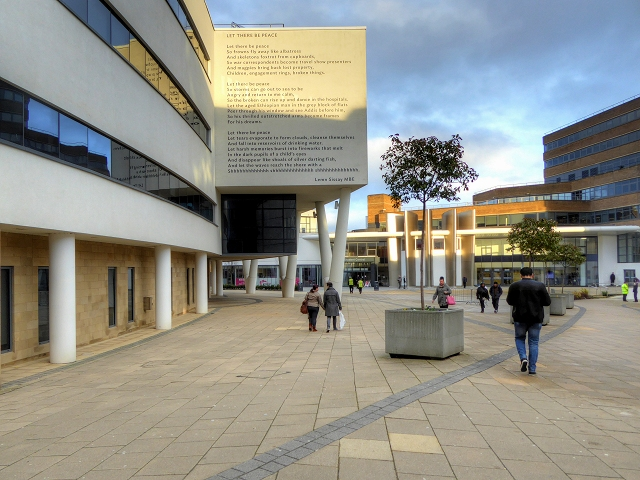
University of Huddersfield Creative Arts Building

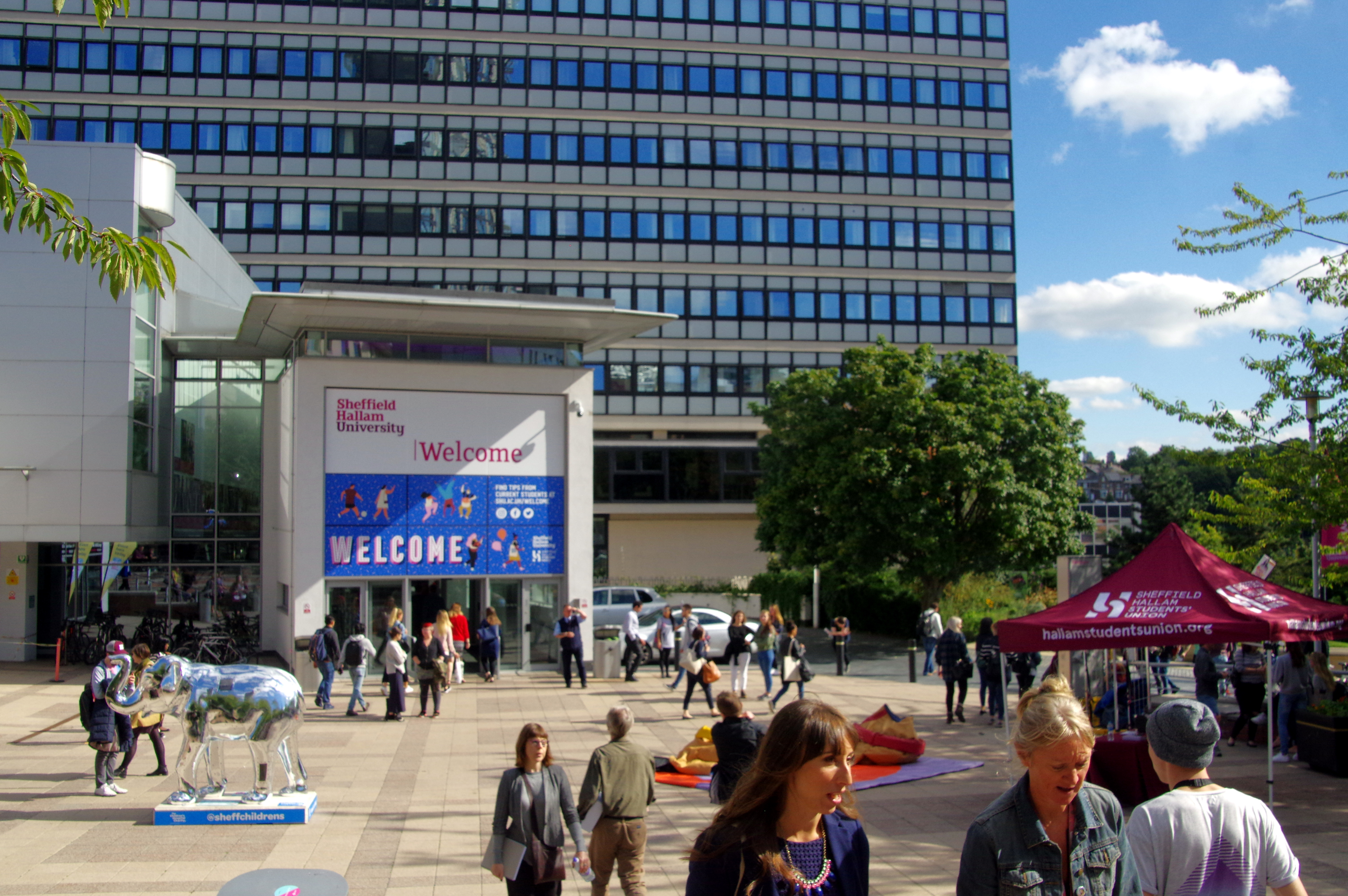
Sheffield Hallam University

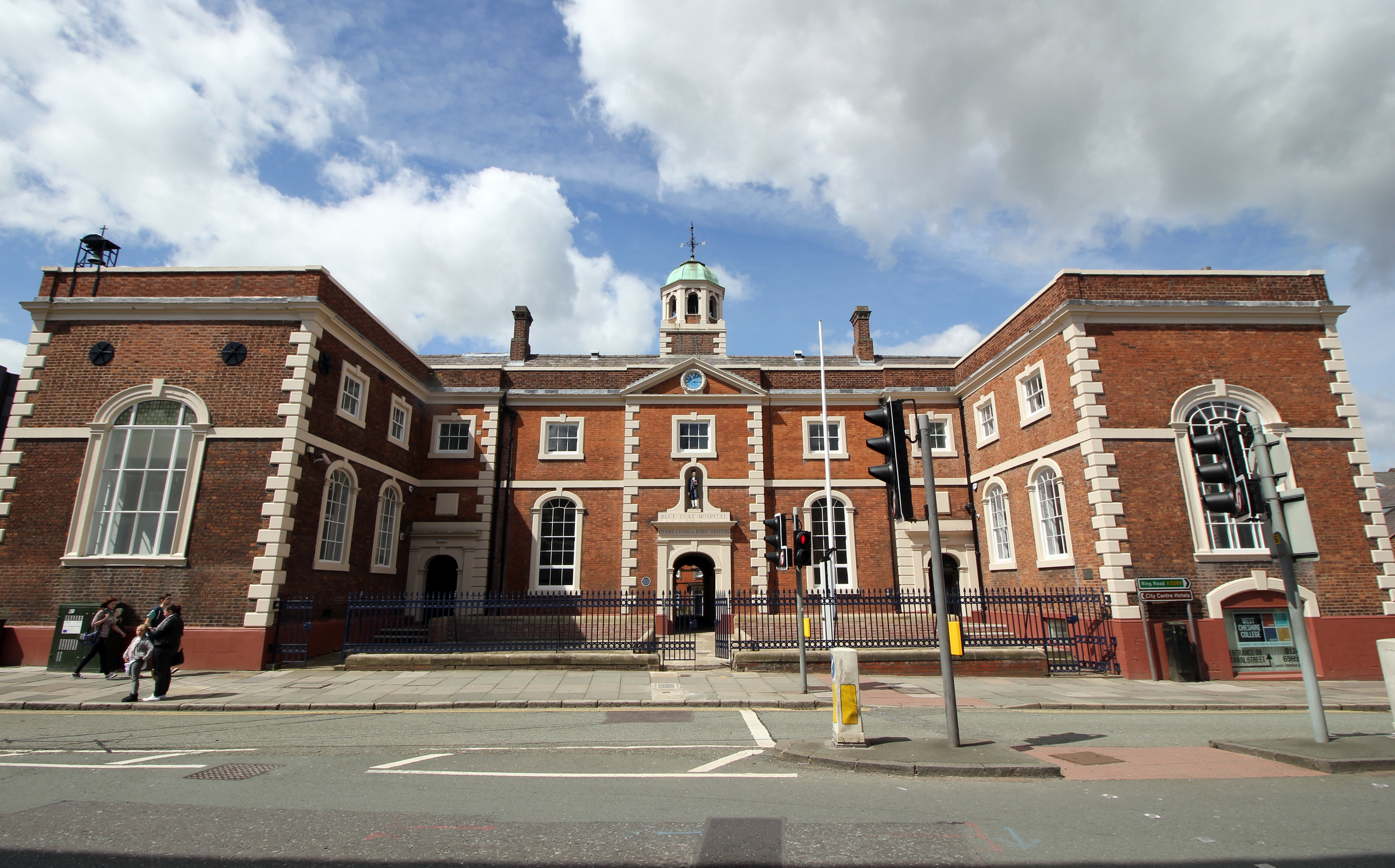
University of Chester Bluecoat School

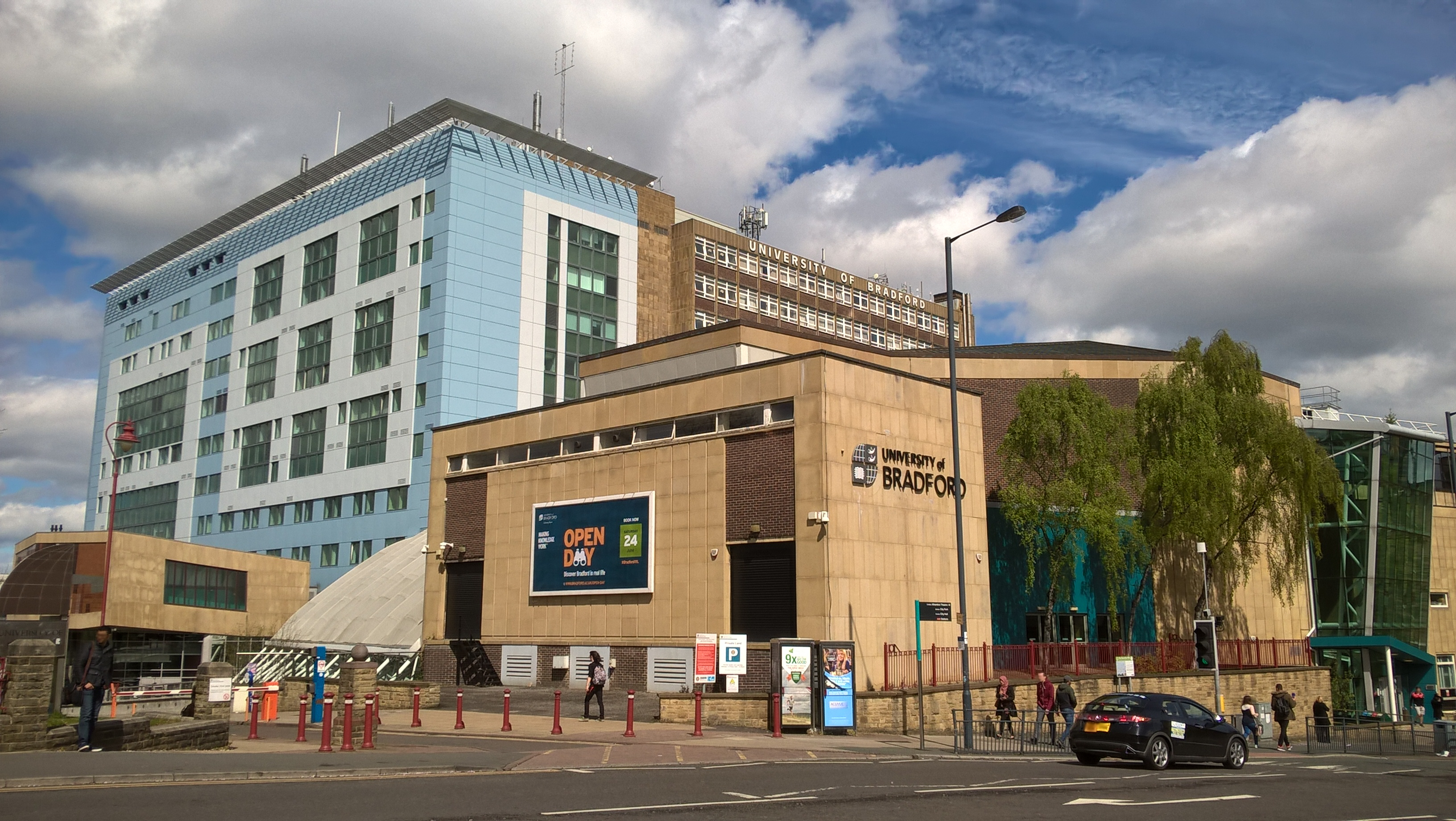
University of Bradford Richmond Building

Before the 19th century, there were no universities in Northern England. The first was the University of Durham, founded in 1832. The next universities built in the North were part of the wave of the late 19th and early 20th centuries, with Durham being joined by five redbrick university institutions (all in the Russell Group of leading research universities): Leeds, Liverpool, Manchester, Newcastle and Sheffield. These six, plus the plateglass universities of York (also in the Russell Group) and Lancaster, form the N8 Research Partnership. The universities of Lancashire, Salford and Teesside are part of the University Alliance. Other universities in the North include Bolton, Bradford, Chester, Cumbria, Edge Hill, Huddersfield, Hull, Leeds Trinity, Leeds Arts, Liverpool Hope, Liverpool John Moores, Manchester Metropolitan, Northumbria, Sheffield Hallam, Sunderland and York St John.

There is a significant attainment gap between Northern and Southern schools, and pupils in the three regions are less likely than the national average to achieve five higher-tier GCSEs, although this may be down to economic disadvantages faced by Northern pupils rather than a difference in school quality. Northern students are under-represented at Oxbridge, where three times as many places go to southerners as to northerners, and at other Southern universities; while southerners are under-represented at leading Northern universities such as Sheffield, Manchester and Leeds. There are calls for the government to invest in education in disadvantaged parts of Northern England to redress the disparities in educational attainment and university admissions between north and south.

== Economy ==
Like the UK as a whole, the Northern English economy is now dominated by the service sector – in September 2016, 82.2% of workers in the Northern statistical regions were employed in services, compared to 83.7% for the UK as a whole. Manufacturing now employs 9.5%, compared to the national average of 7.6%. The unemployment rate in Northern England is 5.3% compared to an England-wide and UK-wide average of 4.8%, and the North East has the highest unemployment rate in the UK, at 7.0% in December 2016, more than one percentage point higher than any other region. In 2015, the gross value added (GVA) of the Northern English economy was £316 billion, and if it were an independent nation, it would be the tenth largest economy in Europe. The region does have poor growth and productivity rates compared to Southern England and to other EU countries.

Growth, employment and household income have lagged behind the South, and the five most deprived districts in England (Note: Middlesbrough, Knowsley, Hull, Liverpool and Manchester) are all in Northern England, as are ten of the twelve most declining major towns in the UK. (Note: Rochdale, Burnley, Bolton, Blackburn, Hull, Grimsby, Middlesbrough, Bradford, Blackpool and Wigan) The picture is not clear-cut, as the North has areas which are as wealthy as, if not wealthier than, fashionable Southern areas such as Surrey. Yorkshire's Golden Triangle which extends from north Leeds to Harrogate and across to York is an example, as is Cheshire's Golden Triangle, centred on Alderley Edge. There are major disparities even across individual cities: Sheffield Hallam is one of the wealthiest constituencies in the country, and is the richest outside London and the South East, while Sheffield Brightside and Hillsborough, just on the other side of the city, is one of the most deprived. Housing in Northern England is more affordable than the UK average: the median house price in most Northern cities was below £200,000 in 2015 with typical increases of below 10% over the previous five years. However, some areas have seen house prices fall considerably, putting inhabitants at risk of negative equity.

The decline of coal mining and manufacturing in Northern England has led to comparisons with the Rust Belt in the United States. To stimulate the Northern economy, the government has organised a series of programmes to invest in and develop the region, of which the latest as of 2017 is the Northern Powerhouse. The North has also been a significant recipient of European Union Structural Funds. Between 2007 and 2013, EU funds created around 70,000 jobs in the region, and the majority of Northern Powerhouse funding comes from the European Regional Development Fund and the European Investment Bank. The loss of these funds following Brexit, combined with potential reductions in exports to the EU, has been identified as a threat to Northern growth.

=== Public sector ===
The public sector is a major employer in Northern England. Between 2000 and 2008, the majority of new jobs created in Northern England were for the government and its suppliers and contractors. All three Northern regions have public sector employment above the national average, and North East has the highest level in England with 20.2% of the workforce in the public sector as of 2016 – down from 23.4% a decade earlier. The austerity programme under the government of David Cameron saw significant cuts to public services, and the reduction in public sector employment resulted in job losses for around 3% of the Northern England workforce with significant impact on the regional economy.

=== Agriculture and fisheries ===
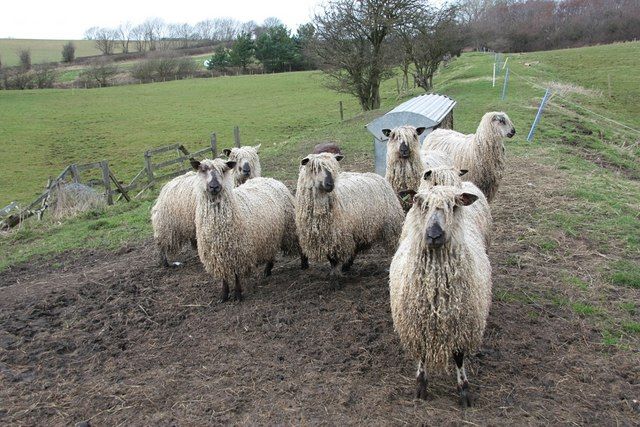
Sheep, such as these Teeswaters, are a major part of Northern English agriculture.

There are 2,580,000 hectares (6,400,000 acres; 25,800 km^{2}; 10,000 sq mi) of farmland in Northern England. The rough Pennine terrain means that most of Northern England is unsuited for growing crops; like Scotland, Northern farming was traditionally dominated by oats, which grow better than wheat in poor soil. Today, the mix of cereals and vegetables grown is similar to that of the UK as a whole, but only a minority of land is arable. Only 32% of Northern farmland is primarily used for growing crops, compared to 49% for England as a whole. Conversely, 57% of the land is given over to rearing livestock, and 33% of England's cattle, 43% of its pigs and 46% of its sheep and lambs are reared in the North.

The only part of the region that is predominantly given over to crops is the land around the Humber estuary, where the well-drained fens result in excellent quality land. The lowland Cheshire Plain is mostly given over to dairy farming, while in the Pennines and Cheviots grazing sheep play an important role not just in agriculture but also in land management more generally. Heather moorland in the Pennine uplands is home to driven grouse shooting from 12 August (the Glorious Twelfth) until 10 December every year. The number of grouse moors in Northern England is a major threat to natural predators, which are often killed by gamekeepers to protect grouse, and as a result, the Cumbria Wildlife Trust describes the North's moors as a "black hole" for the endangered hen harrier.

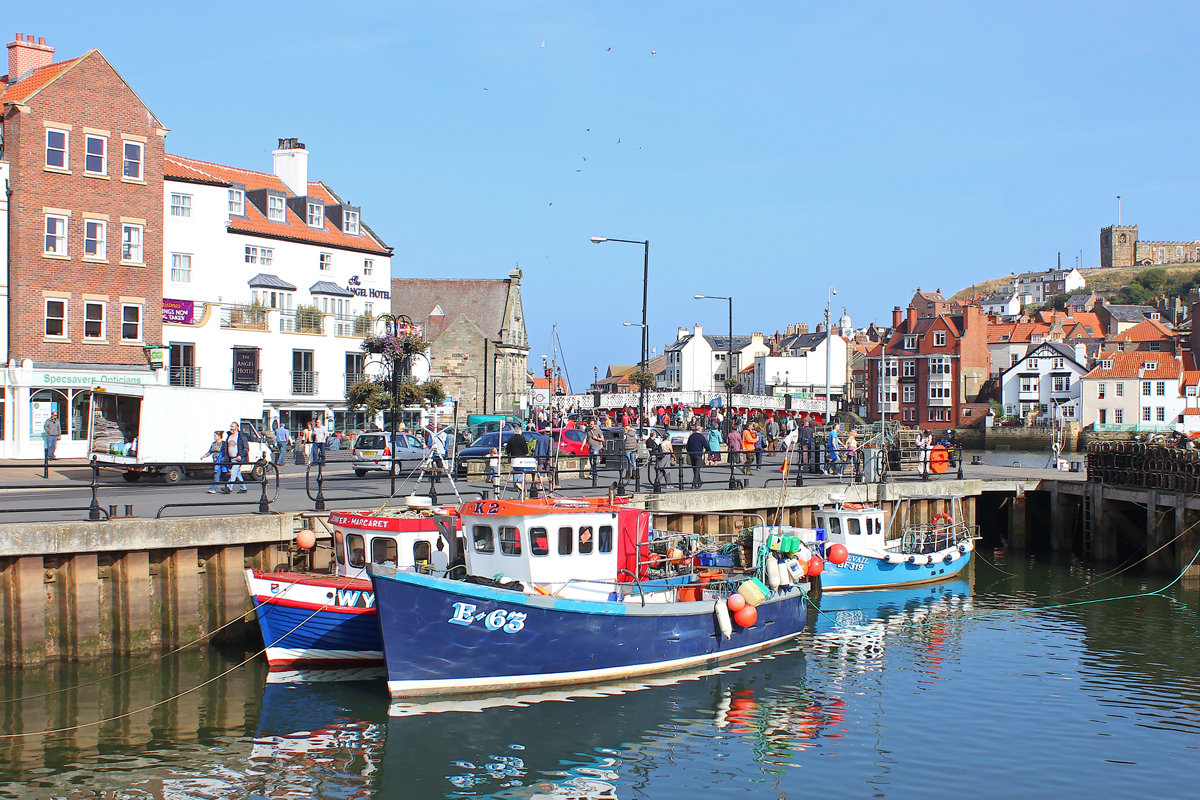
Small fishing boats at Whitby

Sea fishing is an important industry for Northern coastal towns. Major fishing ports include Fleetwood, Grimsby, Hull and Whitby. At its height, Grimsby was the largest fishing port in the world, but the Northern fishing industry suffered greatly from a series of events in the second half of the twentieth century: the Cod Wars with Iceland and establishment of the exclusive economic zone ended British access to rich North Atlantic fishing grounds, while the North Sea was badly overfished and the European Common Fisheries Policy put strict quotas on catches to protect the almost depleted stocks. Grimsby is now transitioning to the processing of imported seafood and to offshore wind to replace its fishing fleet.

=== Manufacturing and energy ===
Northern England has a strong export-based economy, with trade more balanced than the UK average, and the North East is the only region of England to regularly export more than it imports. Chemicals, vehicles, machinery and other manufactured goods make up the majority of Northern exports, just over half of which go to EU countries. Major manufacturing plants include car plants at Vauxhall Ellesmere Port, Jaguar Land Rover Halewood and Nissan Sunderland, the Leyland Trucks factory, the Hitachi Newton Aycliffe train plant, the Humber, Lindsey and Stanlow oil refineries, the NEPIC cluster of chemical works based around Teesside, and the nuclear processing facilities at Springfields and Sellafield.

Offshore oil and gas from North Sea and Irish Sea, and more recently offshore wind power, are significant components in Northern England's energy mix. Although deep-pit coal mining in the UK ended in 2015 with the closure of Kellingley Colliery, North Yorkshire, there are still several open-pit mines in the area. Shale gas is especially prevalent across Northern England, although plans to extract it through hydraulic fracturing ("fracking") have proven to be controversial.

=== Retail and services ===
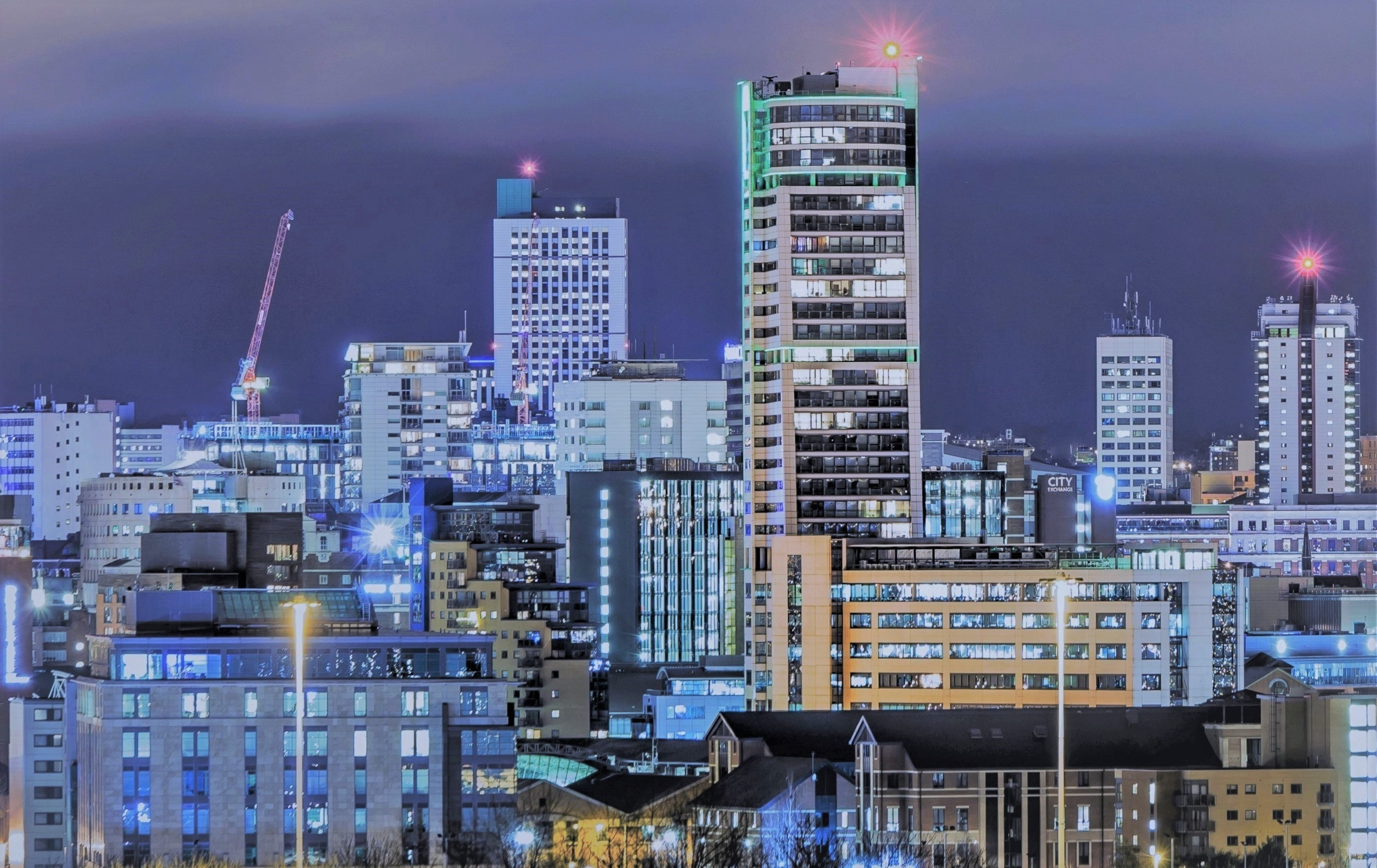
Regeneration has seen Leeds become the second largest financial and legal hub in the UK.

Around 10% of the Northern England workforce is employed in retail. Of the Big Four supermarkets in the UK, two – Asda and Morrisons – are based in the North. Northern England was the birthplace of the modern cooperative movement, and the Manchester-based Co-operative Group has the highest revenue of any firm in the North West. The area is also home to many online retailers, with startups emerging around tech hubs in Northern cities.

With urban regeneration, high-value service sector industries such as corporate services and financial services have taken root in Northern England, with major hubs around Leeds and Manchester. Call centres – attracted by low labour costs and a preference for Northern English accents among the public – have replaced heavy industry as major employers of unskilled workers, with more than 5% of workers in all Northern England regions working in one.

=== High-tech and research ===
Together, the N8 research universities have over 190,000 students and contribute more to the Northern economy in terms of GVA than agriculture, car manufacturing or media. Discoveries and inventions at these universities have resulted in spin-offs worth hundreds of millions to local economies: the discovery of graphene at the University of Manchester produced the National Graphene Institute and the Sir Henry Royce Institute for Advanced Materials, while robotics research at the University of Sheffield led to the development of the Advanced Manufacturing Park.

Recent decades have seen the growth of high-tech companies based around Northern England's major cities. There are eleven high-tech firms worth over $1 billion based in the region, and digital industries support around 300,000 jobs. Game development, online retail, health technology and analytics are among the major high-tech sectors in the North.

=== Leisure and tourism ===
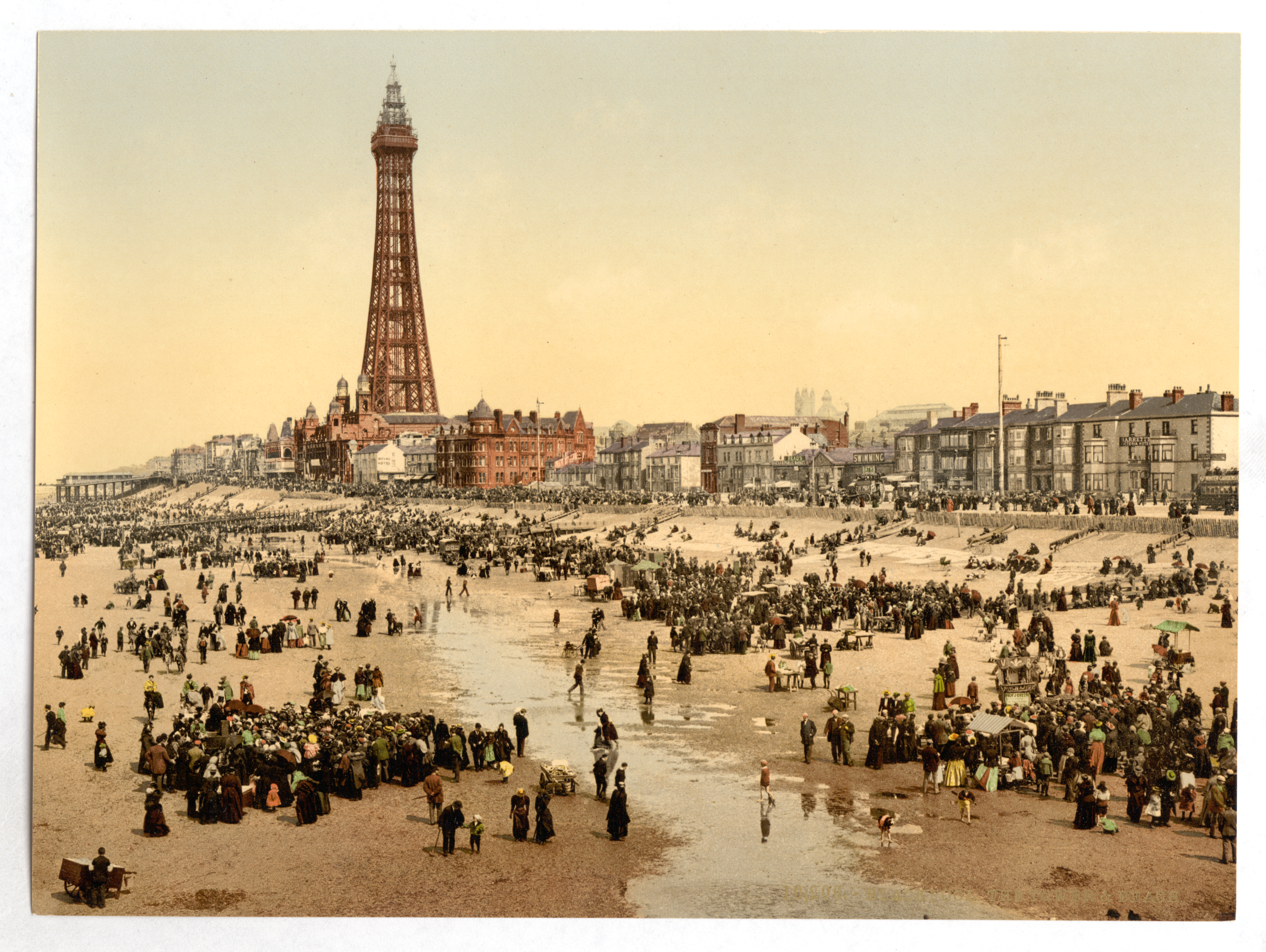
Crowded beaches at Blackpool in the 1890s

The expansion of the railway network in the second half of the nineteenth century meant most in the North lived within reach of the coast, and seaside towns saw a major tourism boom. By around 1870 Blackpool on the Lancashire coast had become overwhelmingly the most popular destination – not just for Northern families, but many from the Midlands and Scotland as well. Other resorts popular with Northerners included Morecambe in northern Lancashire, Whitley Bay near Newcastle, Whitby in North Yorkshire, and New Brighton on the Wirral Peninsula, as well as Rhyl over the border in North Wales.

The same social forces that had built these resorts in the nineteenth century proved to be their undoing in the twentieth. Transport links continued to improve and it became possible to travel overseas quickly and affordably. The Belgian coast at Ostend became popular with Northern working-class tourists in the first half of the twentieth century, and the introduction of package holidays in the 1970s was the death of most Northern seaside resorts. Blackpool has maintained a focus on tourism, and remains one of the most visited towns in England, but visitor numbers are far below their peak and the town's economy has suffered – both employment rates and average earnings remain below the regional average.

The wild landscapes of the North are a major draw for tourists, and many urban areas are looking for regeneration through industrial, heritage and cultural tourism: of the 24 national museums and galleries in England outside London, 14 are located in the North. In 2015, Northern England received around a quarter of all domestic tourism within the UK, with 28.7 million visitors in 2015, but only 8% of international tourists to the United Kingdom visit the region.

=== Telecommunications ===
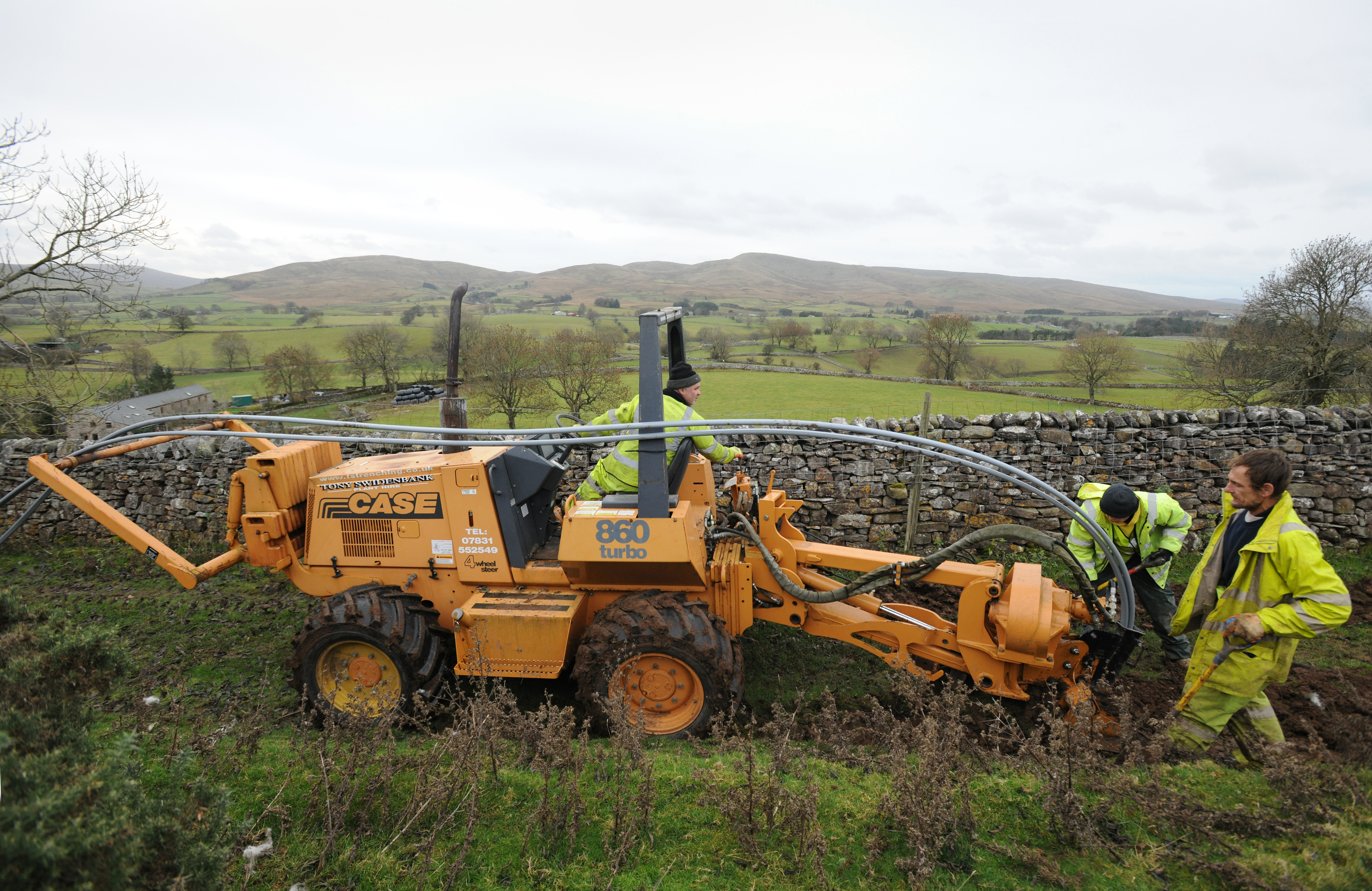
Connecting Cumbria is one of many projects to bring fibre broadband to the North.

Manchester Network Access Point is the only internet exchange point in the UK outside London, and forms the main hub for the region. Household internet access in Northern England is at or above the UK average, but speeds and broadband penetration vary greatly. In 2013, the average speed in central Manchester was 60 Mbit/s, while in nearby Warrington the average speed was only 6.2 Mbit/s. Hull, which is unique in the UK in that its telephone network was never nationalised, has simultaneously some of the fastest and slowest internet speeds in the country: many households have "ultrafast" fibre optic broadband as standard, but it is also one of only two places in the UK where over 30% of businesses receive less than 10 Mbit/s. Speeds are especially poor in the rural parts of the North, with many small towns and villages completely without high speed access. Some areas have therefore formed their own community enterprises, such as Broadband 4 Rural North in Lancashire and Cybermoor in Cumbria, to install high-speed internet connections. Mobile broadband coverage is similarly patchy, with 3G and 4G almost universal in cities but unavailable in large parts of Yorkshire, the North East and Cumbria.

== Media ==
=== Television ===
As part of a drive to reduce media centralisation in London, the BBC and ITV have moved much of their programme production to MediaCityUK in Salford and Channel 4 has moved its headquarters to Leeds. Of the four national evening soap operas, three are set and filmed in Northern England (Coronation Street in Manchester, Emmerdale in the Yorkshire Dales, and Hollyoaks, filmed in Liverpool but set in Chester) and these are important to the local TV industry – the commitment to Emmerdale saved ITV Yorkshire's Leeds Studios from closure. The region also has a reputation for drama serials and has produced some the most successful and acclaimed series of recent decades, including Boys from the Blackstuff, Our Friends in the North, Clocking Off, Shameless, Waterloo Road and Last Tango in Halifax.

=== Newspapers ===
Since The Guardian (formerly The Manchester Guardian) moved to London in 1964, no major national paper is based in the North, and Northern news stories tend to be poorly covered in the national press. The Yorkshire Post promotes itself as "Yorkshire's national paper" and covers some national and international stories, but is primarily focused on news from Yorkshire and the North East. An attempt in 2016 to create a dedicated North-focused national newspaper, 24, failed after six weeks. Across Northern England as a whole, The Sun is the best selling newspaper, but the ongoing boycott around Merseyside following the newspaper's coverage of the 1989 Hillsborough disaster has seen the paper fall behind both the Daily Mail and the Daily Mirror in the North West.

In general national readership in the North drags behind that of the South; the Mirror and the Daily Star are the only national papers with more readers in Northern England than in the South East and London. Local newspapers are the top-selling titles in both the North East and Yorkshire and the Humber, although Northern regional newspapers have seen steep declines in readership in recent years. Only seven daily Northern papers had circulation figures above 25,000 in June 2016: Manchester Evening News, Liverpool Echo, Hull Daily Mail, Newcastle Chronicle, The Yorkshire Post and The Northern Echo.

== Culture and identity ==
Steel-built landmarks of the North

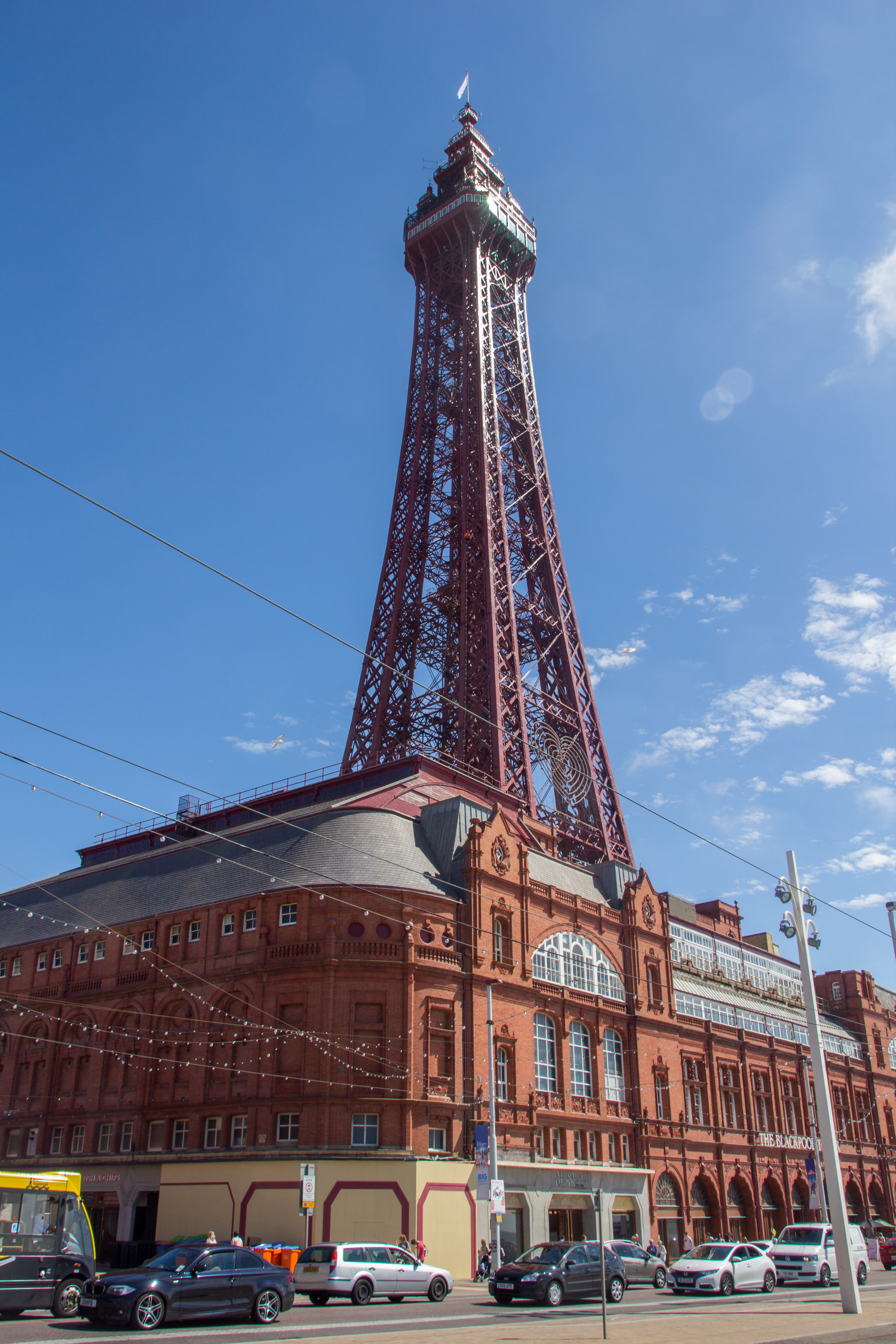
Blackpool Tower

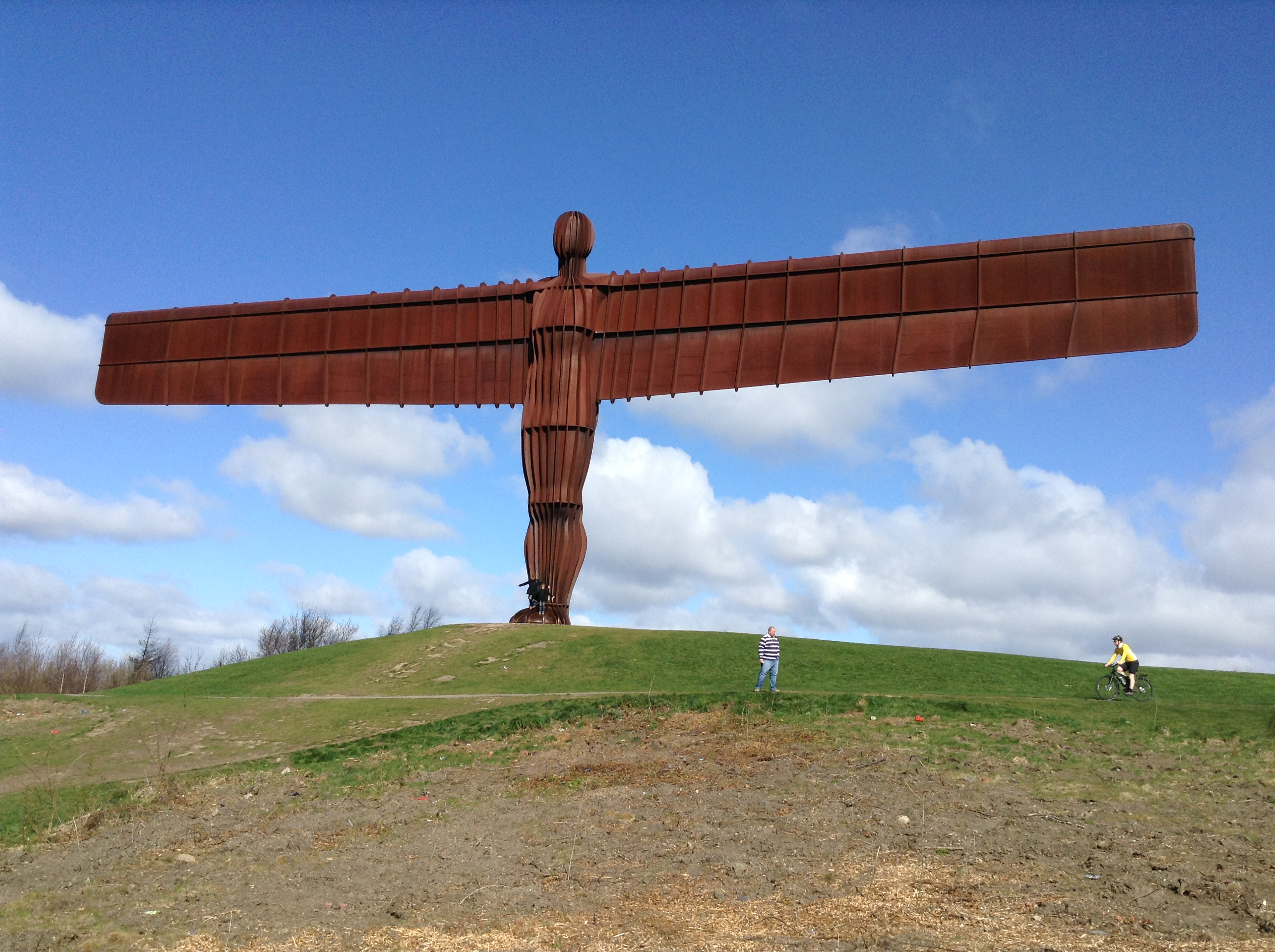
Angel of the North

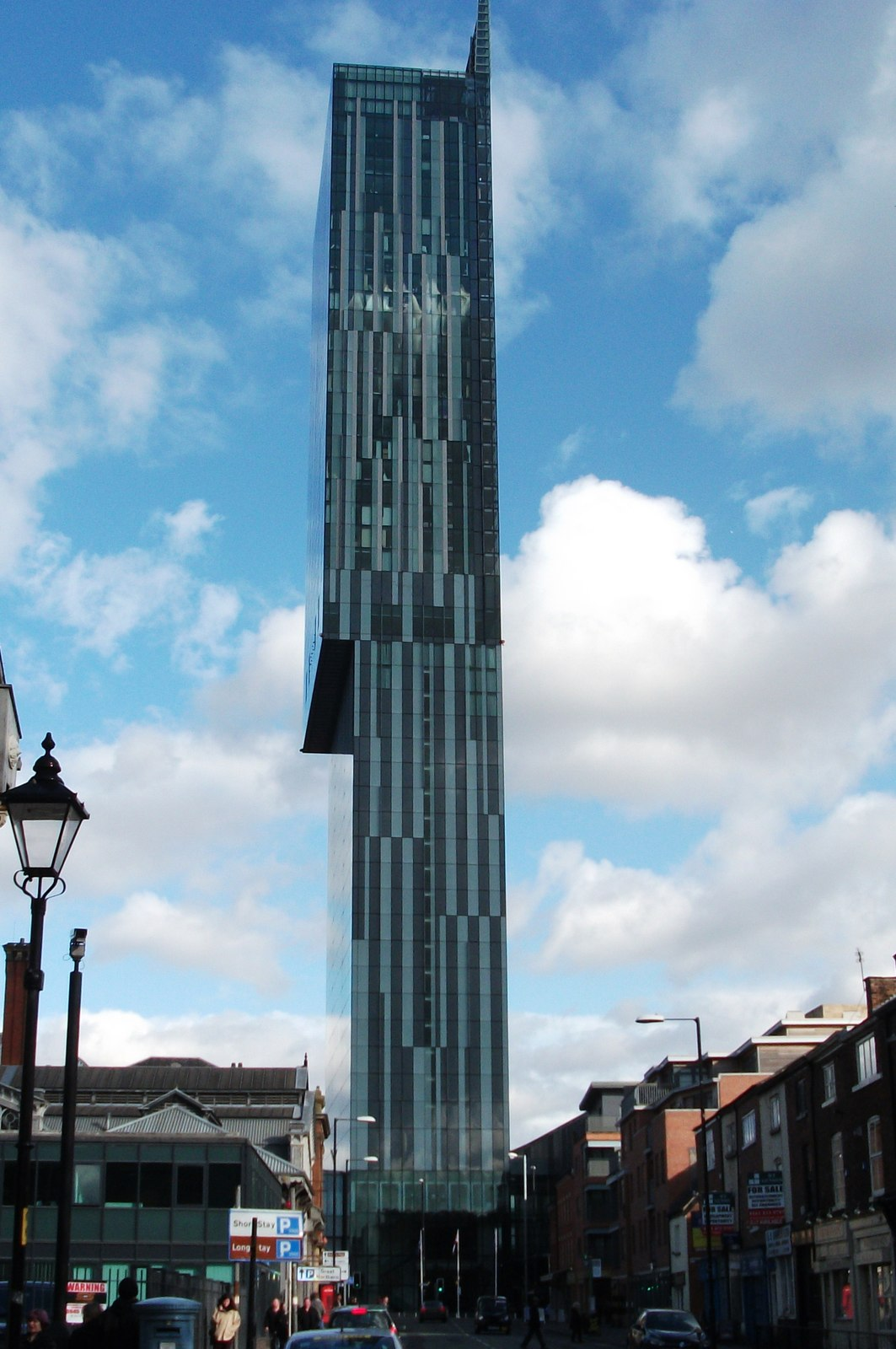
Manchester Beetham Tower

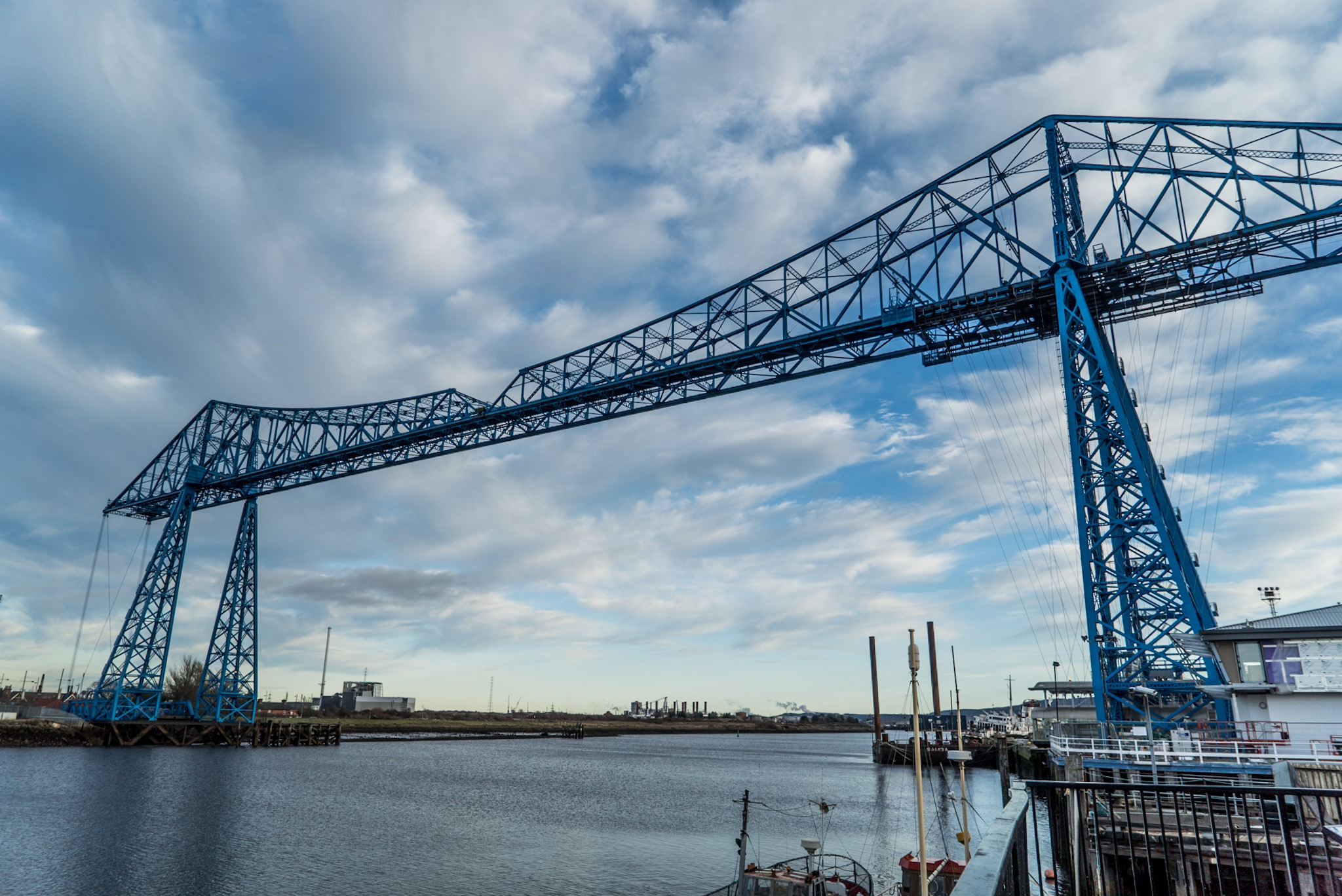
Middlesbrough Transporter Bridge

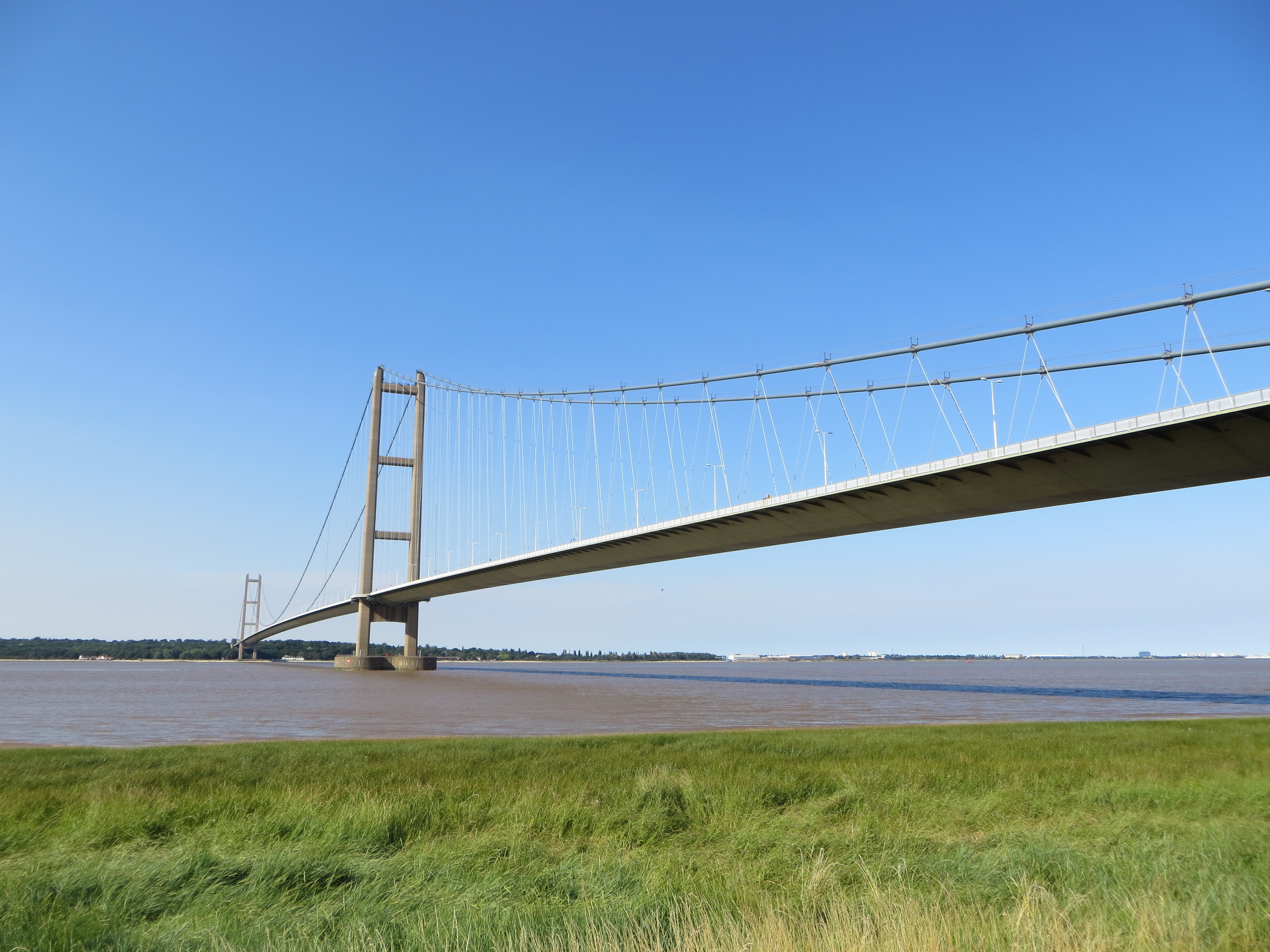
Humber Bridge

The individual regions of the North have had their own identities and cultures for centuries, but with industrialisation, mass media and the opening of the North–South divide, a common Northern identity began to develop. This identity was initially a reactionary response to Southern prejudices—the North of the nineteenth century was largely depicted as a dirty, wild and uncultured place, even in sympathetic depictions such as Elizabeth Gaskell's 1855 novel North and South—but became an affirmation of what Northerners saw as their own personal strengths.

Traits stereotypically associated with Northern England are straight-talking, grit and warmheartedness, as compared to the supposedly effete Southerners. Northern England—especially Lancashire, but also Yorkshire and the North East—has a tradition of matriarchal families, where the woman of the house runs the home and controls the family's finances. This too has its roots in industrialisation, when mills offered well-paid work for women: during depressions when demand for coal and steel were low, women were often the main breadwinners. Northern women are still stereotyped as strong-willed and independent, or affectionately as battle-axes.

=== "It's grim up north" ===
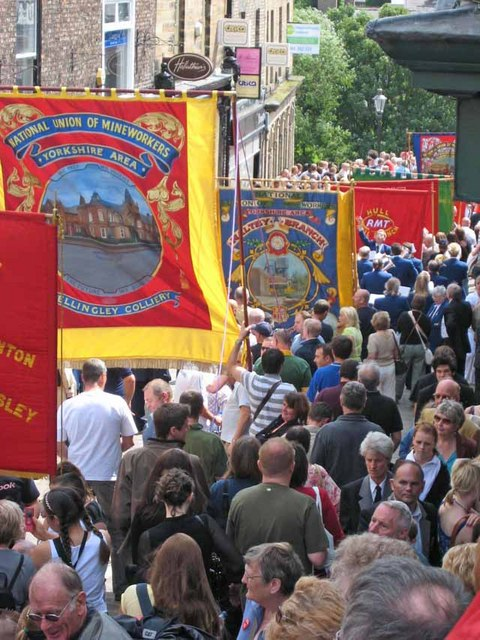
The Durham Miners' Gala is one of the largest trade union events in Europe.

The phrase it's grim up north is associated with coal mining, industrial mills, weather and the way of life in the north of England during the Victorian and post World War I eras, when mills, coal mining, child labour and slums were common. The phrase is often used by those who are not from the north of England, who paint the north as being different to the south of England. Prime Minister Andy Burnham has quoted the north as being grim, but not a bad thing. The phrase was quoted in 1991 when the band The Justified Ancients of Mu Mu a.k.a. The KLF used it in relation to places in the north of England including Cheshire, Greater Manchester, Lancashire, Merseyside, Yorkshire and Cumbria and they use the phrase repeatedly in their song of the same name.

=== Clothing ===
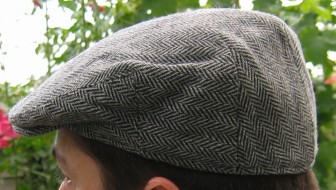
The flat cap stereotypically associated with Northern England

The North of England is often stereotypically represented through the clothing worn by working-class men and women in the nineteenth and early twentieth centuries. Working men would wear a heavy jacket and trousers held up by braces, an overcoat, and a hat, typically a flat cap, while women would wear a dress, or a skirt and blouse, with an apron on top as protection from dirt; in colder months they would often wear a shawl or headscarf. The maud, a woollen plaid woven in a pattern of small black and white checks, was also popular in Northern England until the early twentieth century.

If not wearing leather lace-up shoes, some men and women would have worn English clogs, which were hardwearing and had replaceable soles and tips. Factory workers tapping their feet in time with the click of machinery developed a type of folk clog dance referred to as clogging, which was intricately developed in the North.

In the second half of the twentieth century, these traditional clothes fell out of fashion. Other styles such as "casual clobber" (mainland European designer clothing brought back by touring football fans) and sportswear became more popular, and the influence of Northern bands and football teams helped spread them across the country. In the twenty-first century, some traditional Northern items of clothing have begun to make a comeback – in particular, the flat cap.

=== Cuisine ===
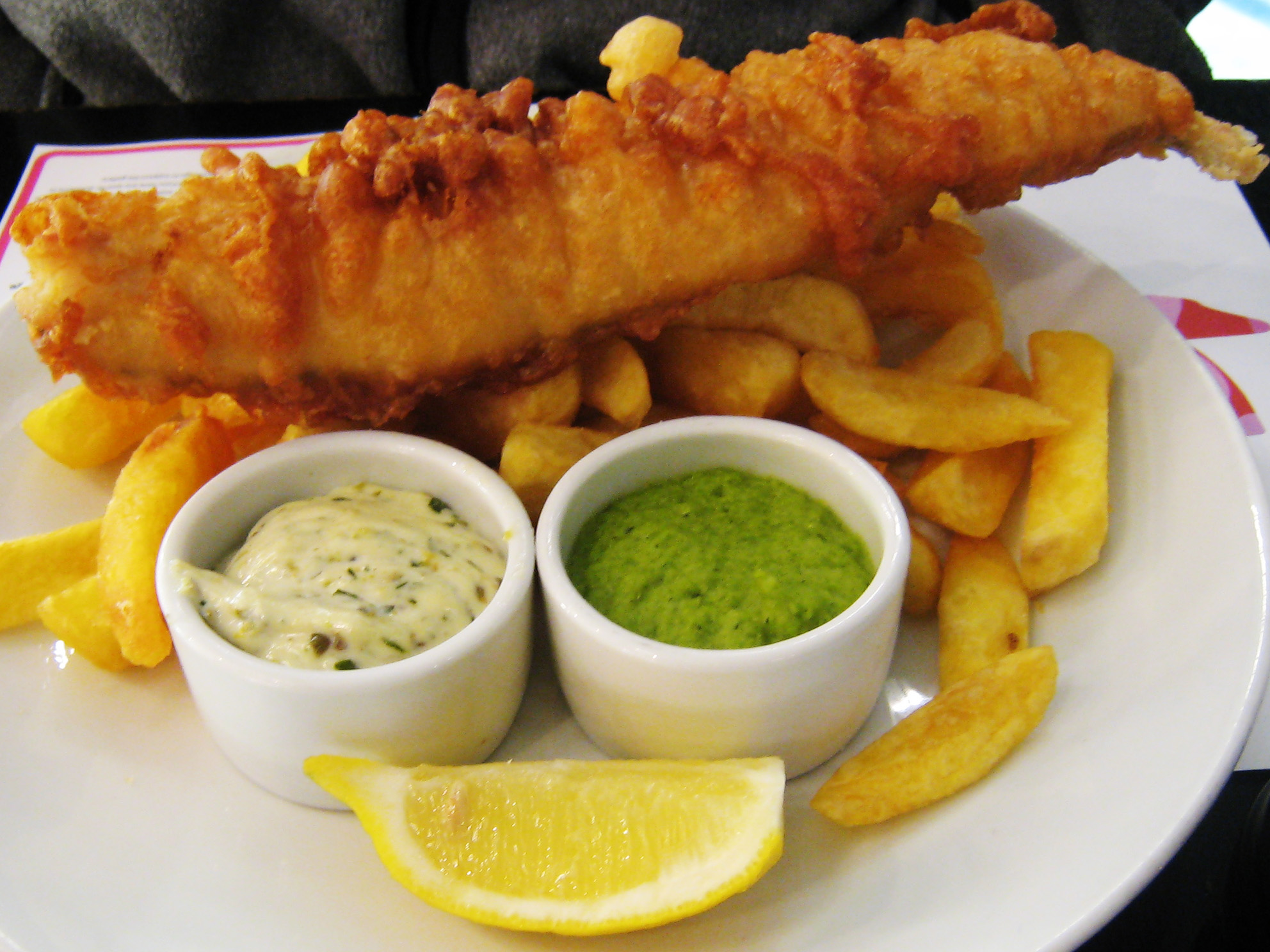
Fish and chips with mushy peas

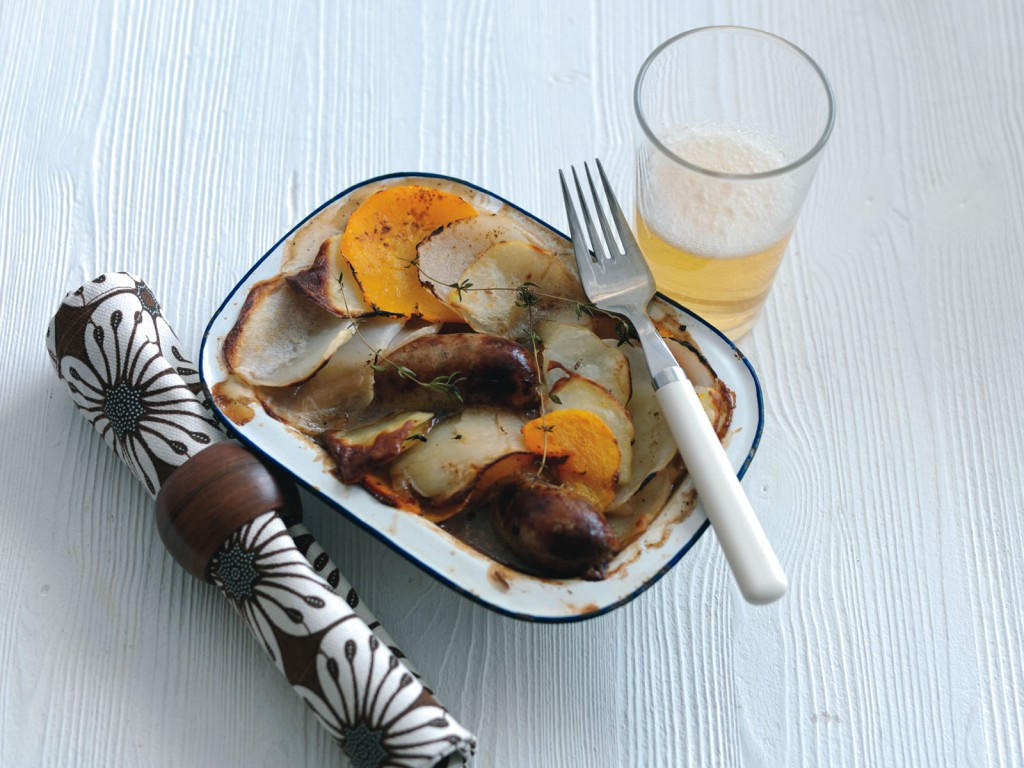
Lancashire hotpot

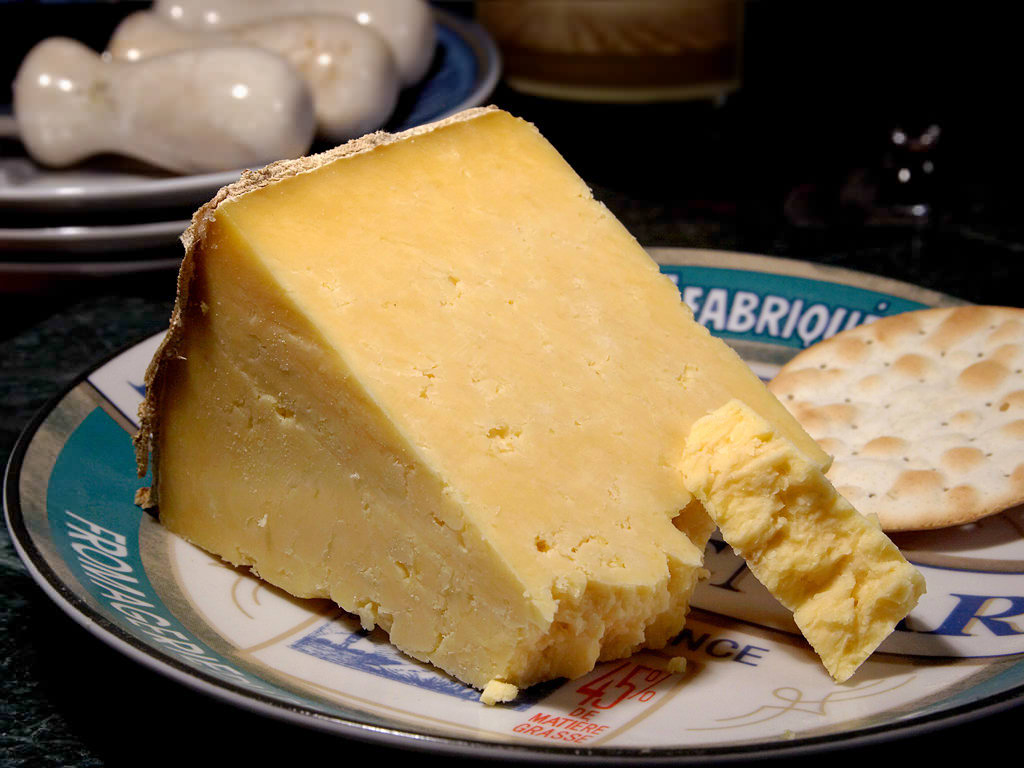
Cheshire cheese

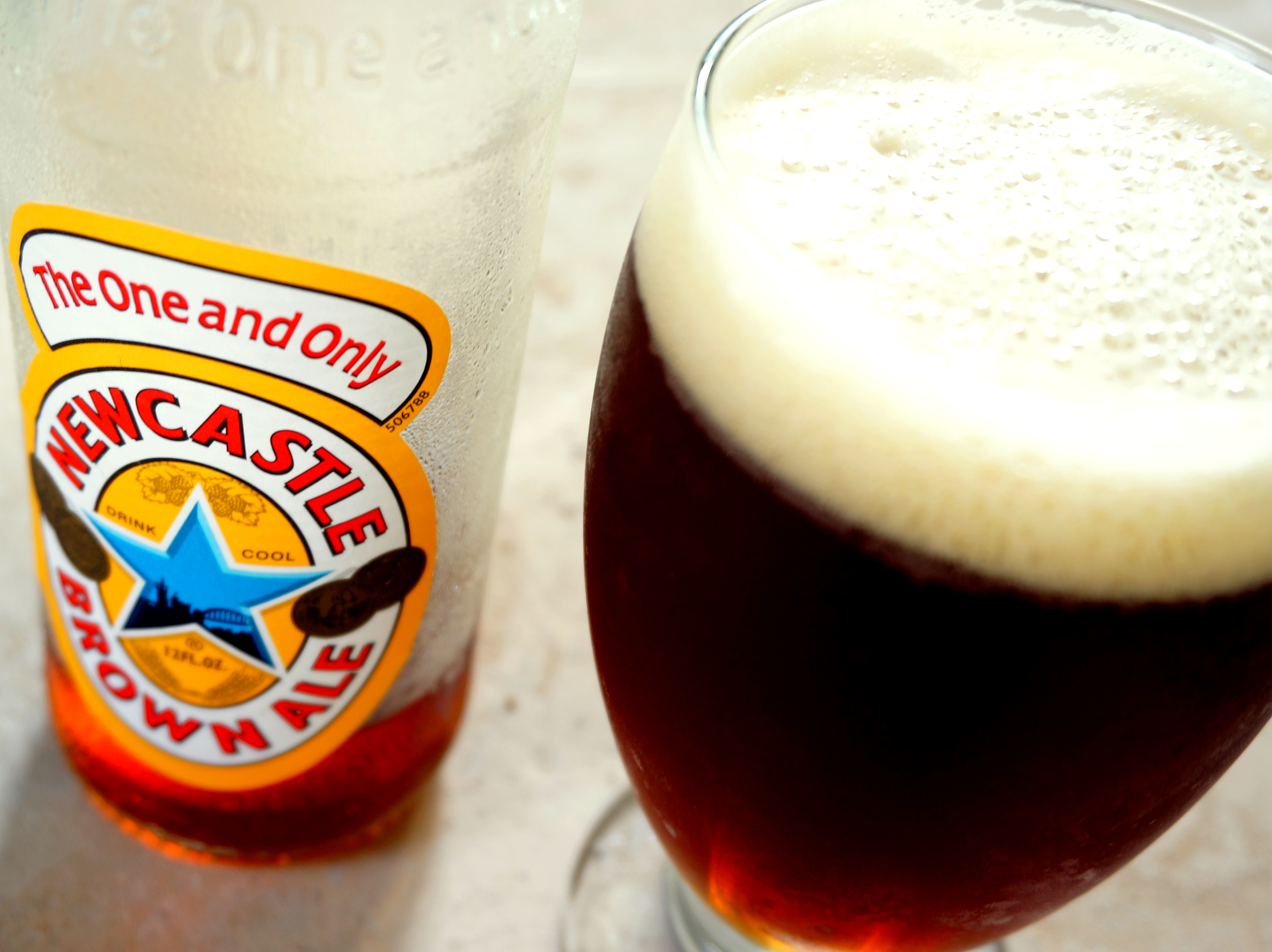
Newcastle Brown Ale

Impressions of Northern English cuisine are still shaped by the working-class diet of the early twentieth century, which was heavy on offal, high in calories and often not particularly healthy. Dishes such as black pudding, tripe, mushy peas and meat pie remain stereotypical Northern English foods in the national imagination. As a result, there is a concerted effort among Northern chefs to improve the region's image. Some Northern dishes such as Yorkshire pudding and Lancashire hotpot have spread across the UK, and only their names now hint at their origin. Among the Northern delicacies that have achieved Protected Geographical Status are traditional Cumberland sausage, traditional Grimsby smoked fish, Swaledale cheese, Yorkshire forced rhubarb and Yorkshire Wensleydale. (Note: Newcastle Brown Ale formerly had protected status – this was cancelled in 2007 to allow the brewery to move outside Newcastle.)

The North is known for its often crumbly cheeses, of which Cheshire cheese is the earliest example. Unlike Southern cheeses like Cheddar, Northern cheeses typically use uncooked milk and a pre-salted curd pressed under enormous weights, resulting in a moist, sharp-tasting cheese. Wensleydale, another crumbly cheese, is unusual in that it is often served as a side to sweet cakes, which are themselves well represented in Northern England. Parkin, an oatmeal cake with black treacle and ginger, is a traditional treat across the North on Bonfire Night, and the fruity scone-like singing hinny and fat rascal are popular in the North East and Yorkshire respectively.

While a variety of beers are popular across Northern England, the region is especially associated with brown ales such as Newcastle Brown Ale, Double Maxim and Samuel Smith Old Brewery's Nut Brown Ale. Beer in the North is usually served with a thick head which accentuates the nutty, malty flavours preferred in Northern beers. On the non-alcoholic side, the North – in particular, Lancashire – was the hub of the temperance bar movement which popularised soft drinks such as dandelion and burdock, Tizer and Vimto.

According to The Tab, the bakery chain Greggs is an integral part of Northern identity, using the number of people per Greggs as an indicator as to whether a town should be considered Northern.

Immigration to Northern England has shaped its cuisine. The Teesside parmo is one example, derived from escalope Parmesan brought to the area by an Italian-American immigrant and adapted to the region's taste. There are large Chinatowns in Liverpool, Manchester and Newcastle, and communities from the Indian subcontinent in all major towns. Bradford has won the Federation of Specialist Restaurant's "Curry Capital" title six years in a row as of 2016, while the Curry Mile in Manchester formerly had the largest concentration of curry restaurants in the UK and now offers a wide range of South Asian and Middle Eastern cuisine.

=== Music ===
"Scarborough Fair", a traditional Northern folk song

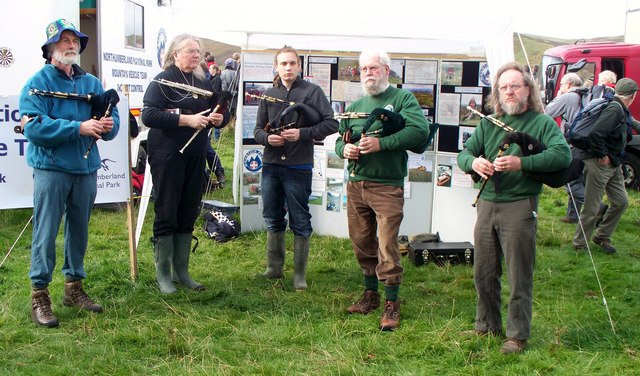
Northumbrian pipers at Alwinton Border Shepherds Show

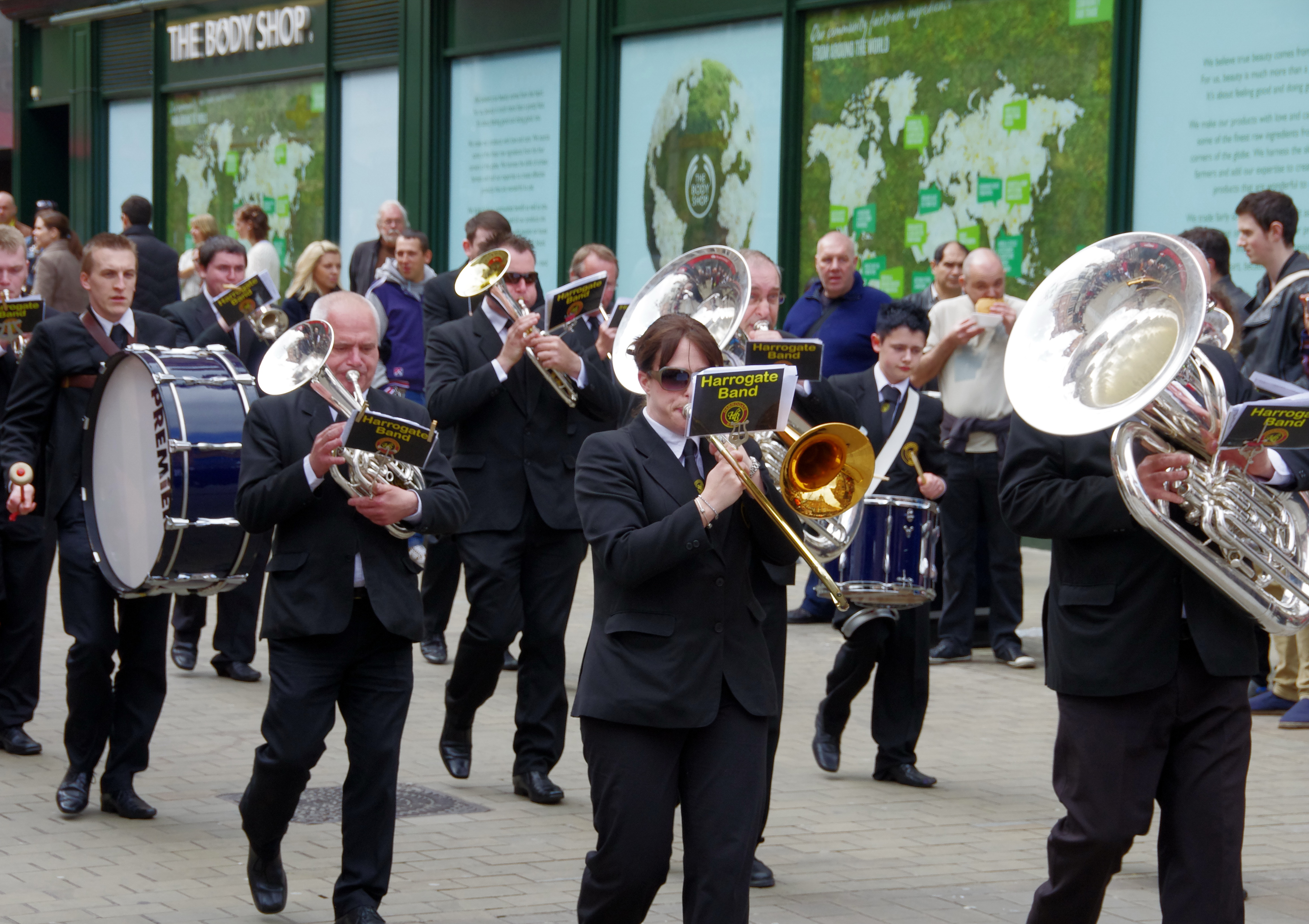
The Harrogate Band playing in Leeds

Traditional folk music in Northern England is a combination of styles of England and Scotland – what is now called the Anglo-Scottish border ballad was once prevalent as far south as Lancashire. In the early modern period, much of Northern folk was accompanied by bagpipes, with styles including the Pastoral pipes, Lancashire bagpipe, Yorkshire bagpipe and Northumbrian smallpipes. These disappeared in the early nineteenth century from the industrialising south of the region, but remain in the music of Northumbria.

The British brass band tradition began in Northern England at around the same time: the dismissal of the Cheshire, Lancashire and Yorkshire military bands after the Napoleonic Wars, combined with the desire of industrial communities to better themselves, led to the founding of civilian bands. These bands provided entertainment at community events and led protest marches during the era of radical agitation. Although the style has since spread across much of Great Britain, brass bands remain a stereotype of the North, and the Whit Friday brass band contests draw hundreds of bands from across the UK and further afield.

Northern England also has a thriving popular music scene. Influential movements include Merseybeat from the Liverpool area, which produced The Beatles, Northern soul, which brought Motown to England, and Madchester, the precursor to the rave scene. Across the Pennines, Sheffield is the birthplace of influential electronic pop bands from Cabaret Voltaire to Pulp, the New Yorkshire indie rock movement of the 2000s gave the country the Kaiser Chiefs and the Arctic Monkeys, and Teesside has a rock scene stretching from Chris Rea to Maxïmo Park. The press frequently frames music stories and reviews in terms of cultural and class differences between North and South, notably in the 1960s rivalry between the Beatles and the Rolling Stones and the 1990s Battle of Britpop between Oasis and Blur.

== Sport ==
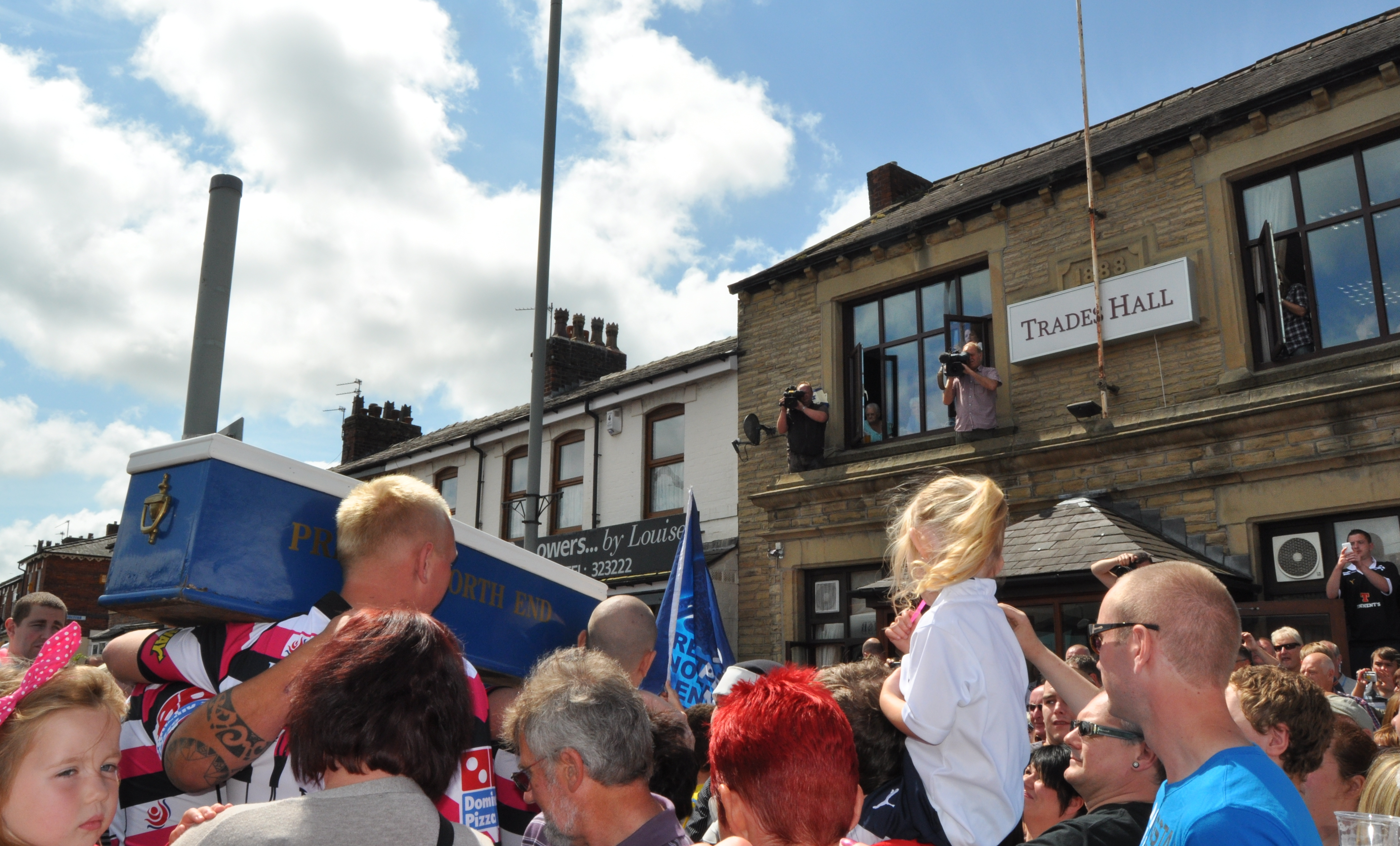
Preston North End fans "mourn" relegation with the long-running Burial of the Coffin ceremony.

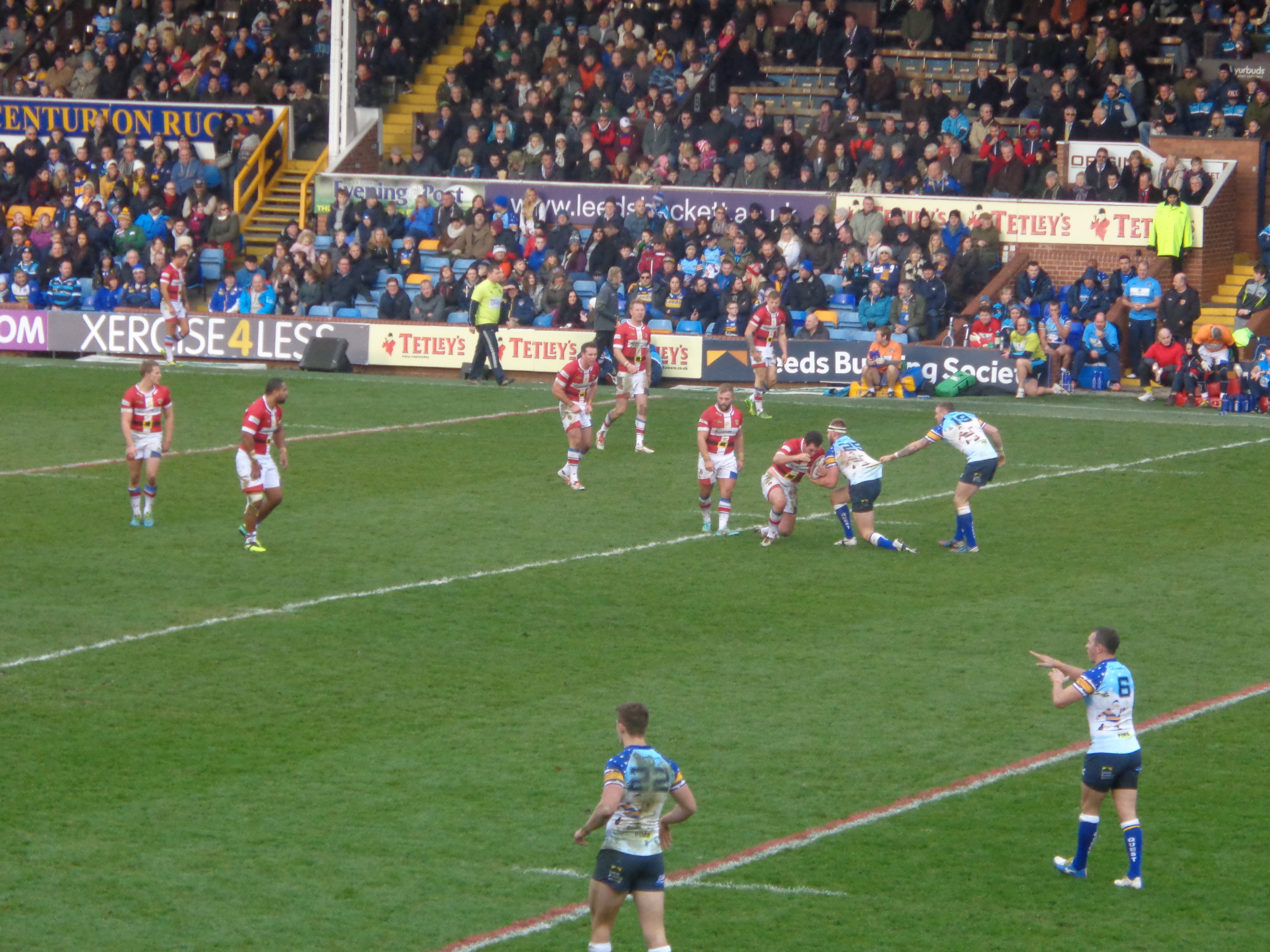
Every Boxing Day, Leeds Rhinos host Wakefield Trinity for a local derby.

Sport has been both one of the most unifying cultural forces in Northern England and, thanks to local rivalries such as the Lancashire–Yorkshire Roses rivalry, one of the most divisive. As huge numbers of people moved into recently built cities with little cultural heritage, local sports teams offered the population a sense of place and identity that was otherwise absent.

Many early Northern sports players were working class and needed to miss work to play, with their teams compensating them for lost wages. By contrast, Southern teams, drawing from the traditions of public schools and Oxbridge, put great emphasis on amateurism and the Southern-dominated governing bodies forbade payments to players. This tension shaped the sports of association football and cricket, and led to the schism between the two main forms of rugby. The North is also associated with the animal sports of dog racing with whippets, pigeon racing and ferret legging, although these are now far more popular in stereotype than in reality.

Manchester hosted the 2002 Commonwealth Games, which left it a legacy of sporting facilities including the City of Manchester Stadium, Manchester Aquatics Centre and the National Cycling Centre, headquarters of British Cycling. The Grand Départ for the 2014 Tour de France was in Leeds, and every year since Yorkshire has hosted the Tour de Yorkshire cycling event, part of the UCI Europe Tour. Tyneside meanwhile hosts the Great North Run, the UK's biggest mass-participation sporting event and the most popular half marathon in the world.

=== Association football ===
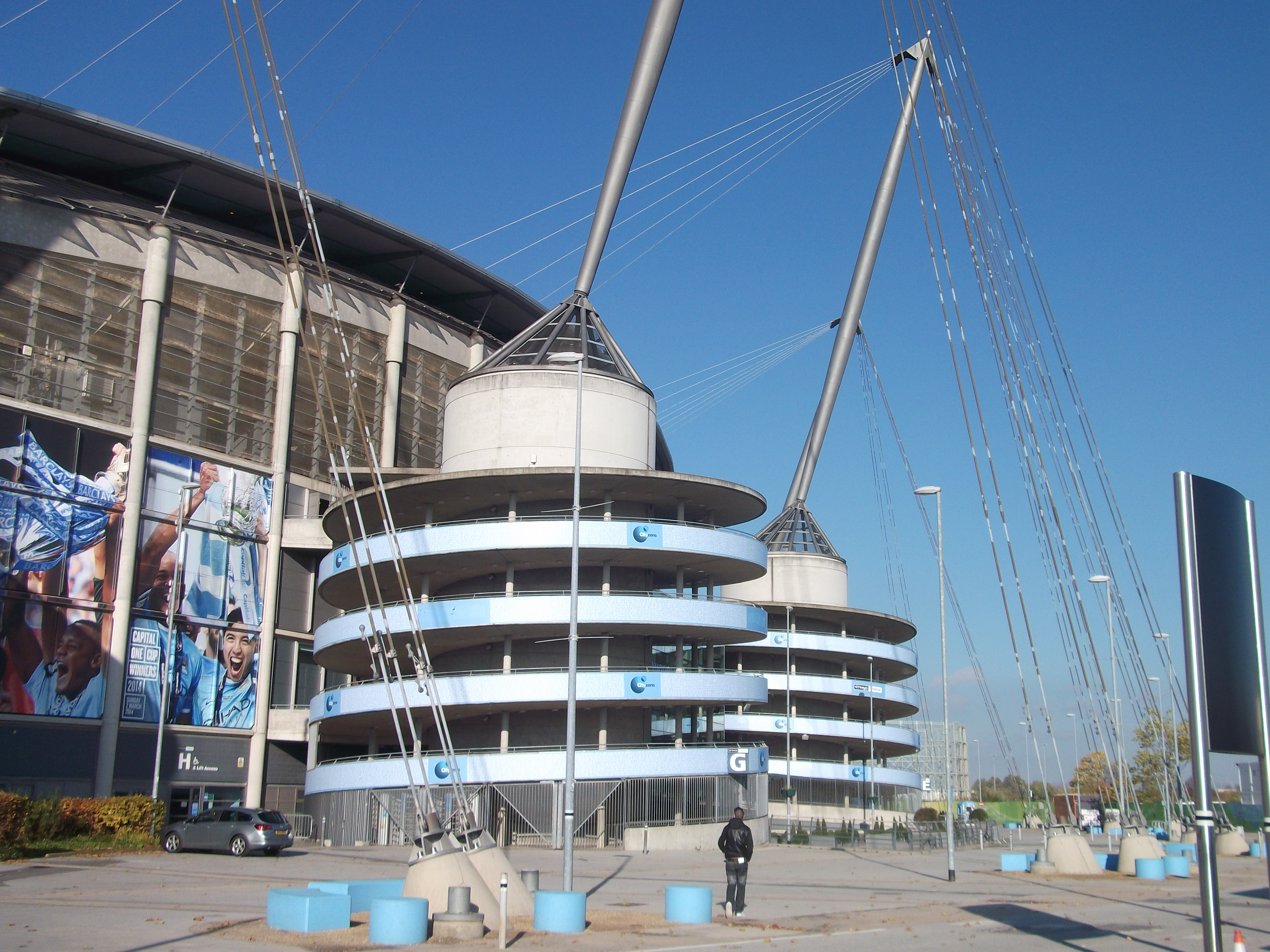
Manchester City's Stadium

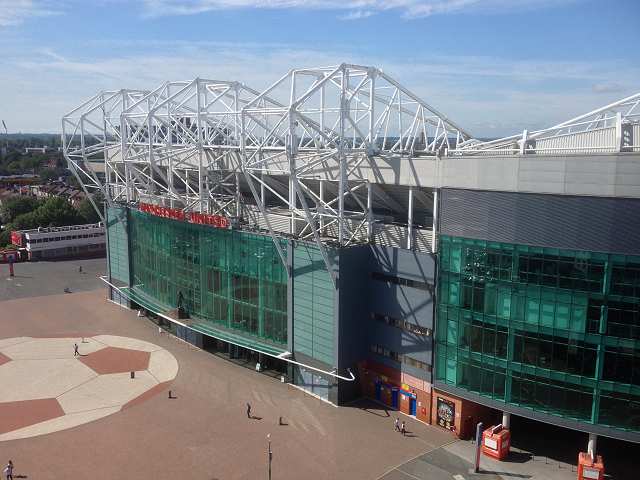
Manchester United's Old Trafford Stadium

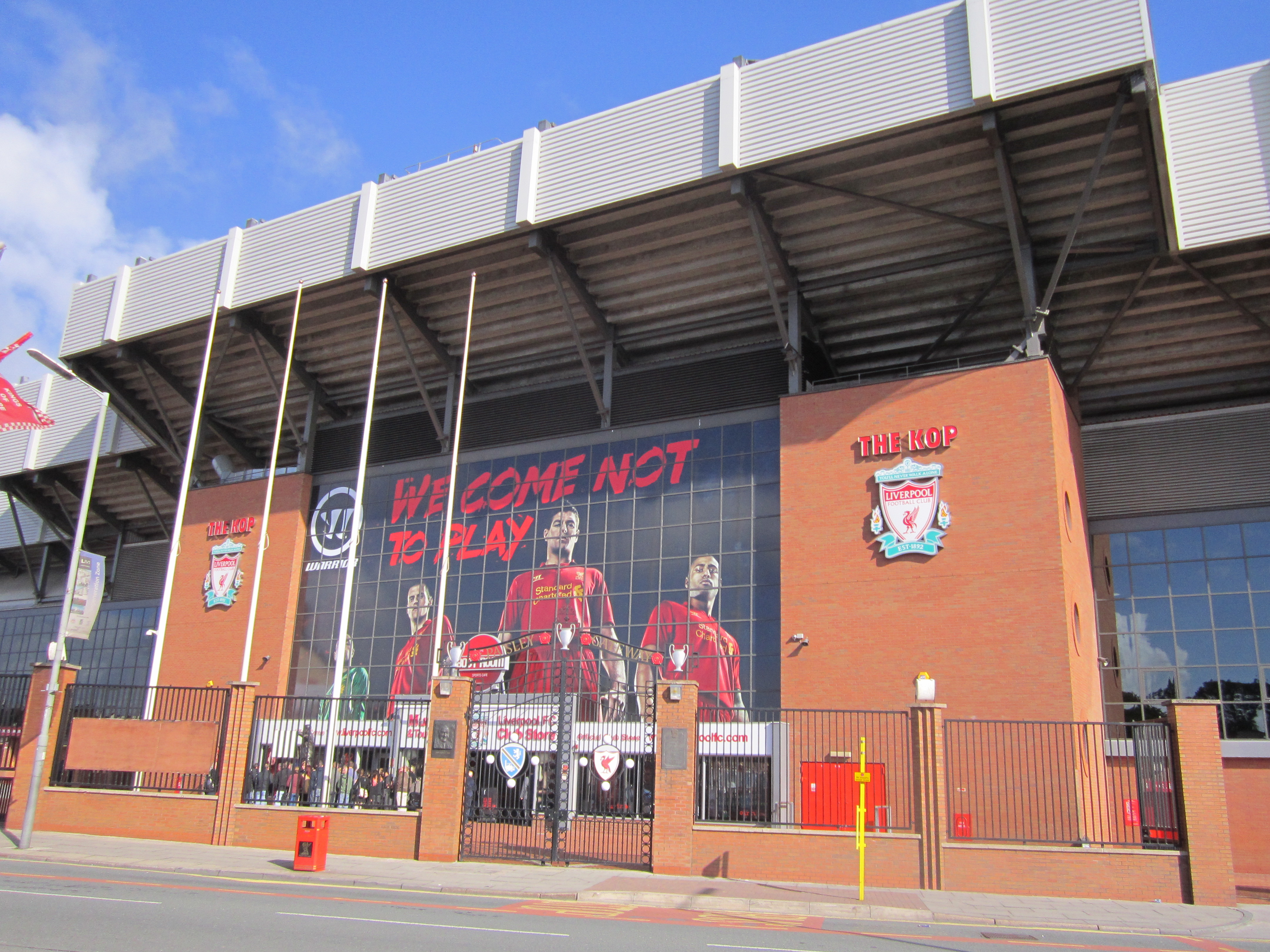
Liverpool FC's Anfield Stadium

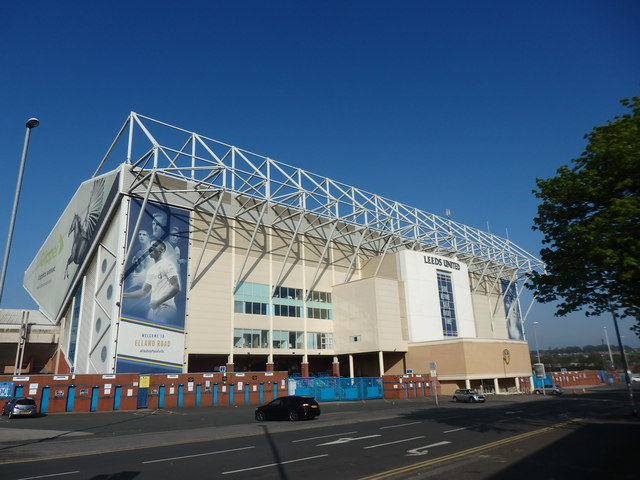
Leeds United's Elland Road

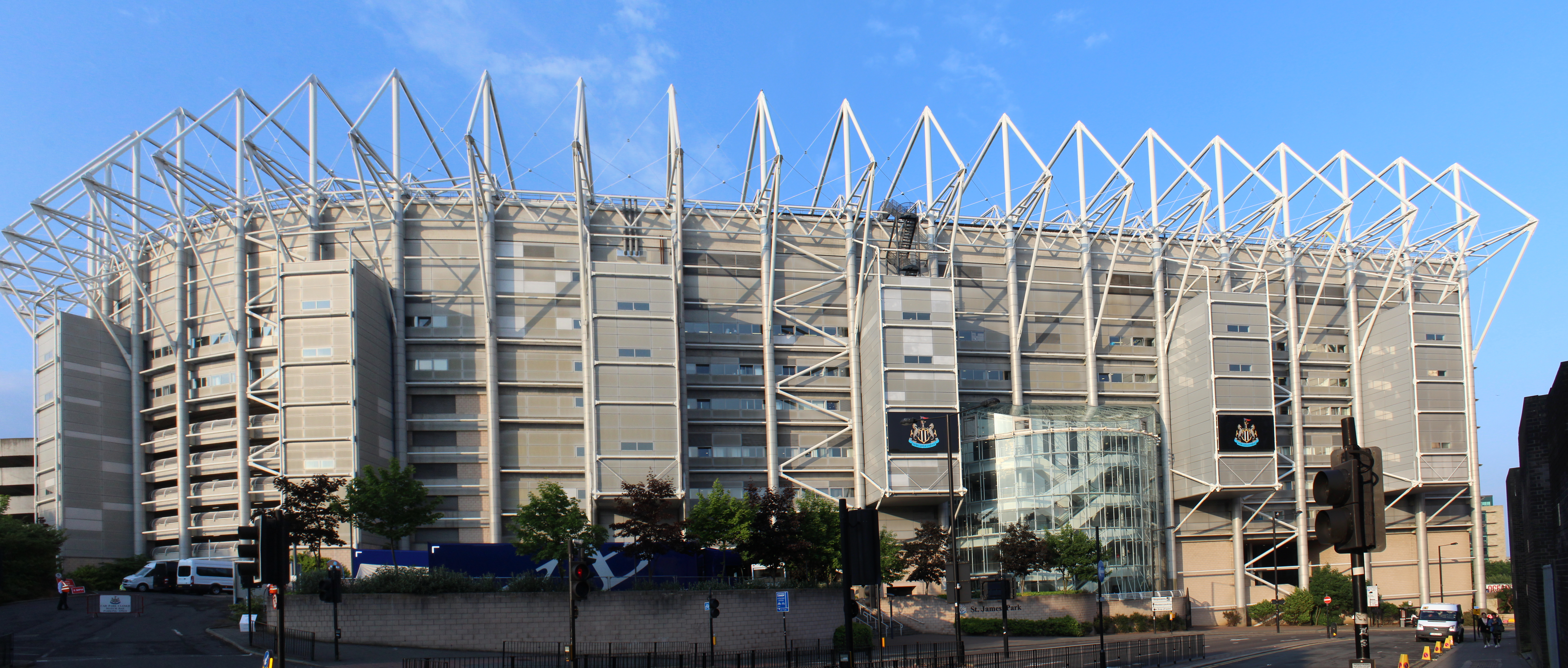
Newcastle United's St James' Park

The first football club in the UK was Sheffield F.C., founded in 1857. Early Northern football teams tended to adopt the Sheffield Rules rather than the Football Association Rules, but the two codes were merged in 1877. Many of the innovations of Sheffield Rules are now part of the global game, including corners, throw-ins, and free kicks for fouls.

In 1883 Blackburn Olympic, a team composed mainly of factory workers, became the first Northern team to win the FA Cup, and the next year Preston North End won an FA Cup match against London-based Upton Park. Upton Park protested that Preston had broken FA rules by paying their players. In response, Preston withdrew from the competition and fellow Lancashire clubs Burnley and Great Lever followed suit. The protest gathered momentum to the point where more than 30 clubs, predominantly from the North, announced that they would set up a rival British Football Association if the FA did not permit professionalism. A schism was avoided in July 1885 when professionalism was formally legalised in English football. The Football League was founded in 1888, and marked its independence from the London-based Football Association (FA) by establishing headquarters in Preston – the League retained a Northern identity even after it accepted several Southern teams into its ranks.

Organised women's football followed as the workforces of majority-female factories of Northern England in the First World War entered the 1917–18 Tyne, Wear & Tees Munition Girls Cup – the world's first women's football tournament. However, the FA did not support women's football and banned it altogether in 1921. Intense local derbies between neighbouring teams mean that there is less of a North–South rivalry than in some other sports.

Many of the powerhouses of English football came from the North – as of the 2024–25 season, of the 127 top-flight league titles since 1888, 87 (69%) have been won by teams based north of Crewe. Everton, Liverpool, Manchester United and Manchester City are among the mainstays of the Premier League, while teams like Blackburn Rovers, Middlesbrough, Newcastle United and Sunderland have had more inconsistent runs in recent years, regularly being promoted and relegated from the top flight.

Northern England is also the birthplace of the largest proportion the country's top players – as of Euro 2016, 537 Northerners had played for the England team, compared to 266 Midlanders and 367 Southerners, and 15 of the 23 man squad for the 2018 World Cup, as well as 14 of the 2019 Women's World Cup squad, were born in the region.

=== Rugby football ===
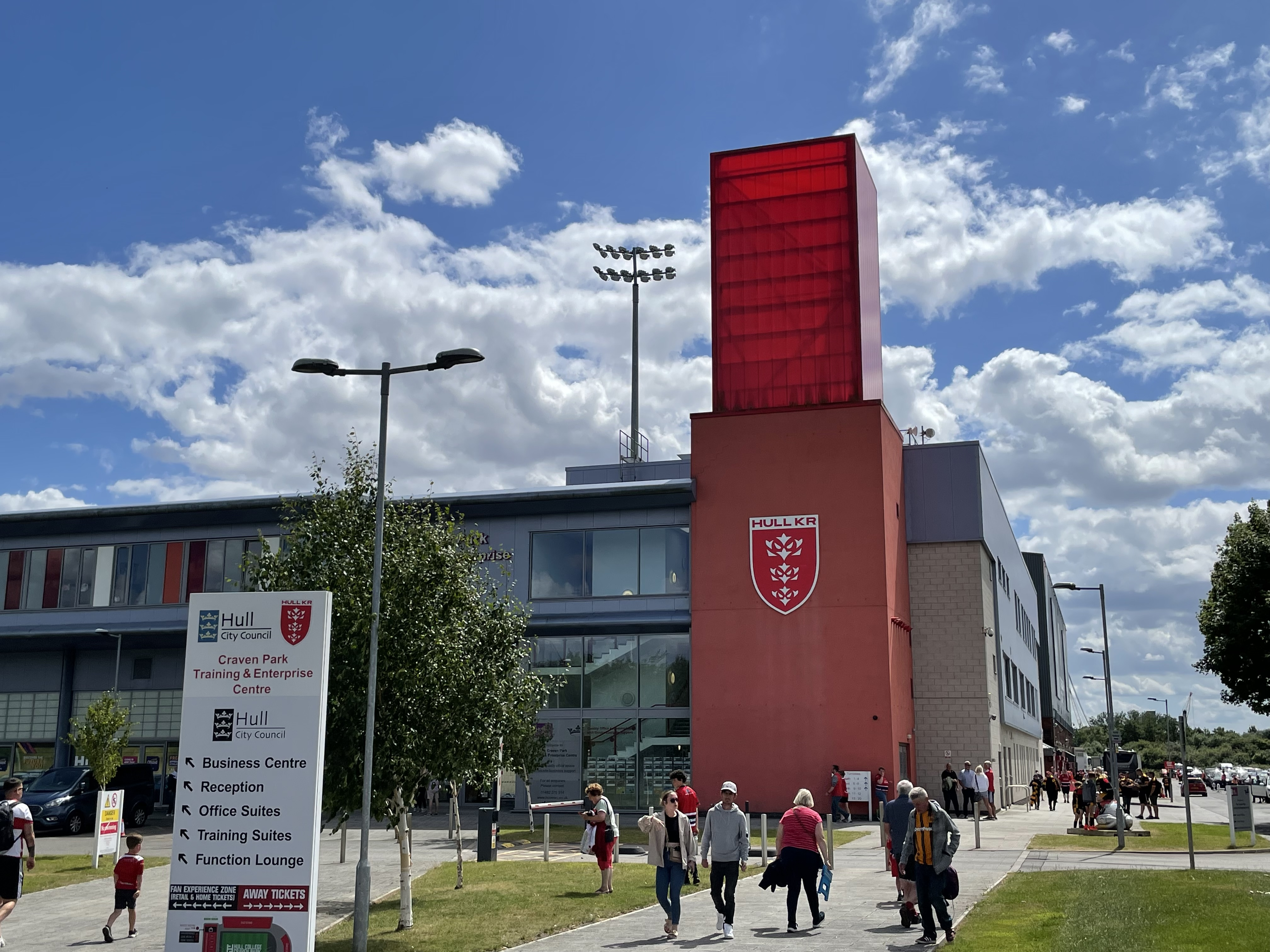
Hull KR's Craven Park

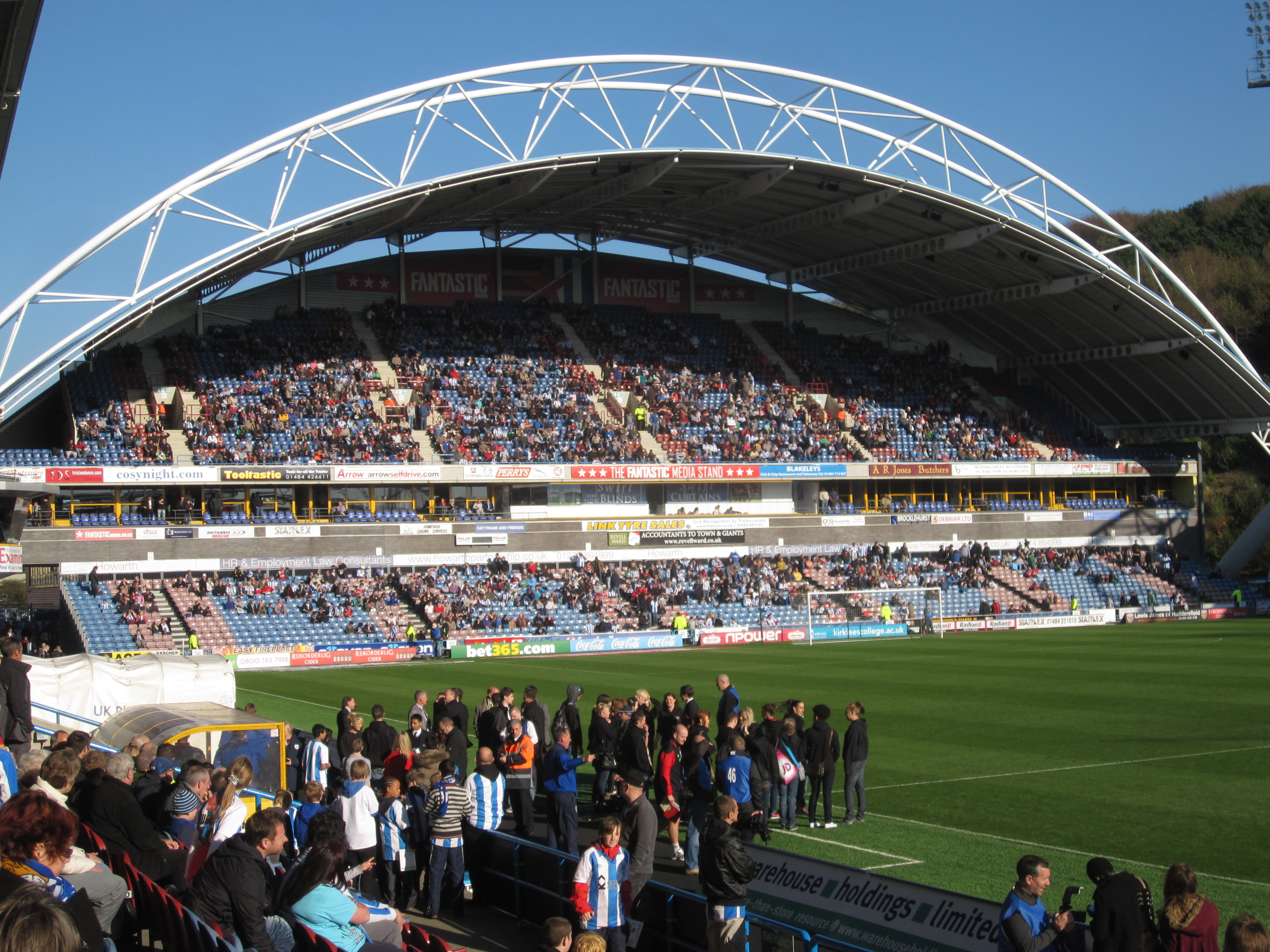
Huddersfield Giants's Kirklees Stadium

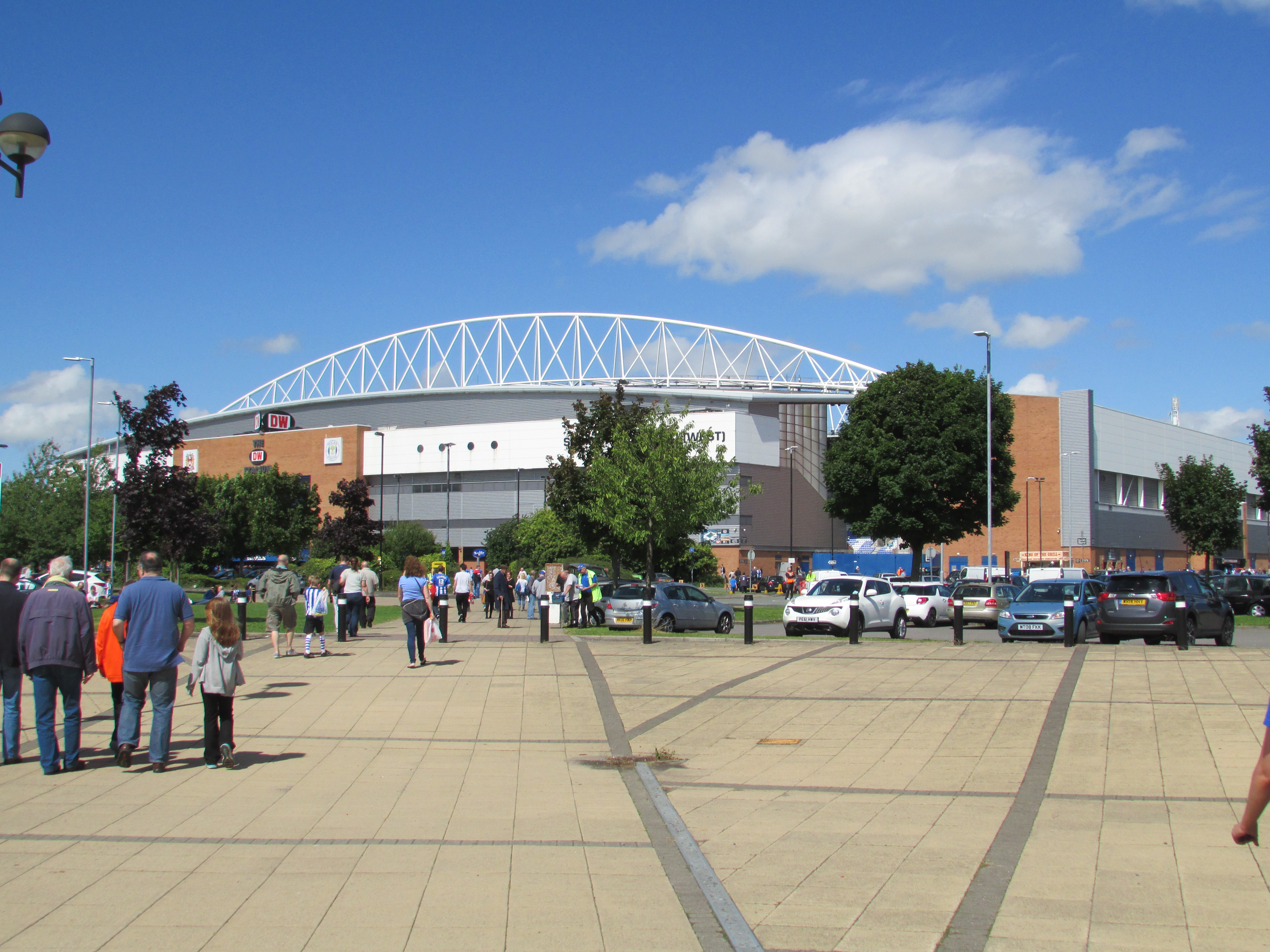
Wigan Warriors's Stadium

Rugby league culturally dominates rugby union in this part of the world, as exhibited by the fact that the largest sporting crowd ever in northern England was the 1954 rugby league Challenge Cup Final at Bradford, which hosted in excess of 120,000 spectators.

The Rugby Football Union (RFU), which enforced amateurism, suspended teams who compensated their players for missed work and injury, leading teams from Lancashire, Yorkshire and surrounding areas to split away in 1895 and form the Rugby Football League (RFL). Over time, the RFU and RFL adopted different rules and the two forms of the game – rugby union and rugby league – diverged. Rugby league's stronghold remains Northern England along the "M62 corridor" between Liverpool and Hull. As of the 2025 season, 11 of the 12 teams in the Super League (the highest level of rugby league in the Northern Hemisphere) are from Northern England, with one team from France, and the 14-team Championship below it has 12 Northern teams, one London team and 1 French team.

Rugby union was not entirely driven from Northern England, and in the 1970s the region was home to several strong teams. The high-water mark of rugby union in Northern England was the 1979 New Zealand tour during which the English Northern Division was the only team to defeat the All Blacks. In the 21st century the region's club sides have become less popular, with association football, cricket and rugby league attracting more spectators and talent. In the 2024–25 season, Sale Sharks and Newcastle Falcons play in the English Premiership, and Caldy RFC and Doncaster Knights play in the RFU Championship.

=== Cricket ===
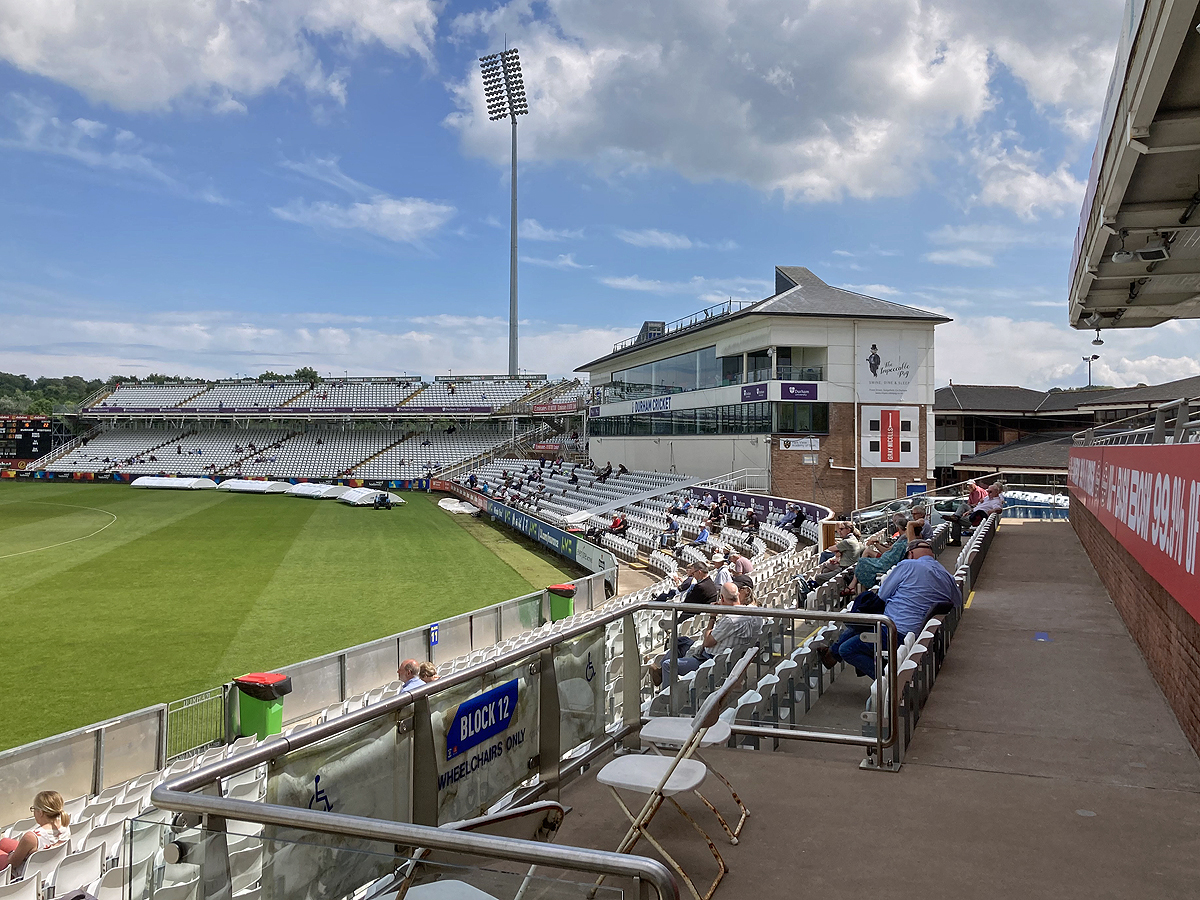
Durham CCC's Riverside Ground

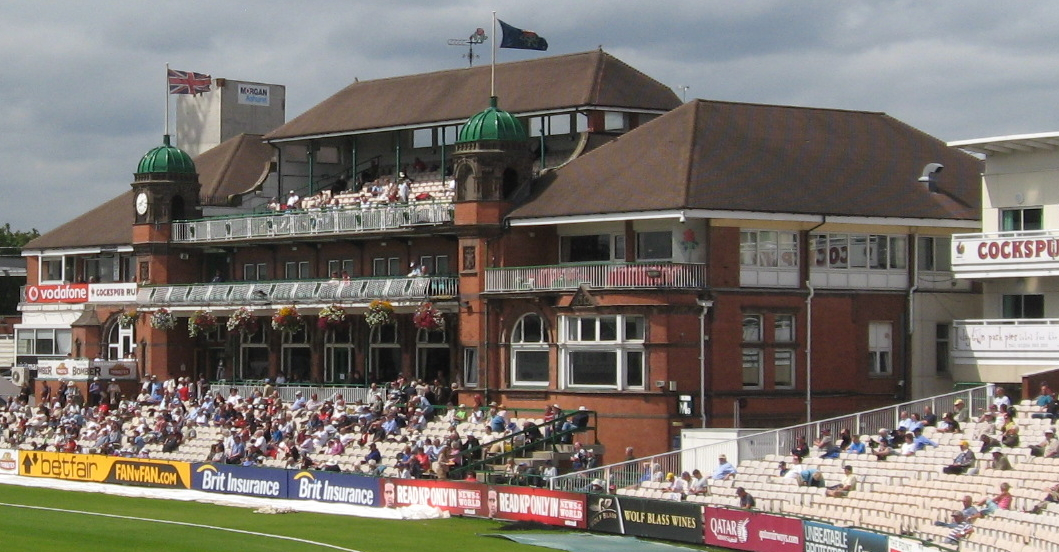
Lancashire CCC's Old Trafford Cricket Ground

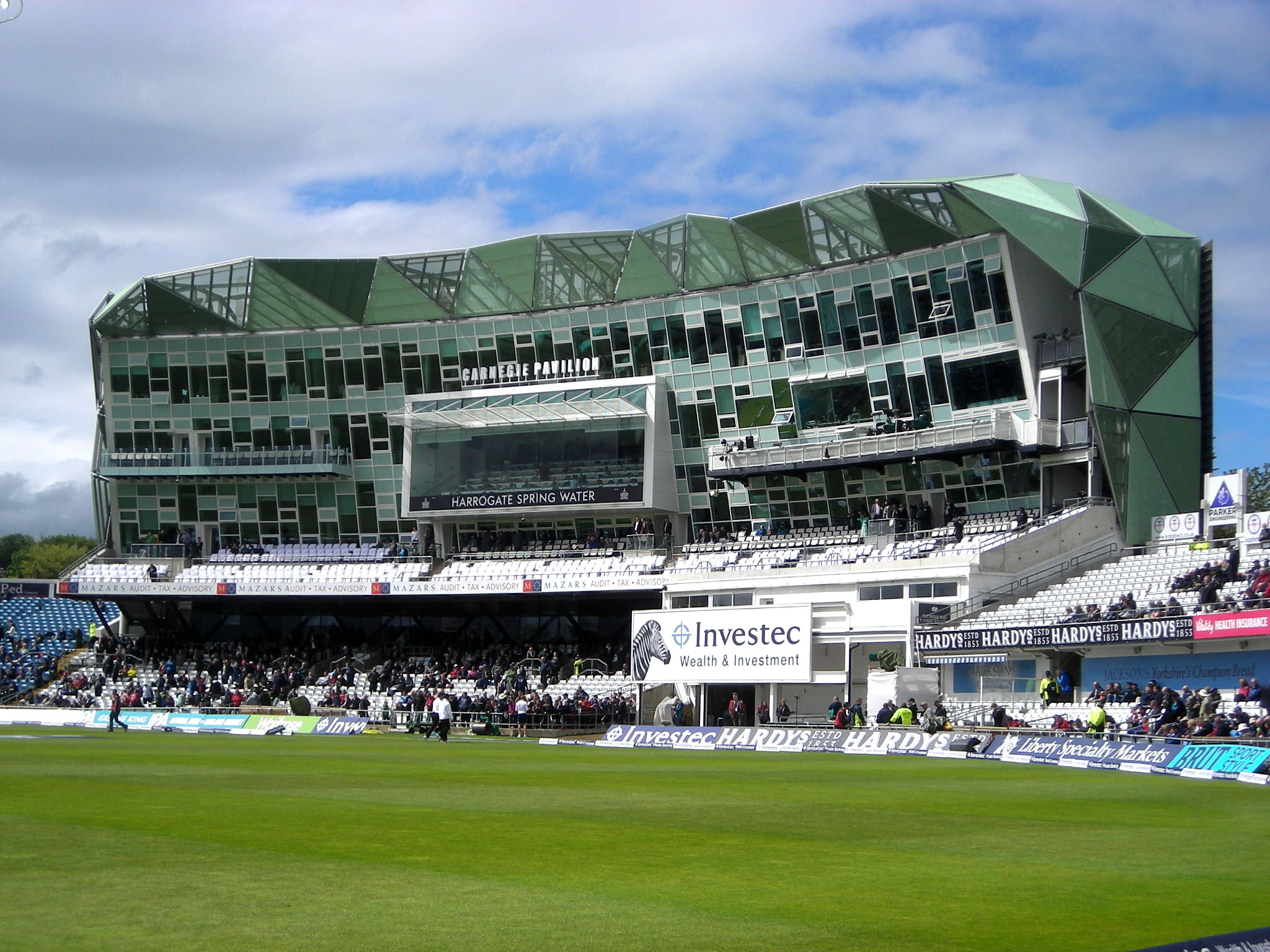
Yorkshire CCC's Headingley Stadium

Cricket has a strong following in Northern England, and three counties are represented by first-class county cricket teams: Durham, Lancashire and Yorkshire. The Roses Match (named for the Red Rose of Lancaster and the White Rose of York) between Lancashire and Yorkshire is one of the hardest fought rivalries in the sport – the pride of both sides, and their determination not to lose, resulted in the teams developing a slow, stubborn and defensive style that proved unpopular elsewhere in the country. The London-based Marylebone Cricket Club, which controlled the game at the time, selected few Northern players for Test matches, and this was perceived as a snub to their playing style – the anger united Lancashire and Yorkshire against the South and helped cast a shared Northern identity that transcended the Roses rivalry. This divide was illustrated in the 1924 County Championship, when Yorkshire beat London-based Middlesex to claim the title. Surrey accused Yorkshire of scuffing the pitch and intimidating the bowlers, while the match with Middlesex was so vicious that the team threatened to never play in Yorkshire again. The Lancashire captain Jack Sharp on the other hand was quoted as saying "I'm real glad a rose won it. Red or white, it doesn't matter." Durham are a recent addition to top-flight cricket, having only achieved first-class status in 1992, but have won the County Championship three times.

Although Yorkshire and Lancashire were traditionally more relaxed about professionalism than other counties, cricket did not see the same regional schisms on the topic that rugby and football did – there were debates over amateur status in first-class cricket, but these tensions were given release in the Gentlemen v Players fixture. Nevertheless, the annual North v South games were among the most popular and competitive in the sport, running annually from 1849 until 1900 and intermittently thereafter.

== Politics ==
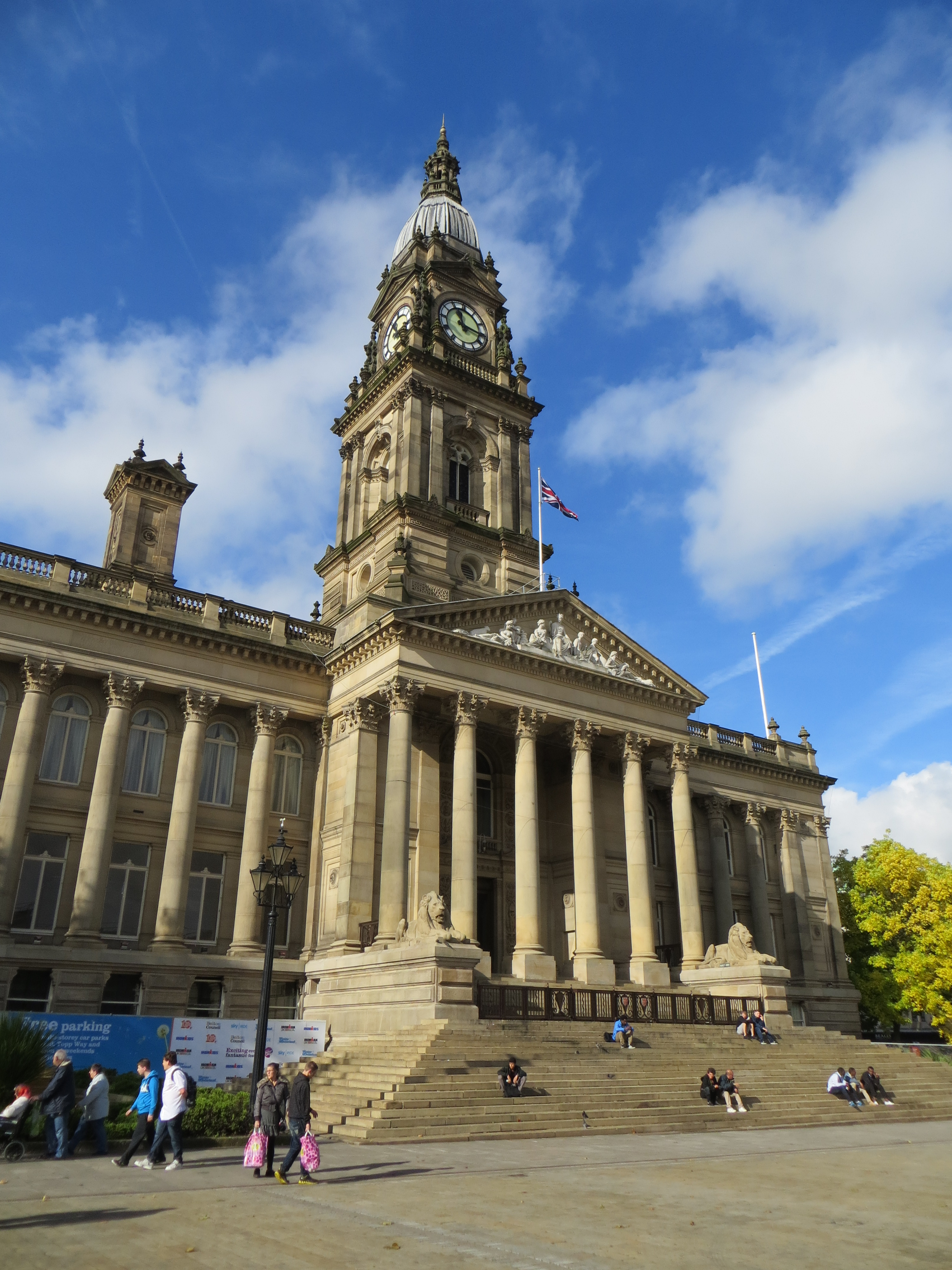
Bolton Town Hall

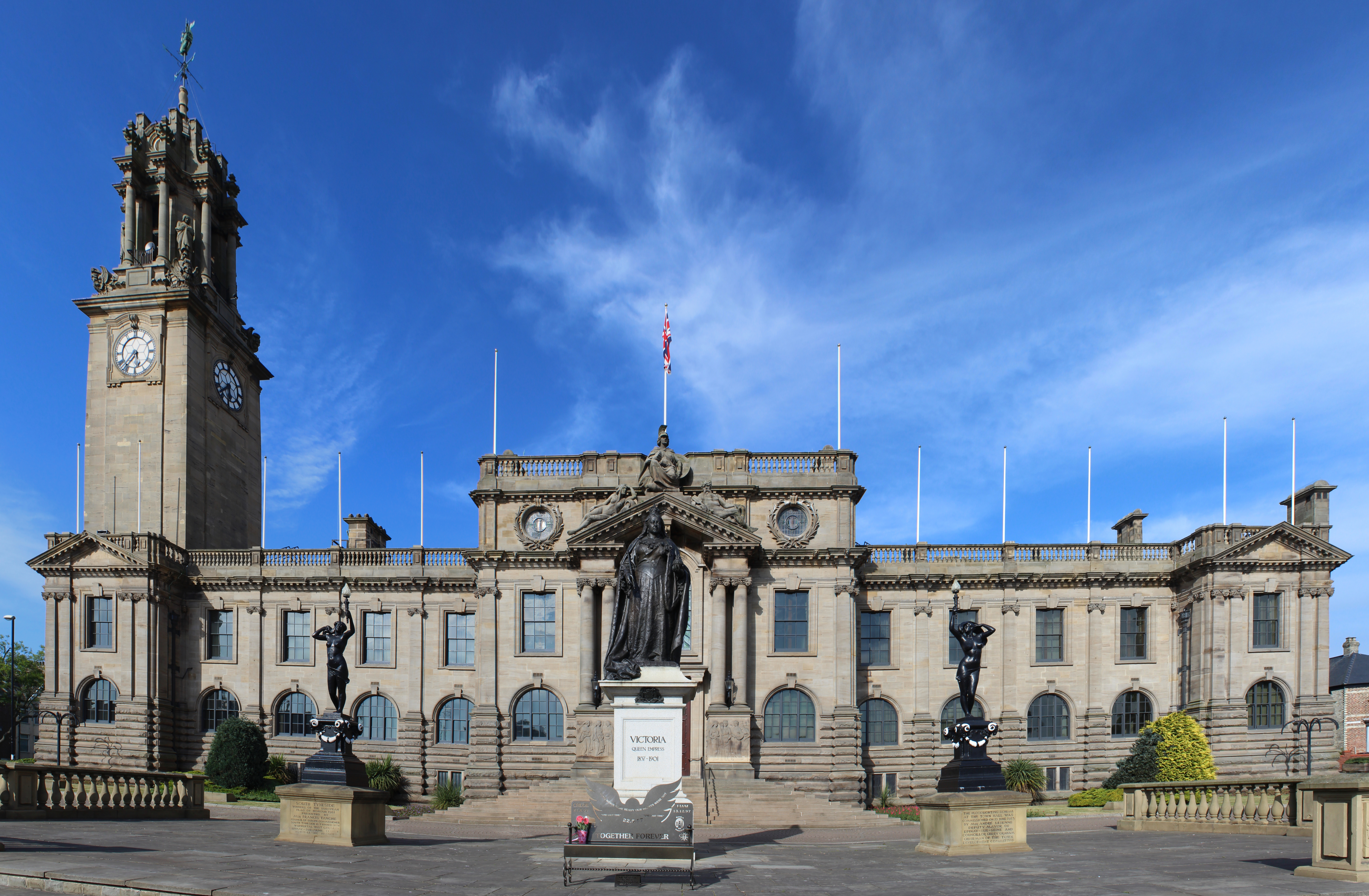
South Shields Town Hall

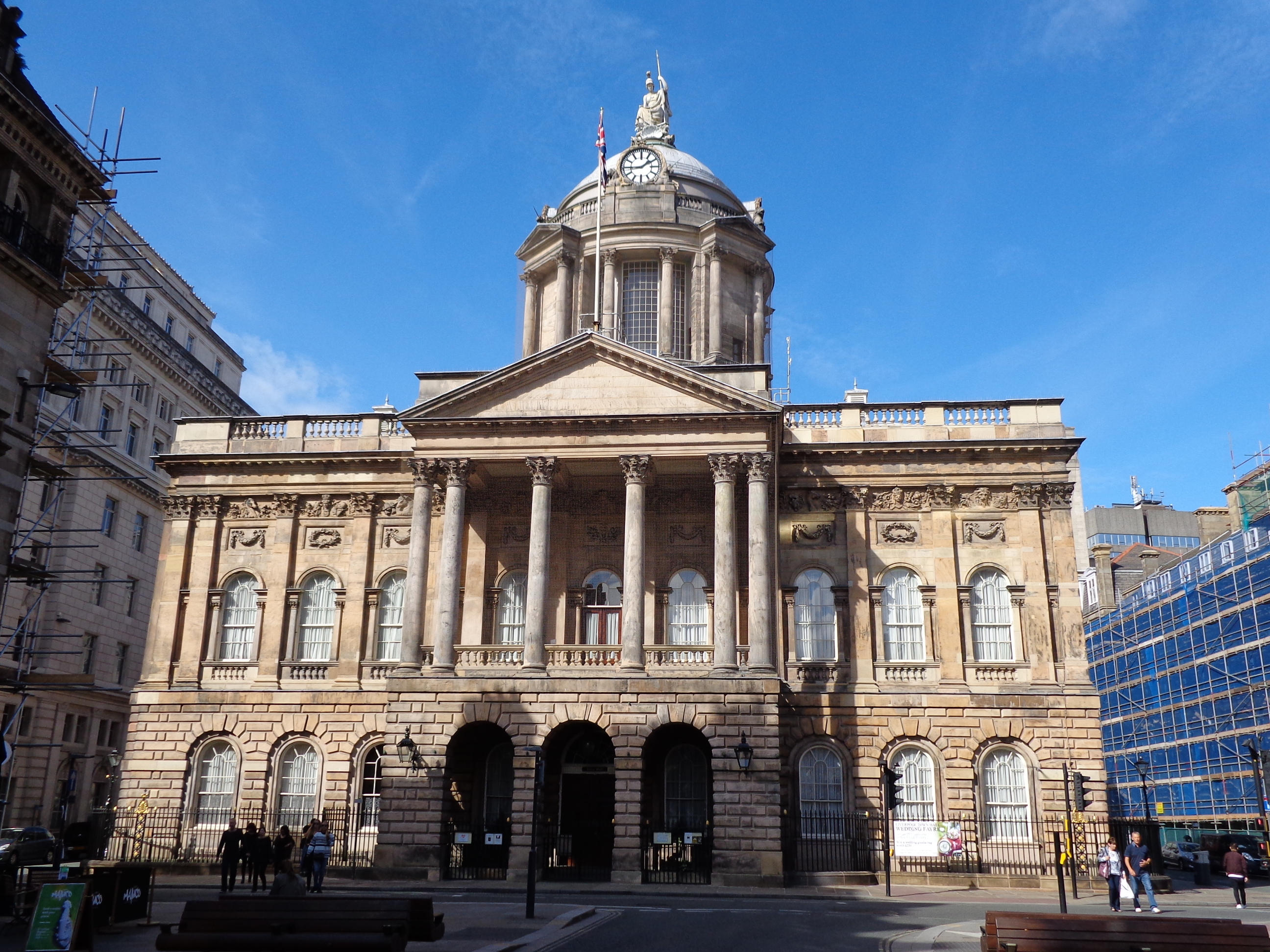
Liverpool Town Hall

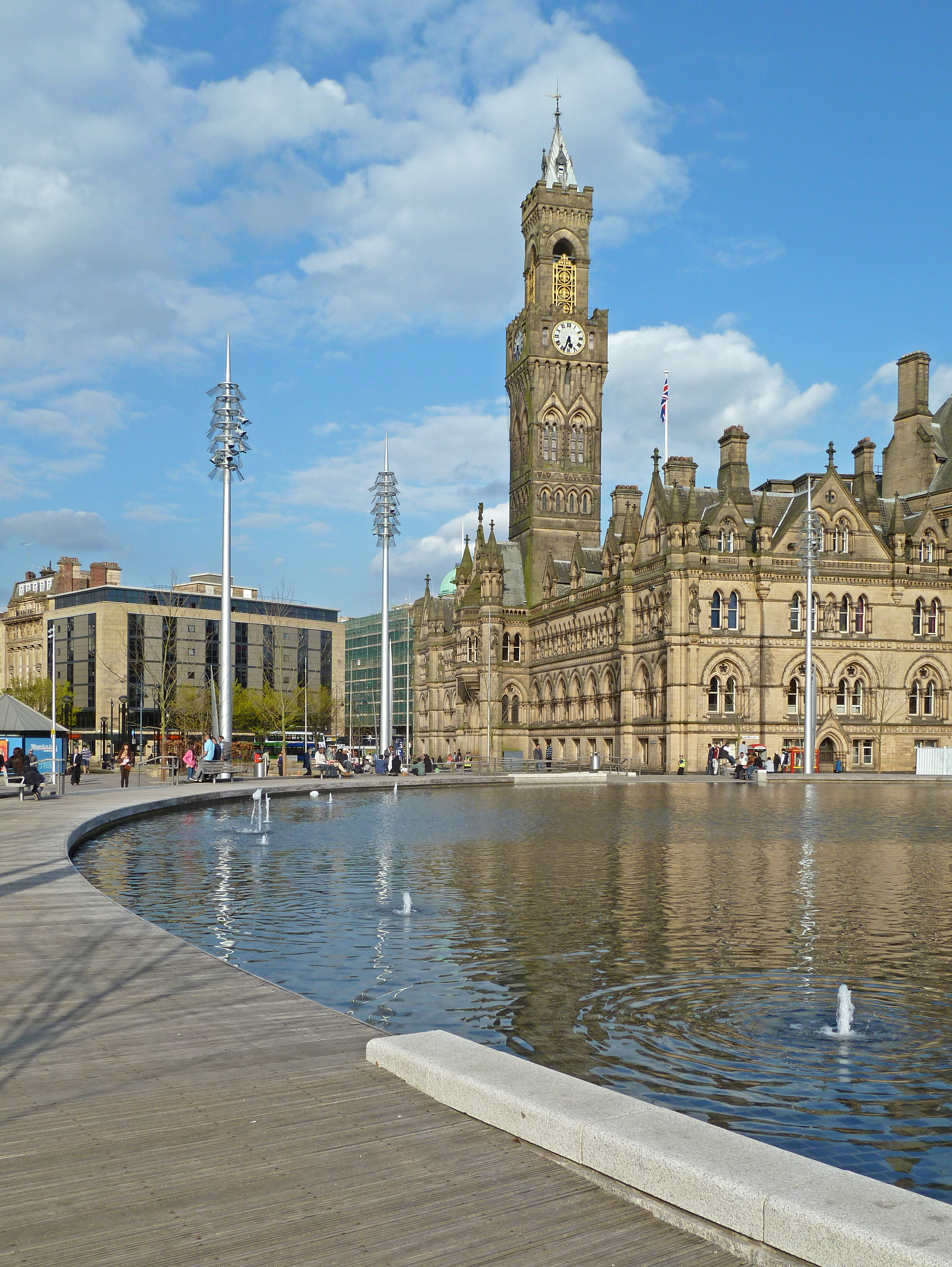
Bradford City Hall

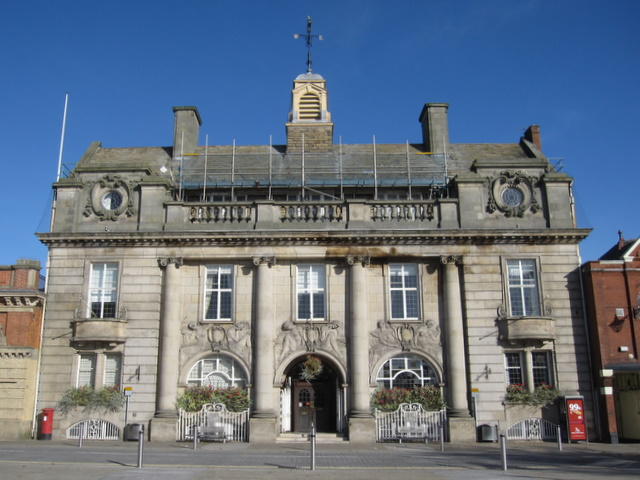
Crewe Municipal Buildings

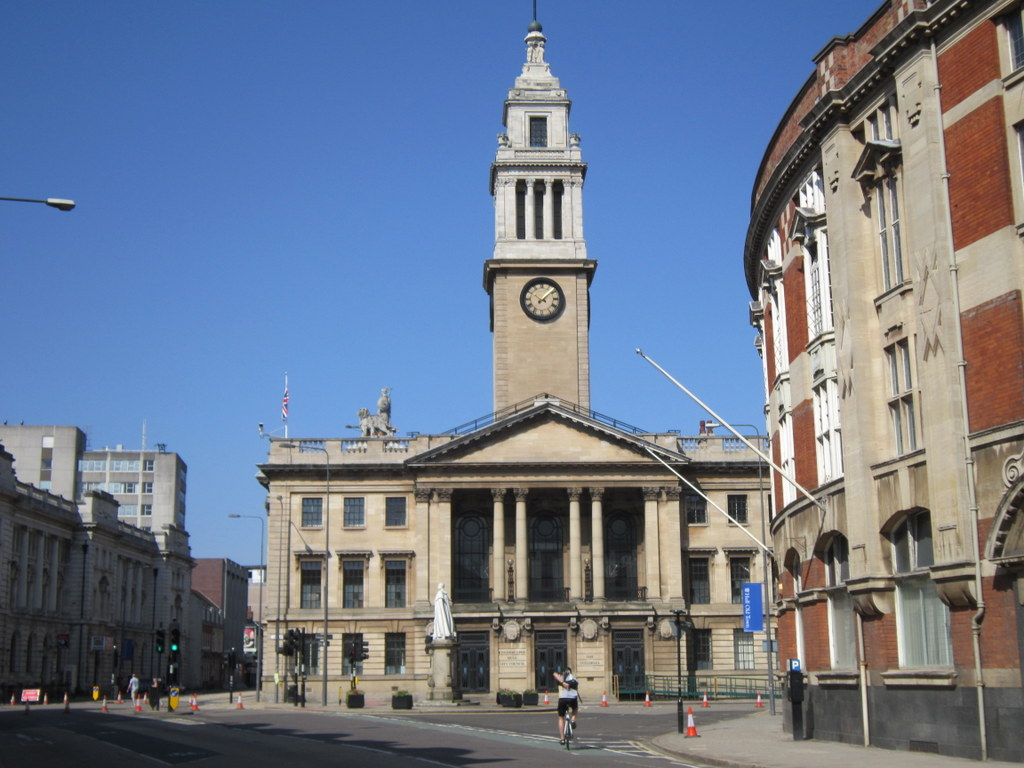
Hull Guildhall

Northern England, as the first area in the world to industrialise, was the birthplace of much modern political thought. Marxism and, more generally, socialism were shaped by reports into the lives of the Northern working class, from Friedrich Engels' The Condition of the Working Class in England to George Orwell's The Road to Wigan Pier. Meanwhile, enterprise and trade at the North's ports influenced the birth of Manchester Liberalism, a laissez-faire free trade philosophy. Expounded by C. P. Scott and the Manchester Guardian, the movement's greatest success was the repeal of the Corn Laws, protests against which had led to the 1819 Peterloo Massacre in Manchester.

Northern England remained the stronghold of the Labour party at the 2024 general election. Labour Conservative

The first Trades Union Congress was held in Manchester in 1868, and as of 2015 trade union membership in Northern England remained higher than in Southern England, although it is lower than in the other Home Nations. Since the Thatcher era, the Conservative Party struggled to gain support in the area. Today, Northern England is generally described as a stronghold of the Labour Party – although the Conservatives hold some rural seats, they traditionally held almost no urban seats and as of the 2021 local elections there are no Conservative councillors on Liverpool City Council, Manchester City Council or Newcastle City Council, and only one on Sheffield City Council. During the 2019 general election, many traditionally Labour constituencies in Northern England swung heavily towards the Conservatives, and the collapse of the "red wall" of Northern Labour seats was a major factor in the Conservative victory. Historically the region was also a heartland for the Liberals, and between the 1980s and the 2010s their successors in the Liberal Democrats benefited from Conservative unpopularity by positioning themselves as the centrist alternative to Labour in the North.

At the 2016 EU membership referendum, all three Northern England regions voted to leave, as did all English regions outside London. The largest Northern Remain vote was 60.4% in Manchester; the largest Leave vote was 69.9% in North East Lincolnshire. In total, the Leave vote in the Northern England regions was 55.9% – higher than in the Southern England regions and the other Home Nations, but lower than in the Midlands or the East of England. The Eurosceptic UK Independence Party (UKIP) positioned themselves as the main challenger to Labour in Northern constituencies, and came second in many at the 2015 general election. UKIP originally struggled in the region due to vote splitting with the far-right British National Party (BNP), who exploited racial tensions in the wake of the 2001 Bradford riots and other riots in Northern towns. In 2006, 40% of BNP voters lived in Northern England and both BNP MEPs elected at the 2009 European elections came from Northern constituencies. After 2013, BNP support in the region collapsed as most voters swung to UKIP. The Northern UKIP vote in turn collapsed following the EU referendum, with most UKIP voters returning to their former allegiances.

Campaigns for Northern English devolution have seen little electoral support. Plans by Labour under Tony Blair to create devolved regional assemblies for the three Northern regions were abandoned after the government lost the 2004 North East England devolution referendum against a No vote of 78%.

The regionalist Yorkshire Party and North East Party only hold seats at the local council level, and the Northern Party, which campaigned for a devolved Northern government with the power to make laws and full control of taxation and spending, was wound up in 2016. The Northern Independence Party was founded in October 2020, a secessionist and democratic socialist political party that seeks to make Northern England an independent nation, under the name of Northumbria.

Combined authority mayors form northern England launched The Great North Partnership, chaired by North East Mayor Kim McGuinness, in May 2025.

== Religion ==
=== Christianity ===
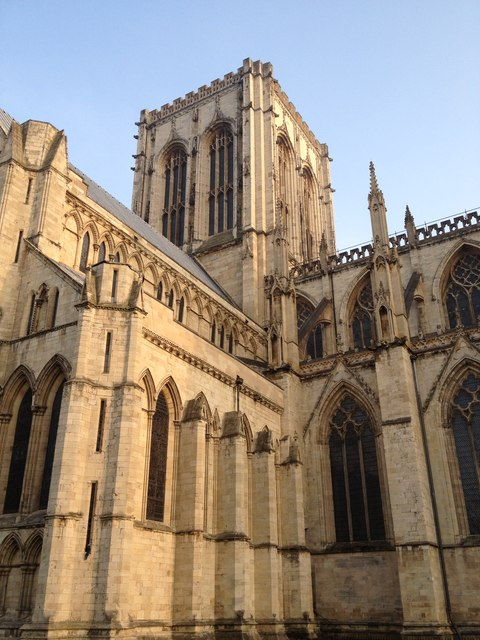
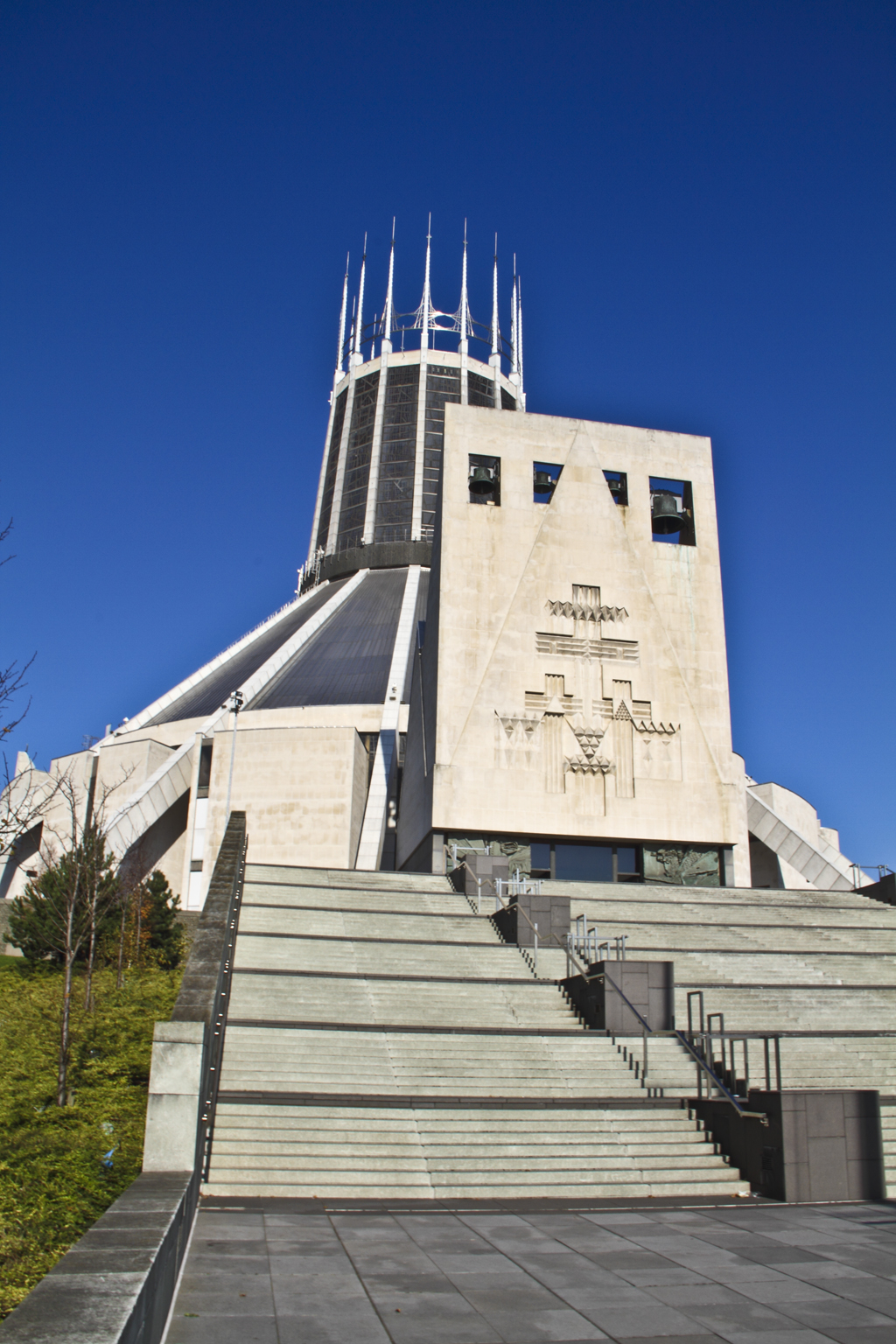

York Minster and the Anglican Province of York

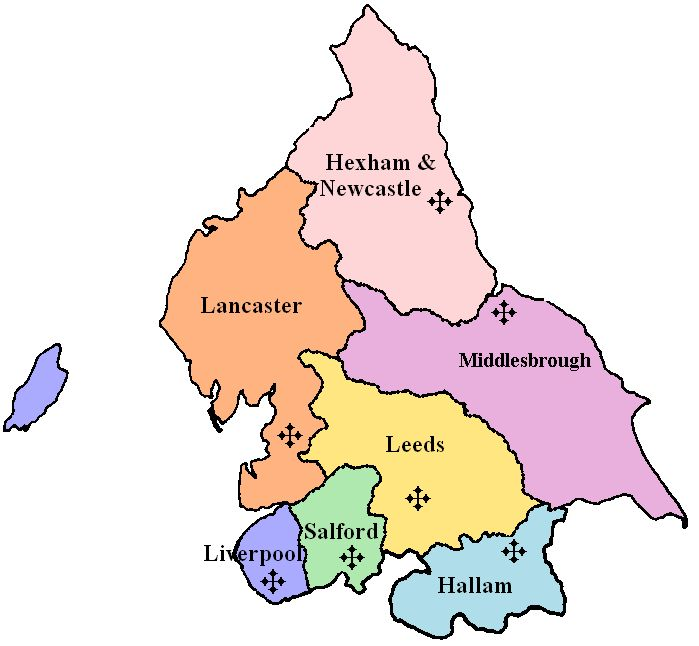
Liverpool Metropolitan Cathedral and Roman Catholic Archdiocese of Liverpool

Cathedrals of the Archbishop of York (Anglican) and Archbishop of Liverpool (Roman Catholic), the highest-ranking church officials in the North

Percentage of registered Catholics in the population in 1715–1720: Less than 3% 3–4% 5–8% 10–20% More than 20%

Christianity has been the largest religion in the region since the Early Middle Ages; its existence in Britain dates back to the late Roman era and the arrival of Celtic Christianity. The Holy Island of Lindisfarne played an essential role in the Christianisation of Northumbria, after Aidan from Connacht founded a monastery there as the first Bishop of Lindisfarne at the request of King Oswald. It is known for the creation of the Lindisfarne Gospels and remains a place of pilgrimage. Saint Cuthbert, a monk of Lindisfarne, was venerated from Nottinghamshire to Cumberland, and is today sometimes named the patron saint of Northern England. The Synod of Whitby saw Northumbria break from Celtic Christianity and return to the Roman Catholic church, as calculations of Easter and tonsure rules were brought into line with those of Rome.

After the English Reformation Northern England became a centre of Catholicism, and Irish immigration increased its numbers further, especially in North West cities like Liverpool and Manchester. In the 18th and 19th centuries, the area underwent a religious revival that ultimately produced Primitive Methodism, and at its peak in the 19th century Methodism was the dominant faith in much of Northern England.

As of 2016, the list of places of worship registered for marriage for Northern England included at least 1,960 that are Methodist or Independent Methodist, 1,200 Roman Catholic, 370 United Reformed, 310 Baptist or Particular Baptist, 250 Jehovah's Witness and 240 Salvation Army, as well as many hundreds of churches from smaller denominations. (Note: Anglican churches are not required to register and are not counted.)

In the ecclesiastical administration of the Church of England the entire North is covered by the Province of York, which is represented by the Archbishop of York – the second-highest figure in the Church after the Archbishop of Canterbury. The unusual situation of having two archbishops at the top of Church hierarchy suggests that Northern England was seen as a sui generis. Likewise, with the exception of parts of the Diocese of Shrewsbury and Diocese of Nottingham, the North is covered in Roman Catholic Church administration by the Province of Liverpool, represented by the Archbishop of Liverpool.

=== Other faiths ===
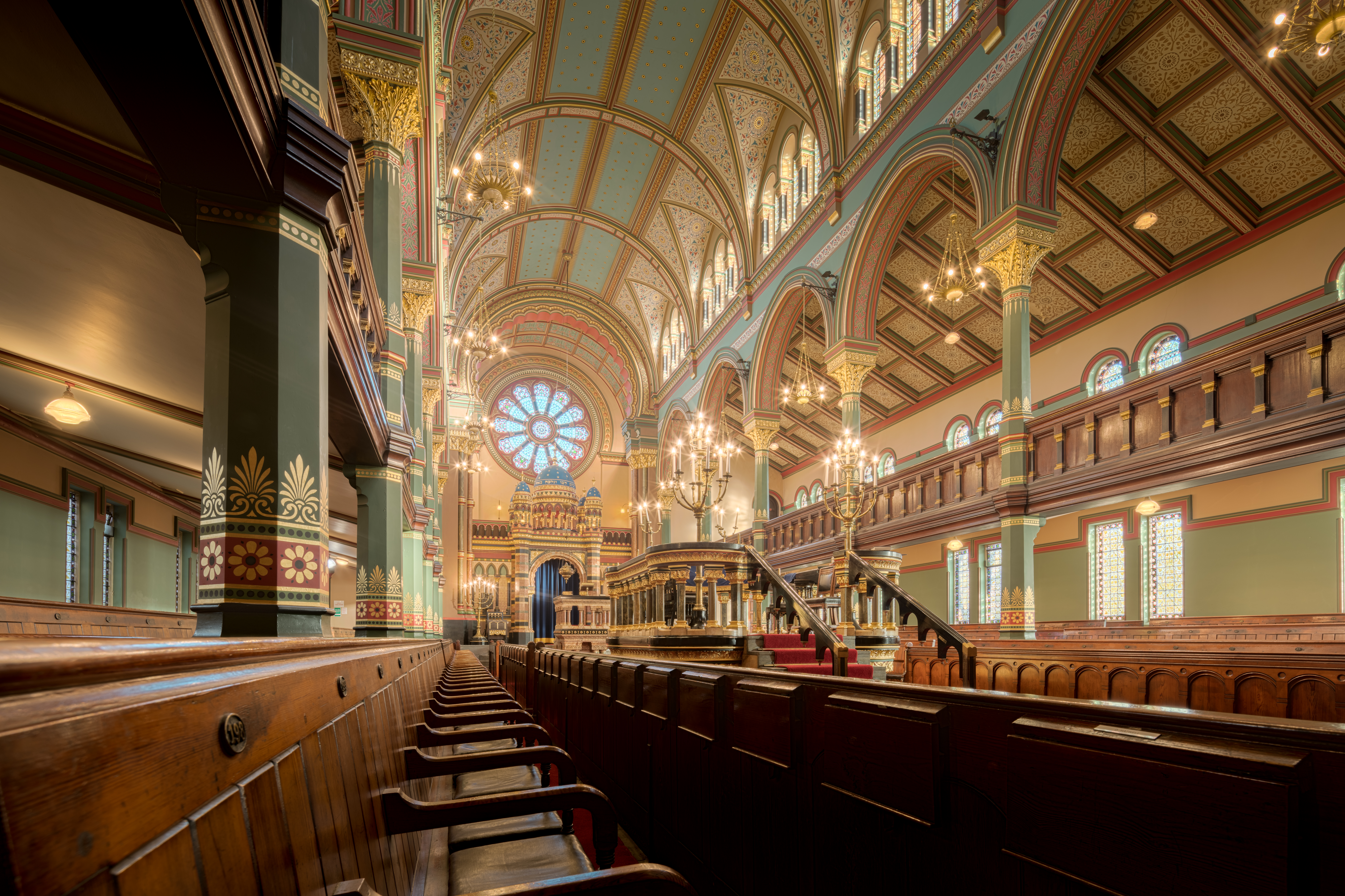
Princes Road Synagogue

Small Jewish communities arose in Beverley, Doncaster, Grimsby, Lancaster, Newcastle, and York in the wake of the Norman Conquest but suffered massacres and pogroms, of which the largest was the York Massacre in 1190. Jews were forcibly banished from England by the 1290 Edict of Expulsion until the Resettlement of the Jews in England in the seventeenth century, and the first synagogue in the North appeared in Liverpool in 1753. Manchester also has a long-standing Jewish community: the now-demolished 1857 Manchester Reform Synagogue was the second Reform synagogue in the country, and Greater Manchester has the only eruv in the United Kingdom outside London. Traditionally, there is also a large Jewish presence in Gateshead. In total, there are 84 synagogues in Northern England registered for marriages.

Spiritualism flourished in Northern England in the nineteenth century, in part as a backlash to the fundamentalist Primitive Methodist movement and in part driven by the influence of Owenist socialism. There remain 220 Spiritualist churches registered in the North, of which 40 identify as Christian Spiritualist.

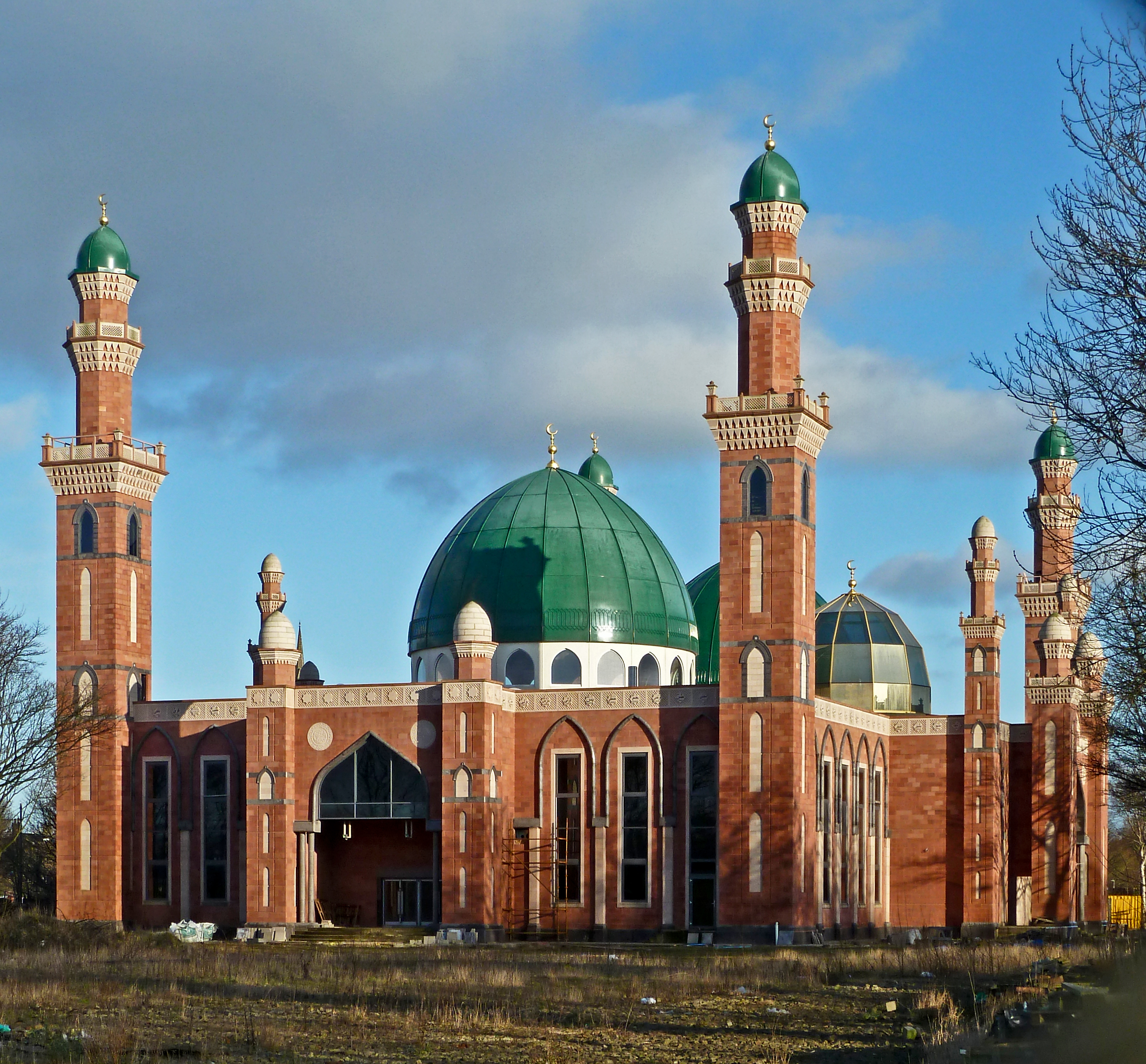
Bradford Grand Mosque

The first mosque in the United Kingdom was founded by the convert Abdullah Quilliam in the Liverpool Muslim Institute in 1889. Today, there are around 500 mosques in Northern England. Indian religions are also represented: there are at least 45 gurdwaras, of which the largest is the Sikh Temple in Leeds, and 30 mandirs, of which the largest is Bradford Lakshmi Narayan Hindu Temple.

== Transport ==
Transport in the North has been shaped by the Pennines, creating strong north–south axes along each coast and an east–west axis across the moorland passes of the southern Pennines. Northern England is a centre of freight transport and handles around one third of all British cargo. Both passenger and freight links between Northern cities remain poor, which is a major weakness of the Northern economy.

The passenger transport executive (PTE) has become a major player in the organisation of public transport within Northern city regions; of the six PTEs in England, five (Transport for Greater Manchester, Merseytravel, Travel South Yorkshire, Nexus Tyne and Wear and West Yorkshire Metro) are located in the North. These coordinate bus services, local trains and light rail in their regions. Following the passage of the Cities and Local Government Devolution Act 2016, Transport for the North became a statutory body in 2018 with powers to coordinate services and offer integrated ticketing throughout the region.

=== Road ===
The Preston By-pass, opened in 1958, was the first motorway in the UK. The major north-south motorway routes are the western M6 and eastern M1/A1(M), the Great North Road became the modern A1 road with the M1 using an alternative route and the A1 (M) is the upgraded A1. The A19 is a major north-south A-road also in the east. The M62 (over the south Pennines) is the major east-west motorway, it follows the Roman road between York and Chester. The A59, A66 and A69 are also major east-west A-roads.

Older streets in the north are called gates with a number of terms for small streets such as chare, wynd, tenfoot, vennel, snicket and ginnel. York goes as far as to merge the latter two terms with alleyway to form the term snickelways. These small streets can be cobbled or block-paved; pitched paving is a common in-between type of paving most often used.

Buses are an important part of the Northern transport mix, with bus ridership above the England and Wales average in all three Northern regions. Many of the municipal bus companies were located in Northern England creating intense competition and bus wars following deregulation in the 1980s and 1990s. Increasing car ownership in the same era caused bus use to decline, although it remains higher than in most areas of the South.

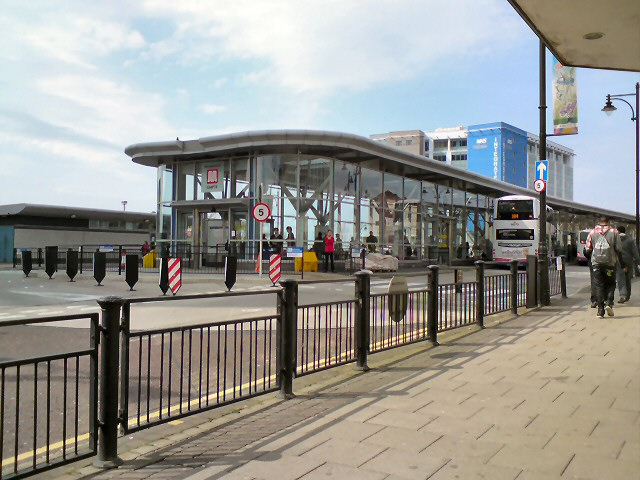
Oldham Bus Station

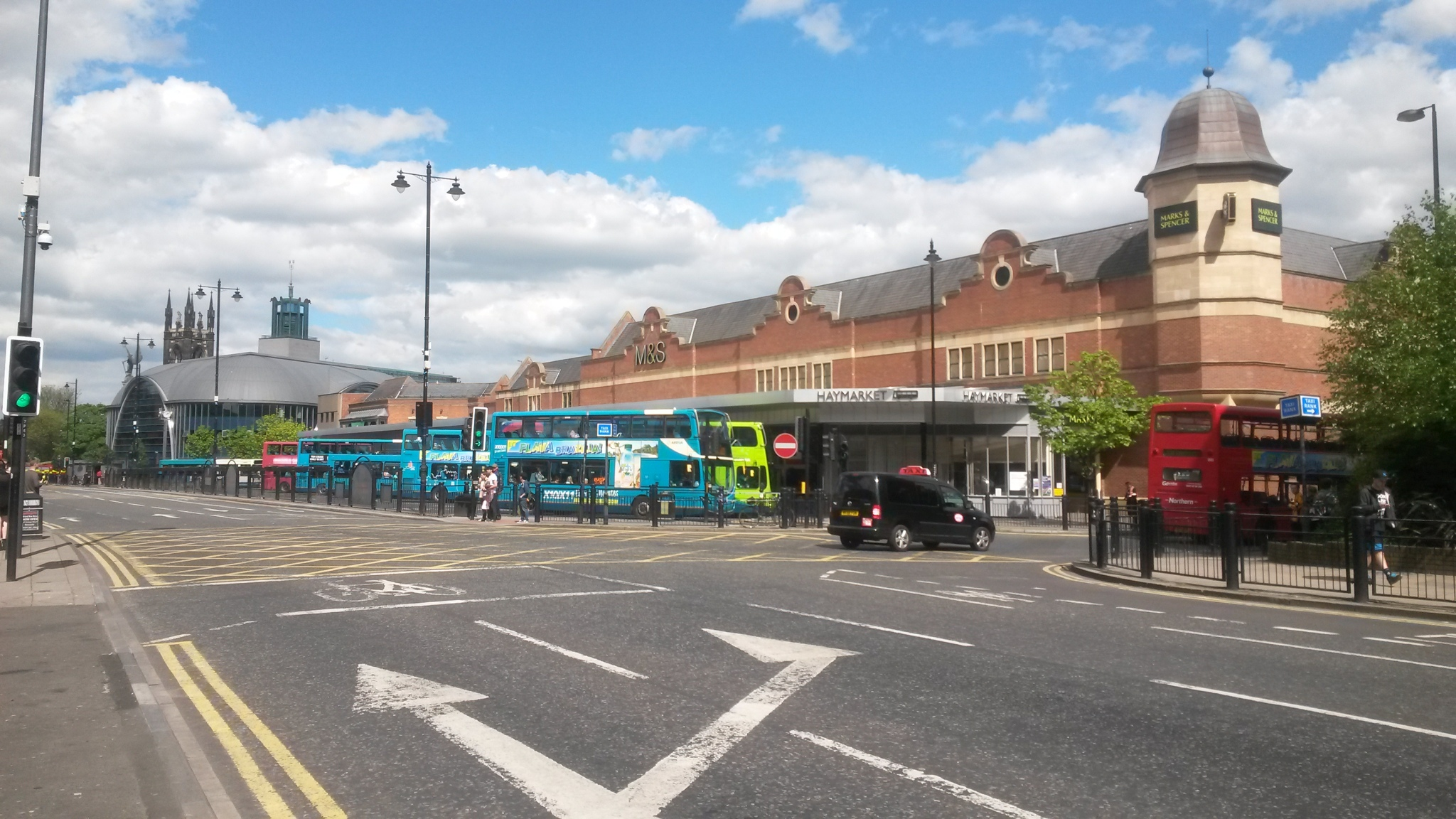
Haymarket bus station, Newcastle upon Tyne

=== Rail ===
The North of England pioneered rail transport. Milestones include the 1758 Middleton Railway in Leeds, the first railway authorised by Act of Parliament and the oldest continually operating in the world; the 1825 Stockton and Darlington Railway, the first public railway to use steam locomotives; and the 1830 Liverpool and Manchester Railway, the first modern main line. Today the region retains many of its original railway lines, including the East Coast and West Coast main lines and the Cross Country Route. Passenger numbers on Northern routes increased over 50% between 2004 and 2016, and Northern England handles over half of total UK rail freight, but infrastructure is poorly funded compared to Southern railways: railways in London received £5426 per resident in 2015 while those in the North East received just £223 per resident, and journeys between major cities are slow and overcrowded.

To combat this, the Department of Transport has devolved many of its powers to Rail North, an alliance of local authorities from the Scottish Borders down to Staffordshire which manages the Northern Rail and TransPennine Express franchises that operate many routes in Northern England. Meanwhile, new build such as the Northern Hub around Manchester and Northern Powerhouse Rail from Liverpool to Hull and Newcastle is planned to increase capacity on important Northern routes and decrease travel times. The planned High Speed 2 (HS2) line would have connected Manchester and Leeds to Birmingham and London, but cuts to HS2 saw all Northern branches of the line cancelled.

The first passenger tram line in the UK was built in Birkenhead and opened on 30 August 1860 (partially open intermittently as a heritage tramway). Trams turned out to be especially well suited for Northern cities, with their growing working-class suburbs, and by the turn of the century, most Northern towns had an extensive interconnected electric tram network. At the network's height, it was possible to travel entirely by tram from Liverpool Pier Head to the village of Summit, outside Rochdale, a distance of 52 miles (84 km), and a gap of only 7 miles (11 km) separated the North-Western network from the West Yorkshire network. Starting in the 1930s, these were largely replaced by motor buses and trolley buses. With the closure of Sheffield Tramway in 1960 and Glasgow Tramway in 1962, Blackpool Tramway – popular as a tourist attraction as much as a means of transport – was left as the only public tram system in the UK until the Manchester Metrolink opened in 1992. Today there are four light rail systems in the North – Blackpool Tramway, Manchester Metrolink, Sheffield Supertram and Tyne & Wear Metro.

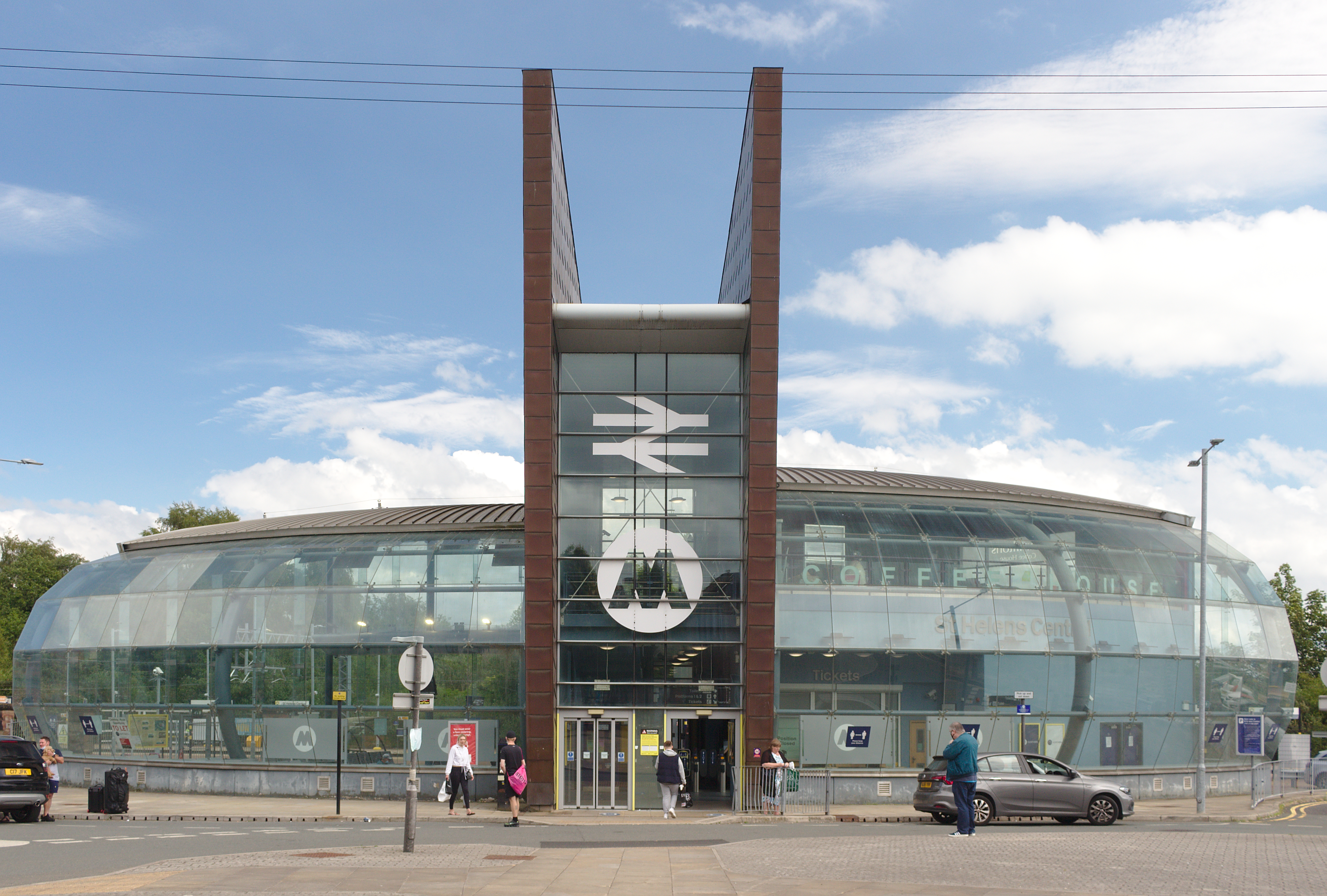
St Helens Central railway station

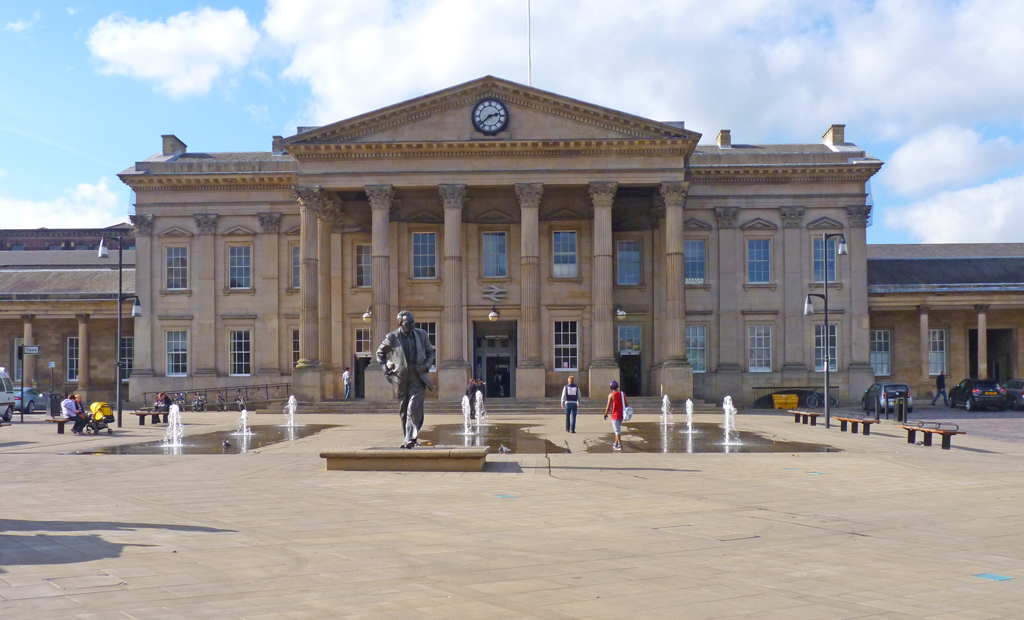
Huddersfield railway station

=== Air ===
International airports of Northern England

In total, there are six international airports in the North; these are (in descending order of passenger traffic) Manchester, Newcastle, Liverpool John Lennon, Leeds Bradford, Teesside and Humberside.

Manchester Airport is a major hub and the busiest airport anywhere in the UK outside London, handling 23.3 million people in 2022 (10.5% of all UK passengers), and Newcastle (4.1 million), Liverpool (3.5 million) and Leeds-Bradford (3.3 million) serve their city regions.

Other airports in the North have struggled. Teesside and Humberside both see very little traffic while other airports have closed to commercial flights entirely: Blackpool closed in 2014, Carlisle Lake District in 2020 and Doncaster Sheffield in 2022. Many of these airports were developed during the boom in low-cost air travel during the early 2000s and suffered following the Great Recession and COVID lockdowns.

The devolution of Air Passenger Duty in Scotland allows Scottish airports to offer cheaper flights than their English rivals as well as London airports turning Northern airports to spoke airports, forcing connecting passengers to travel via London or continental European airports for major destinations.

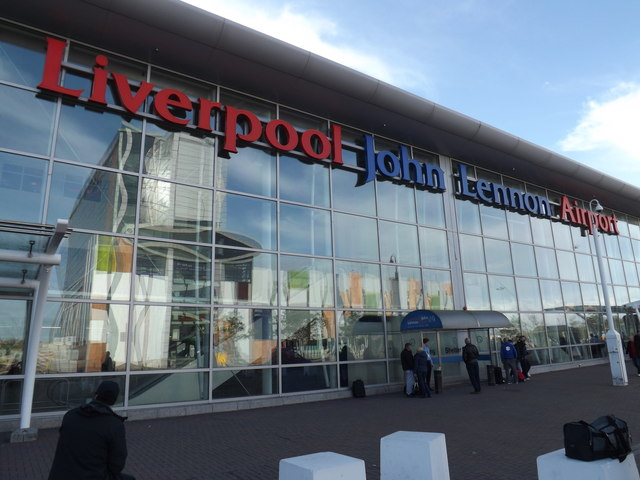
Liverpool John Lennon Airport

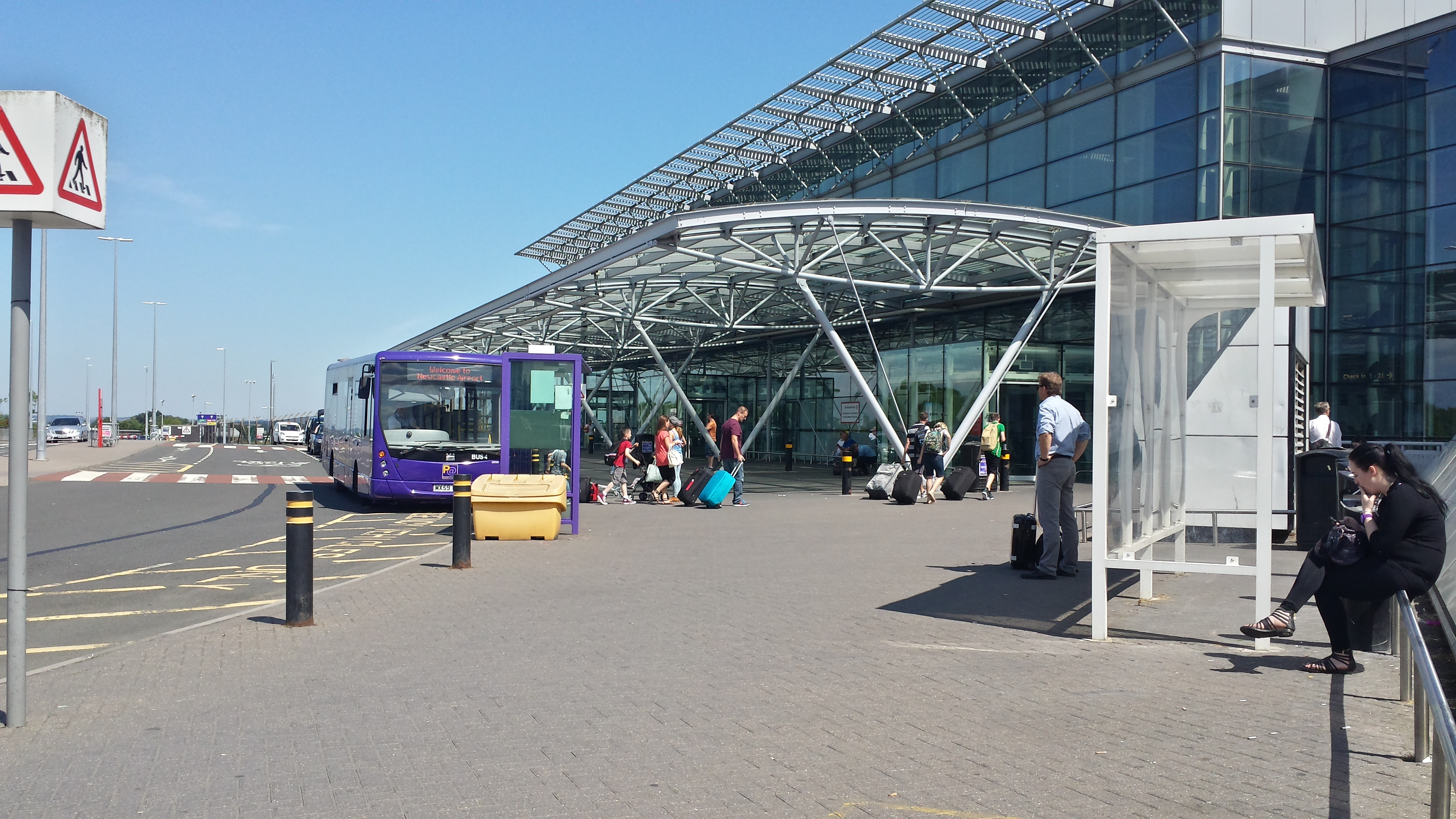
Newcastle International Airport

=== Water ===
The first modern canal in England was Sankey Brook, opened in 1757 to connect Liverpool's ports to the St Helens coalfields. By 1777, the Grand Trunk Canal had opened, linking the rivers Mersey and Trent and making it possible for boats to travel directly from Liverpool to Hull. Manchester, 40 miles (64 km) inland, was connected to the Irish Sea by the Manchester Ship Canal in 1894, although the canal never saw the success that was hoped for. The North retains many navigable canals, including the Cheshire, North Pennine and South Pennine canal rings, although they are now used mostly for pleasure rather than transport – the Aire and Calder Navigation, which carries over 2 million tons of oil, sand and gravel per year, is a rare exception.

Many Northern coastal towns were built on trade, and retain large sea ports. The Humber ports of Grimsby and Immingham (counted as a single port for statistical purposes) are the busiest in the UK in terms of tonnage, serving 59.1 million tons as of 2015, and Teesport and the Port of Liverpool are also among the country's largest – in total, 35% of British freight was shipped through Northern ports. Roll-on/roll-off ferries offer passenger and freight connections to the Isle of Man and Ireland along the west coast, while east coast ports connect to Belgium and the Netherlands, although Northern ports handle only a small percentage of the UK's vehicle traffic. Liverpool Cruise Terminal opened in 2007, cruises also operate out of Port of Hull and Newcastle International Ferry Terminal.

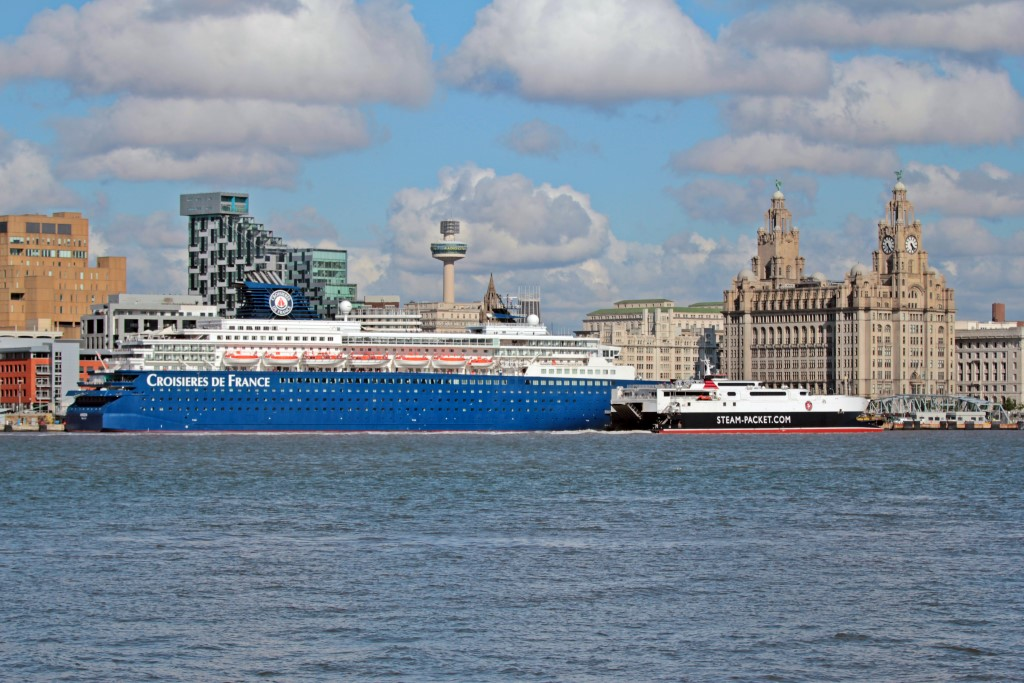
Liverpool Cruise Terminal

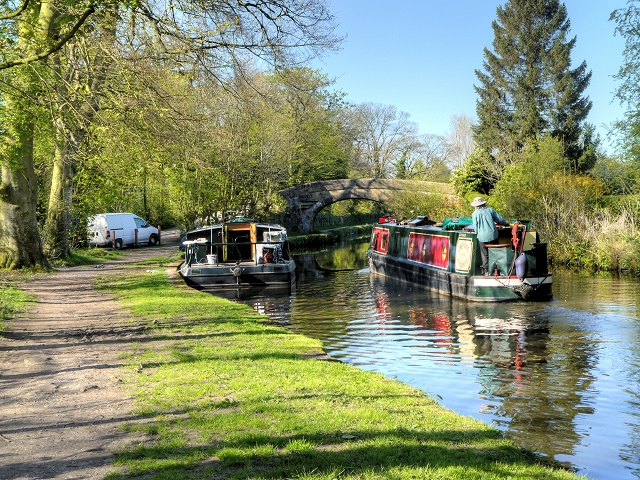
Leeds and Liverpool Canal

== See also ==
- Black Country
- Convention of the North
- Cornwall
- Devolution to the North of England
- East Anglia
- Greater London
- Home counties
- The Midlands
- Southern England
- Welsh Marches
- West Country
- West of England
