= Golden Triangle =

Golden Triangle or golden triangle may refer to:

== Places ==
=== Asia ===
- Golden Triangle (Southeast Asia), named for its opium production
- Golden Triangle (Yangtze), China, named for its rapid economic development
- Golden Triangle (India), comprising the popular tourist spots Delhi, Agra and Jaipur
- Golden Triangle of Jakarta, the main central business district of Jakarta, Indonesia
- Golden Triangle Special Economic Zone, situated on the Lao side of the border between Thailand and Myanmar.
- Minnan Golden Triangle, economic production area in the Fujian province of China, includes Xiamen, Quanzhou and Zhangzhou
- Liaoning, nickname Golden Triangle, in northeastern China

=== Europe ===
- Golden Triangle (Algarve), an affluent tourist area in the Algarve, Portugal
- Golden Triangle (Finland), an informal area between the cities of Helsinki, Turku, and Tampere
- Golden Triangle of Art, formed by three prominent museums in Madrid, Spain

==== United Kingdom ====
- Golden Triangle (Cheshire), named for its affluence
- Golden Triangle, an affluent area in the Epping Forest district between Chigwell, Loughton and Buckhurst Hill, Essex
- Golden Triangle (Norwich), a popular, affluent residential quarter
- Golden Triangle (Surrey), residential area with some of the highest property prices in the country.
- Golden Triangle (Yorkshire), the wealthy property triangle of North Leeds, Harrogate and York
- Golden triangle (universities), informal grouping of research universities in south east England
- Golden logistics triangle, a section of the English Midlands with good connectivity to the rest of the country

=== North America ===
==== Canada ====
- Golden Triangle (cycling route), named for the town of Golden, British Columbia, which forms one point
- Golden Triangle, Ottawa, named for the property triangle in Ottawa between Elgin Street and the Rideau Canal

==== Mexico ====
- Golden Triangle, a region in the Mexican north-west controlled by the Sinaloa Cartel

==== United States ====
in order of state then city

- Golden Triangle (Rocky Mountains), a fly fishing area in the Montana/Wyoming/Idaho region
- Golden Triangle (California), part of the airspace at Edwards Air Force Base
- Golden Triangle, the central business district of Beverly Hills, California
- Golden Triangle, San Diego, or University City
- Golden Triangle, in Saratoga, California
- Rincon de los Esteros, San Jose, in San Jose, California in Silicon Valley
- Golden Triangle, Denver, an informal name for a downtown Denver neighborhood in Colorado
- Golden Triangle (Kentucky), the area outlined by Lexington, Louisville and Northern Kentucky
- Golden Triangle (Massachusetts), a retail district
- Golden Triangle (Mississippi), the area outlined by Columbus, Starkville, and West Point
  - Golden Triangle Regional Airport, Mississippi
- Golden Triangle (Montana), a folk region in the northern plains of Montana
- Golden Triangle, New Jersey, an unincorporated community
- Golden Triangle (New Hampshire), the area outlined by Manchester, Nashua and Salem
- Golden Triangle (Pittsburgh), Pennsylvania, the wedge-shaped central business district formed by the Allegheny and Monongahela Rivers
- Golden Triangle (Texas), the area outlined by Beaumont, Port Arthur, and Orange
- Golden Triangle Mall, Denton, Texas
- Golden Triangle (Washington, D.C.), a neighborhood and business improvement district
- Golden Triangle (Wisconsin), the area along the Chippewa and Eau Claire Rivers

=== Oceania ===
==== Australia ====
- Golden Triangle, nickname for an area in the Brisbane central business district
- Golden Triangle, nickname for the Goldfields region of Victoria
- Golden Triangle, nickname for the Western Suburbs of Perth

==== New Zealand ====
- Golden Triangle (New Zealand), informal name for the adjacent cities of Auckland, Hamilton and Tauranga.

== Arts and entertainment ==
- Golden Triangles, another name for the Triforce in the Universe of The Legend of Zelda series of video games
- Golden Triangle, the record label of the Australian band Mammoth Mammoth
- "Golden Triangle", a song by Jolin Tsai from the 2007 album Agent J
- "The Golden Triangle", an episode of the action-adventure television series MacGyver

== Other uses ==
- Golden triangle (composition), a rule of thumb for composition in photographs or paintings
- Golden triangle (mathematics), an isosceles triangle whose sides are in the golden ratio
  - Kimberling's golden triangle, Clark Kimberling's extension of the golden ratio
- Golden triangle (slavery), the historic triangular trade of slaves across the Atlantic
- Golden Triangle (train), a train operated by the Pennsylvania Railroad
- Golden Triangle, a named frequency of the PATrain commuter rail service

== See also ==
- Gold triangles (Hypsopygia costalis), the clover hay moth
