= Triangle (disambiguation) =

A triangle is a geometric shape with three sides.

Triangle may also refer to:

== Mathematics ==
- Exact triangle, a collection of objects in category theory
- Triangle inequality, Euclid's proposition that the sum of any two sides of a triangle is longer than the third side
- American expression for set square, an object used in engineering and technical drawing, with the aim of providing a straightedge at a right angle or other particular planar angle to a baseline
- The triangle graph in graph theory

== Entertainment ==
=== Music ===
- Triangle (musical instrument), in the percussion family
- Tri Angle (record label), in New York and London
- Triangle (band) a Japanese pop group in 1970s
- The Triangles, Australian band

==== Albums ====
- Tri-Angle, a 2004 album by TVXQ
- Triangle (The Beau Brummels album), 1967
- Triangle (Perfume album), 2009
- Triangle (Diaura album), 2014
- Triangle, a 2008 album by Mi Lu Bing
- Triangle, a 2011 EP by 10,000 Maniacs

=== Film ===
- Triangle Film Corporation, a film studio in the U.S. during the silent era
- The Triangle (film), a 2001 made-for-TV thriller
- Triangle (2007 film), a Hong Kong crime-thriller
- Triangle (2009 British film), a British-Australian psychological thriller
- Triangle (2009 South Korean film), a South Korean-Japanese comedy
- The Triangle, a 1953 film starring Douglas Fairbanks Jr.

=== Television ===
- The Triangle (miniseries), a 2005 Sci-Fi Channel series
- Triangle (1981 TV series), a 1980s BBC soap opera
- Triangle (2014 TV series), a 2014 MBC Korean drama
- "Triangle" (Buffy the Vampire Slayer), 2001
- "Triangle" (President Curtis), 2026
- "Triangle" (The X-Files), 1998
- "The Triangle" (The Amazing World of Gumball), 2015
- "The Triangle" (The Golden Girls), 1985
- "Triangle", a three part episode of Crown Court
- "Triangles", an episode of Private Practice

== Games ==
- Slapball, a baseball street variant
- Triangle offense, an offensive strategy used in basketball

== Places ==
- Bermuda Triangle, area of the North Atlantic between Bermuda, Florida, and Puerto Rico
- Le Triangle, a residential district in Montreal
- Triangle, Newfoundland and Labrador, Canada
- Triangle (Israel), a concentration of Israeli Arab towns
- Triangle Region (Denmark) (Trekanten), a sub-region on the Jutland Peninsula
- Trianglen, Copenhagen, a large intersection in Copenhagen, Denmark
- Research Triangle, a region of North Carolina, U.S., anchored by Raleigh, Durham, and Chapel Hill
- Rhubarb Triangle, an area of West Yorkshire, England known for the cultivation of forced rhubarb
- Triangle, New York, United States
- Triangle, Virginia, United States
- Triangle, West Yorkshire, a village in Calderdale, England
- Triangle, Zimbabwe

== Other uses ==
- Triangle (chart pattern), in financial technical analysis
- Triangle (novel), a 1983 Star Trek novel
- Triangle (Paris building)
- Triangle (railway), an English term equivalent to a North American Wye rail
- Triangle Pose, a yoga āsana
- Triangle Fraternity, social fraternity for STEM Students
- Triangle Rewards, a loyalty program offered by Canadian Tire
- The Triangle (newspaper), at Drexel University
- The Triangle, Manchester, a building in England
- Triangles (novel), a 2011 novel by Ellen Hopkins
- Trigonodes hyppasia or Triangles, a species of moth
- Weimar Triangle, a regional alliance of France, Germany, and Poland
- Delta (letter), in the Greek alphabet, whose uppercase (Δ) resembles a triangle
- Bansiot (ㅿ), in the Korean alphabet Hangul, which resembles a triangle
- a street circuit near the north coast of Northern Ireland used for the North West 200 motorcycle races

== See also ==
- Triangle Lake (disambiguation)
- Triangle Park (disambiguation)
- Triangeln station, a railway station in Malmö, Sweden
- Triangular trade
- Triangular election in France
- Triangulum (disambiguation)
- Golden Triangle
