= Golden Triangle (Surrey) =

Affluent area of southeast England

Coordinates: 51.3549°N 0.4018°W

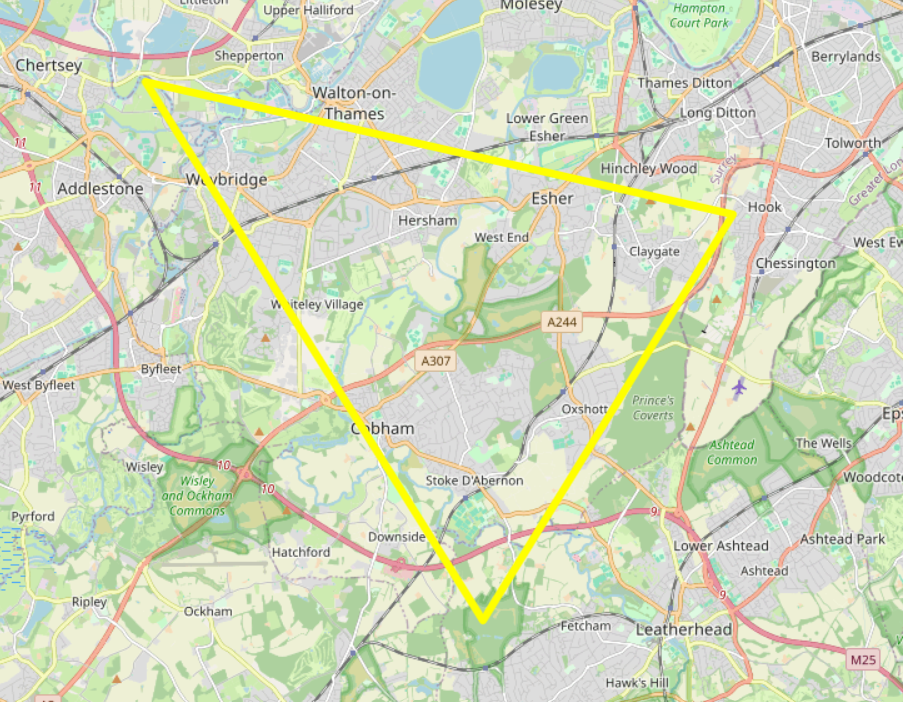
Approximate boundaries of the Golden Triangle

The Golden Triangle is a term used largely by estate agents but also in the press to refer to an area of Surrey which is considered desirable for its large country properties on private estates while also providing close access to London.

The area became particularly well known for being popular among the wealthy, with its residents counting celebrities and footballers among them, accelerated by the move of Chelsea F. C.'s training grounds to Stoke d'Abernon at the southern corner of the triangle in 2007. This has brought it into comparison with other "golden triangles" such as that of Cheshire, which many Manchester City and Manchester United F.C. players call home, as well as that of Yorkshire. Due to the nature of the clientele of properties in the area, it has been seen as particularly lucrative among estate agents. With its reputation for lavish homes, it was described by The Independent as "Kensington in the Country" in 2020. Such a reputation however has also brought the area derision for its elitist nature, and association with oligarchs.

St George's Hill, one of the most exclusive estates within the triangle, was ironically the home of the Diggers in 1649, a group which is regarded as a sort of prototypical socialist commune practising something similar to what would later come to be known as agrarian socialism.

== Boundaries ==
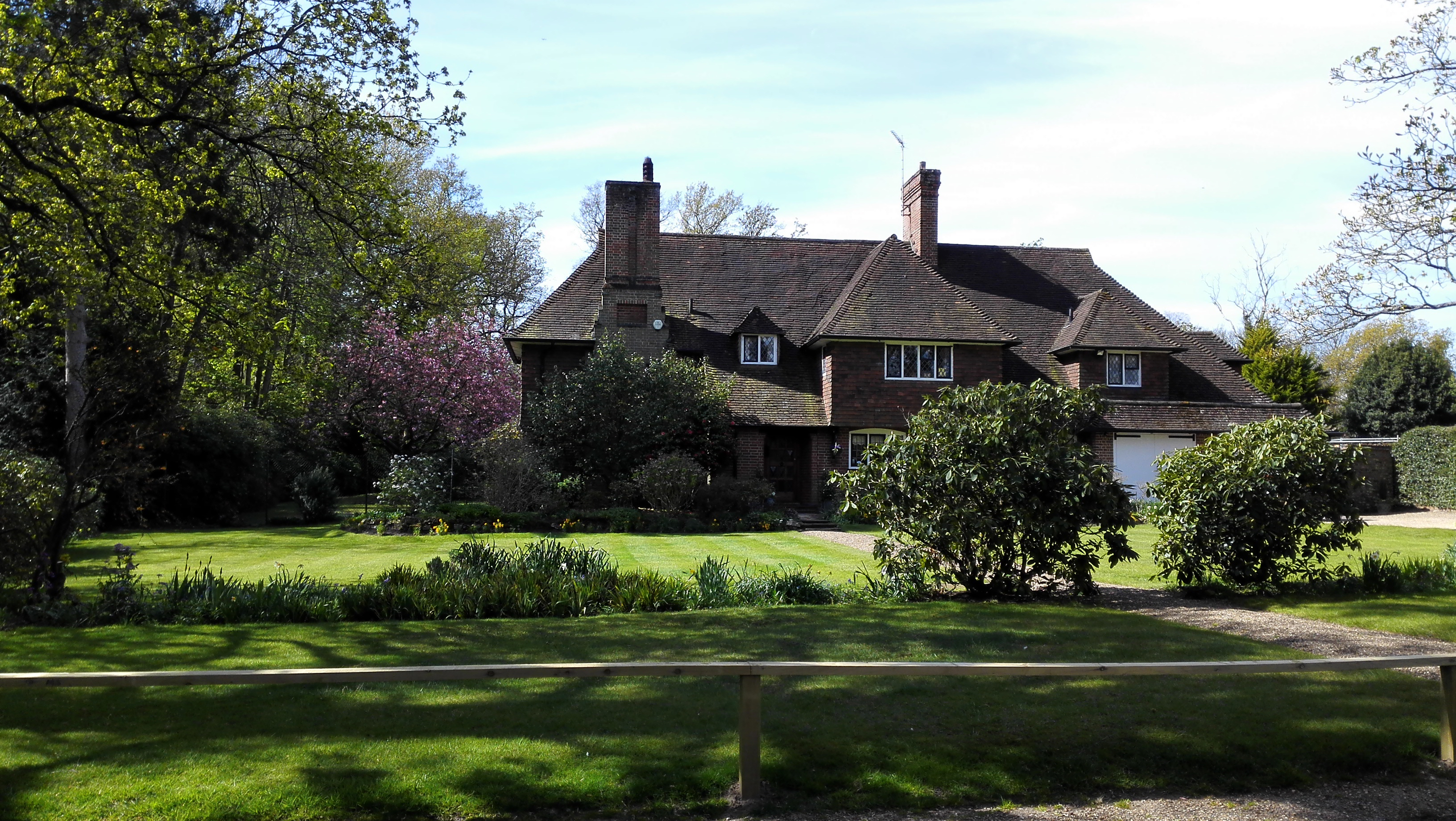
A typical home in the Burwood Park estate within the Golden Triange

The area does not have exact boundaries, a wider definition might bound it by the border with Greater London to the east, the Thames to the north and the M25 to the west and south, although Virginia Water and the Wentworth Estate just beyond are also sometimes included. It has often been described as coterminous with the Borough of Elmbridge which, in 2017, had the highest number of properties above £1 million of any borough outside London. The towns of Weybridge, Cobham, and Esher at each corner along with St George's Hill and other estates around Oxshott, listed in 2007 as the British suburb with the highest price properties in The Telegraph, are commonly accepted as lying within the triangle.
