= Triangulum (disambiguation) =

Triangulum is a northern constellation.

Triangulum may also refer to:

Astronomy

- Triangulum Minus, an obsolete constellation which is part of Triangulum
- Triangulum Australe, a small southern constellation
- Triangulum Australe (Chinese astronomy)
- Triangulum (Chinese astronomy)
- Triangulum Galaxy, a spiral galaxy visible in Triangulum
- Triangulum II, a dwarf galaxy companion of the Milky Way Galaxy

Other

- USS Triangulum (AK-102), a US Navy cargo ship
- The "Triangulum" story arc, an arc found in Shin Megami Tensei: Devil Survivor 2
- Triangulum (species), species by the name 'triangulum'

== See also ==
- Triangle (disambiguation)
