= North Island =

One of the two main New Zealand islands

Te Ika-a-Māui (Māori)
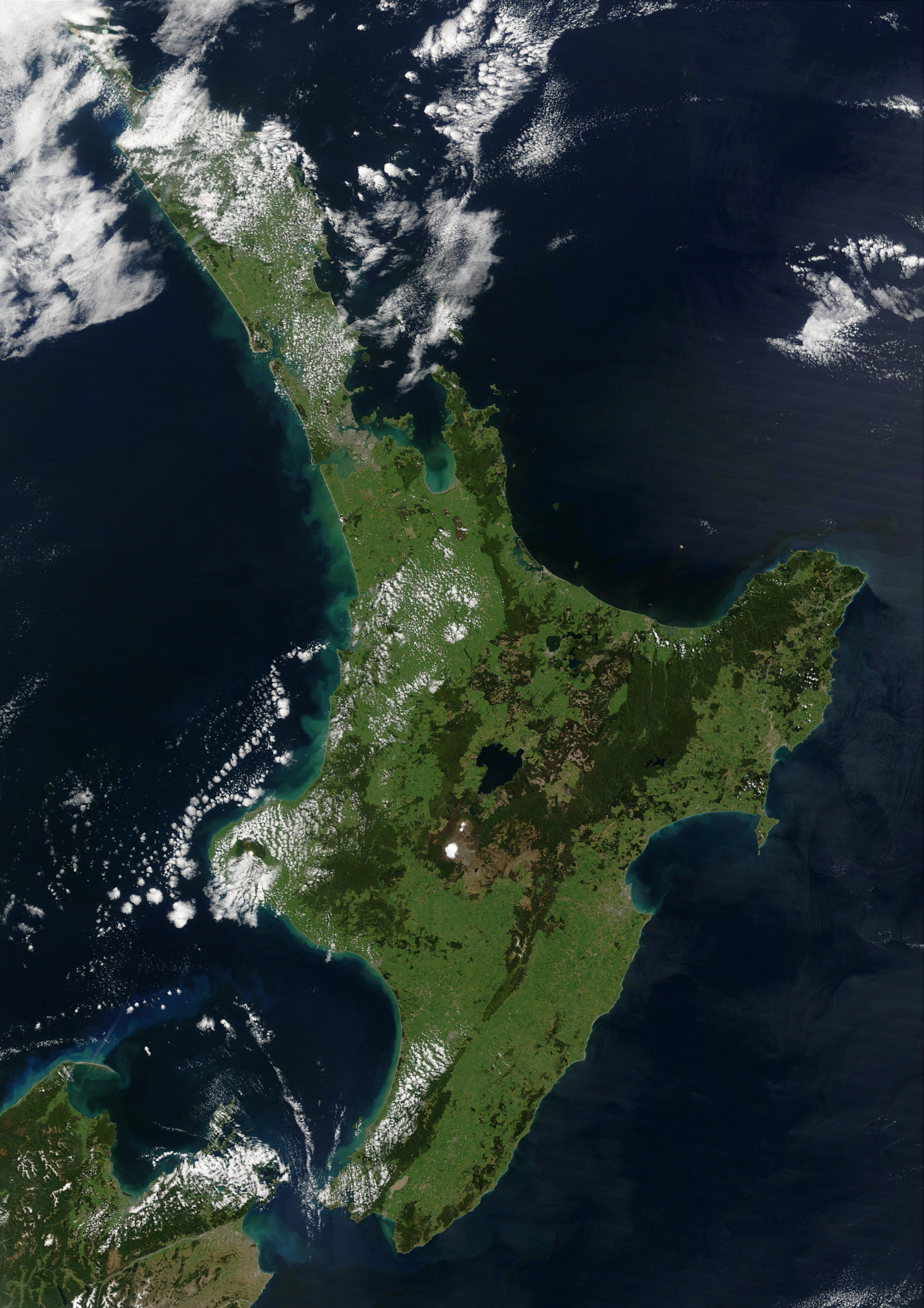
- Satellite photo, 2002

- Location within Oceania

Geography
- Location: Oceania
- Coordinates: 39°S 176°E
- Archipelago: New Zealand
- Adjacent to: Tasman Sea (west); Cook Strait (south); Pacific Ocean (east and north)
- Area: 113,729 km^{2} (43,911 sq mi)
- Area rank: 14th
- Highest elevation: 2,797 m (9177 ft)
- Highest point: Mount Ruapehu

Administration
- New Zealand
- Regions: 9
- Territorial authorities: 43
- Largest settlement: Auckland (pop. 1,547,200)

Demographics
- Demonym: North Islander
- Population: 4,067,400 (June 2025)
- Pop. density: 35.8/km^{2} (92.7/sq mi)
- Languages: English (New Zealand English); Māori (also Cook Islands Māori); New Zealand Sign; Samoan; Mandarin; Hindi; Tagalog
- Ethnic groups: European (63.1%); Māori (19.8%); Asian (19.3%); Pacific peoples (10.6%)

Additional information
- Time zone: New Zealand Standard Time (UTC+12)
  - Summer (DST): New Zealand Daylight Time (UTC+13)

The North Island (co-officially Te Ika-a-Māui (Note: Māori pronunciation: [tɛ ikɐ ɐ mɑːʉi], lit. 'the fish of Māui') from Māori) is one of the two main islands of New Zealand, separated from the larger but less populous South Island by Cook Strait. With an area of 113,729 km^{2} (43,911 sq mi), it is the world's 14th-largest island, constituting 43% of New Zealand's land area. It has a population of 4,067,400 (June 2025), which is 76% of New Zealand's residents, making it the most populous island in Polynesia and the 28th-most-populous island in the world.

There are twelve main urban areas are in the North Island. From north to south, they are Whangārei, Auckland, Hamilton, Tauranga, Rotorua, Gisborne, New Plymouth, Napier, Hastings, Whanganui, Palmerston North, and New Zealand's capital city Wellington, which is located at the south-west tip of the island.

== Naming and usage ==
The island has been known in English as the North Island for many years. The official Māori name for it, Te Ika-a-Māui ("the fish of Māui"), also has official recognition but it remains seldom used by most residents. Other Māori names include Te Ahi no Māui ("the fire of Māui", as first recorded by Captain James Cook in 1770) and Aotearoa ("land of the long white cloud"), which is more frequently applied to New Zealand as a whole. On some 19th-century maps, the North Island was named New Ulster (named after Ulster province in northern Ireland), which was also a province of New Zealand that included the North Island.

In 2009 the New Zealand Geographic Board found that, along with the South Island, the North Island had no official name. After a public consultation, the board officially named it North Island or Te Ika-a-Māui in October 2013. The official Māori name was chosen on the basis that it was "most common and consistent usage in oral tradition by Māori living on the island".

In prose, the two main islands of New Zealand are usually called the North Island and the South Island, including the definite article "the." Maps, headings, tables, and adjectival expressions use North Island without "the". It is also normal to use the preposition in rather than on, for example "Hamilton is in the North Island", "my mother lives in the North Island".

== Māori mythology ==
According to Māori mythology, the North and South Islands of New Zealand arose through the actions of the demigod Māui. Māui and his brothers were fishing from their canoe (the South Island) when he caught a great fish and pulled it right up from the sea. While he was not looking, his brothers fought over the fish and chopped it up. This great fish became the North Island, and thus a Māori name for the North Island is Te Ika-a-Māui ("The Fish of Māui"). The mountains and valleys are believed to have been formed as a result of Māui's brothers' hacking at the fish.

During Captain James Cook's voyage between 1769 and 1770, Tahitian navigator Tupaia accompanied the circumnavigation of New Zealand. The maps described the North Island as "Ea Heinom Auwe" and "Aeheinomowe", which recognises the "Fish of Māui" element. Names of certain tribes like Muaūpoko (mua upoko "front of the head") and Muriwhenua (muri whenua, "backland") also reflect the locations of their settlement in this "fish" as well as levels of seniority between tribes.

Another Māori name that was given to the North Island, but is now used less commonly, is Aotearoa. Use of Aotearoa to describe the North Island fell out of favour in the early 20th century, and it is now a collective Māori name for New Zealand as a whole.

== Geography ==
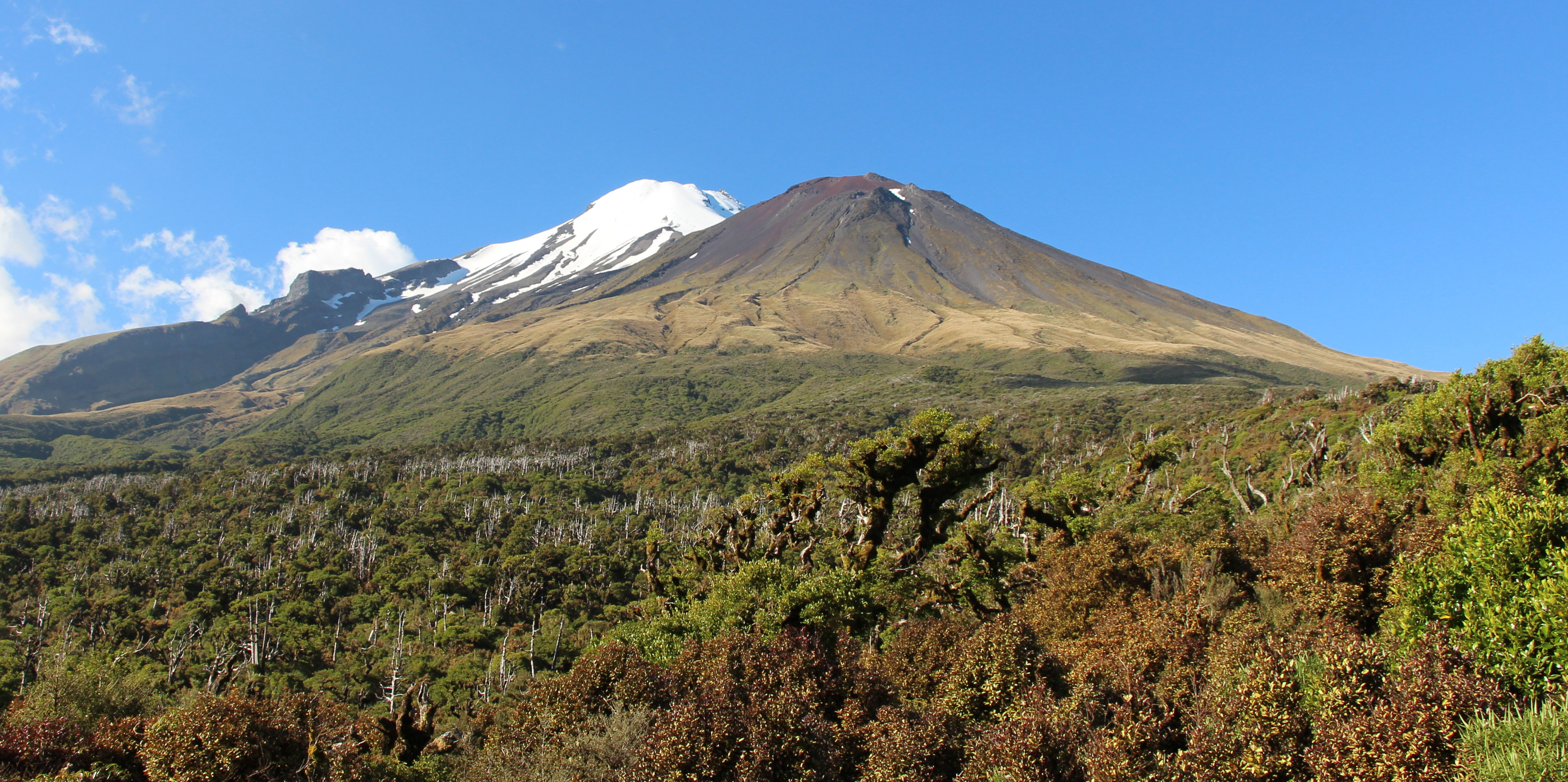
Egmont National Park

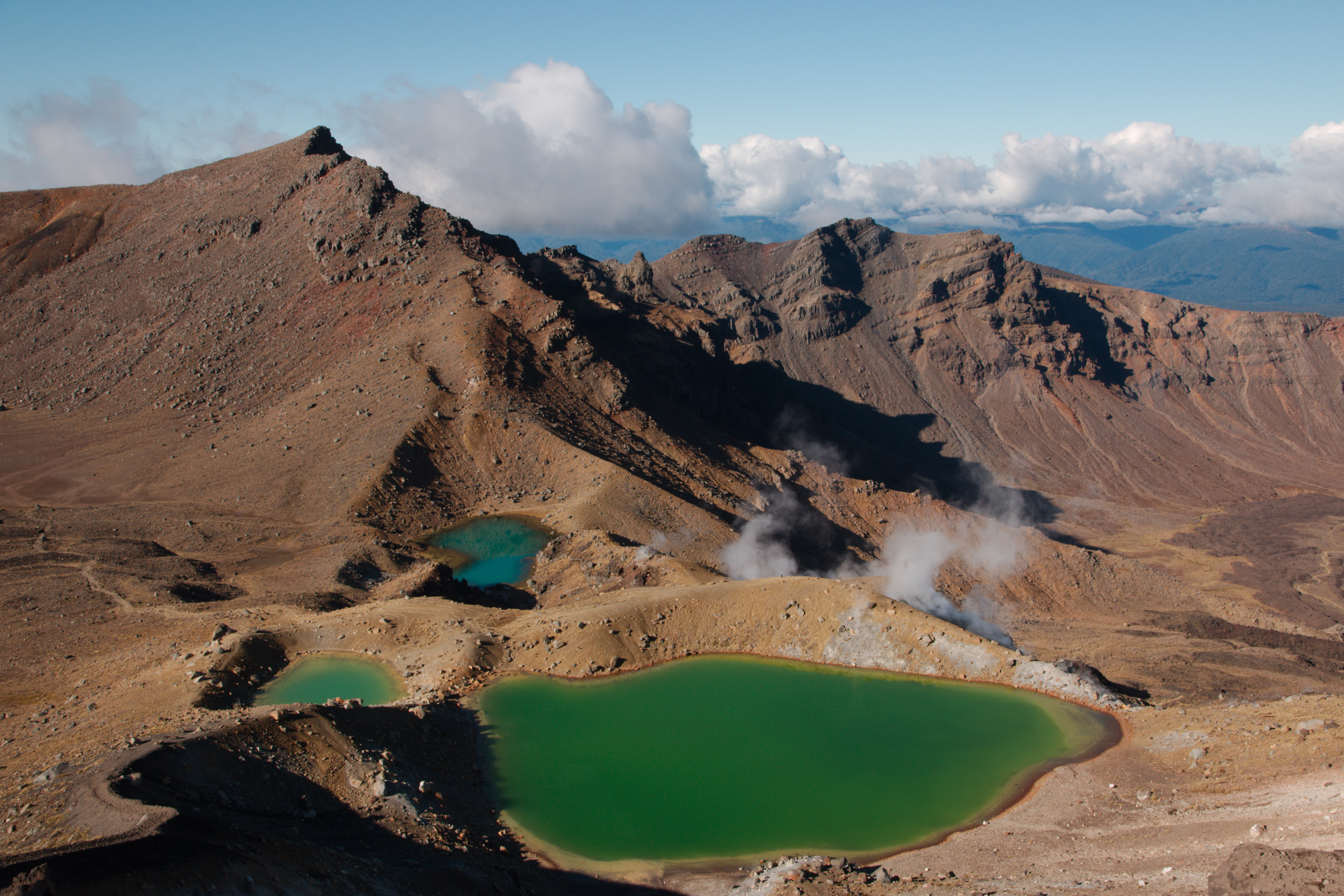
Tongariro National Park

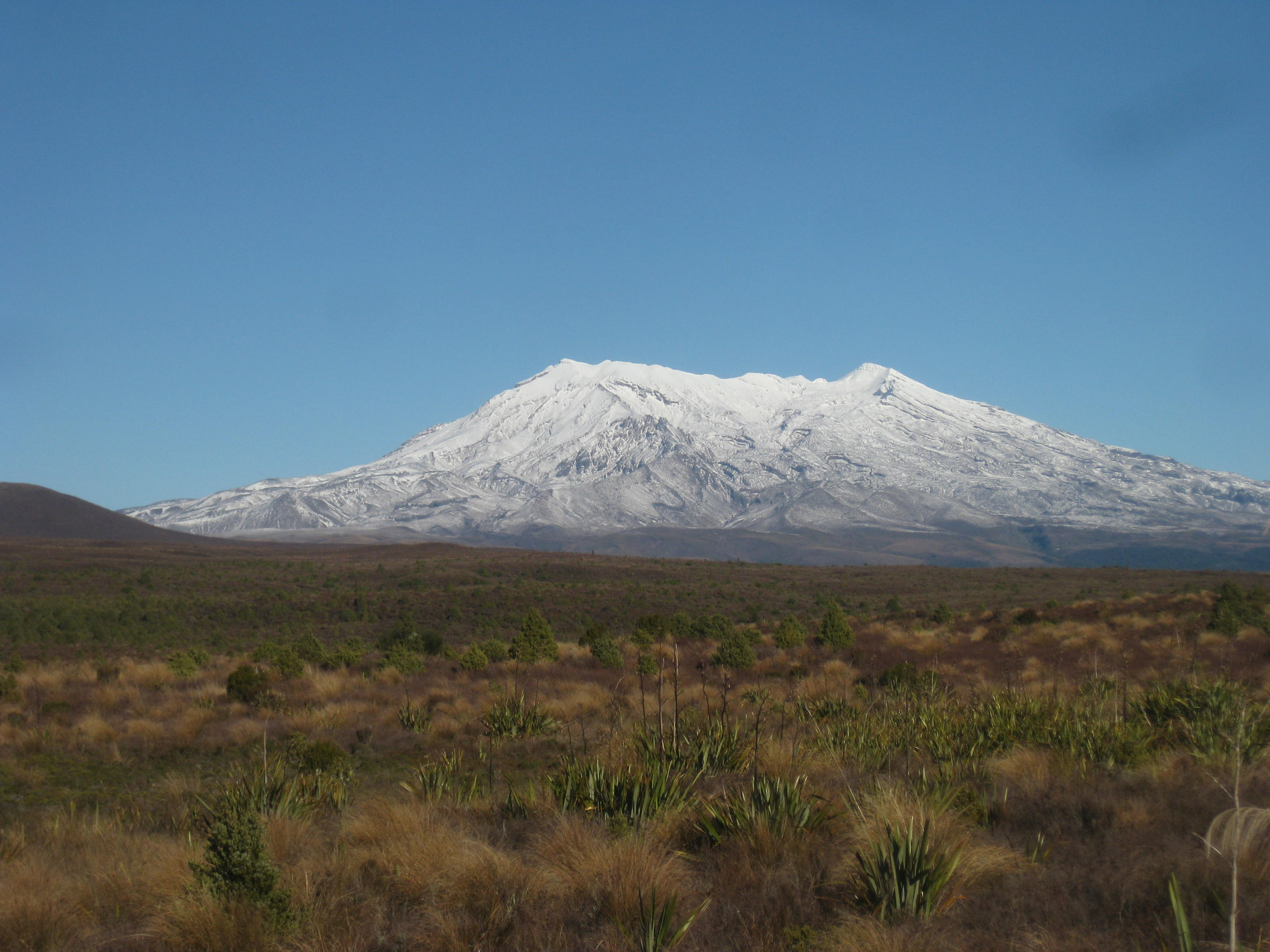
Mount Ruapehu, the highest point on the North Island

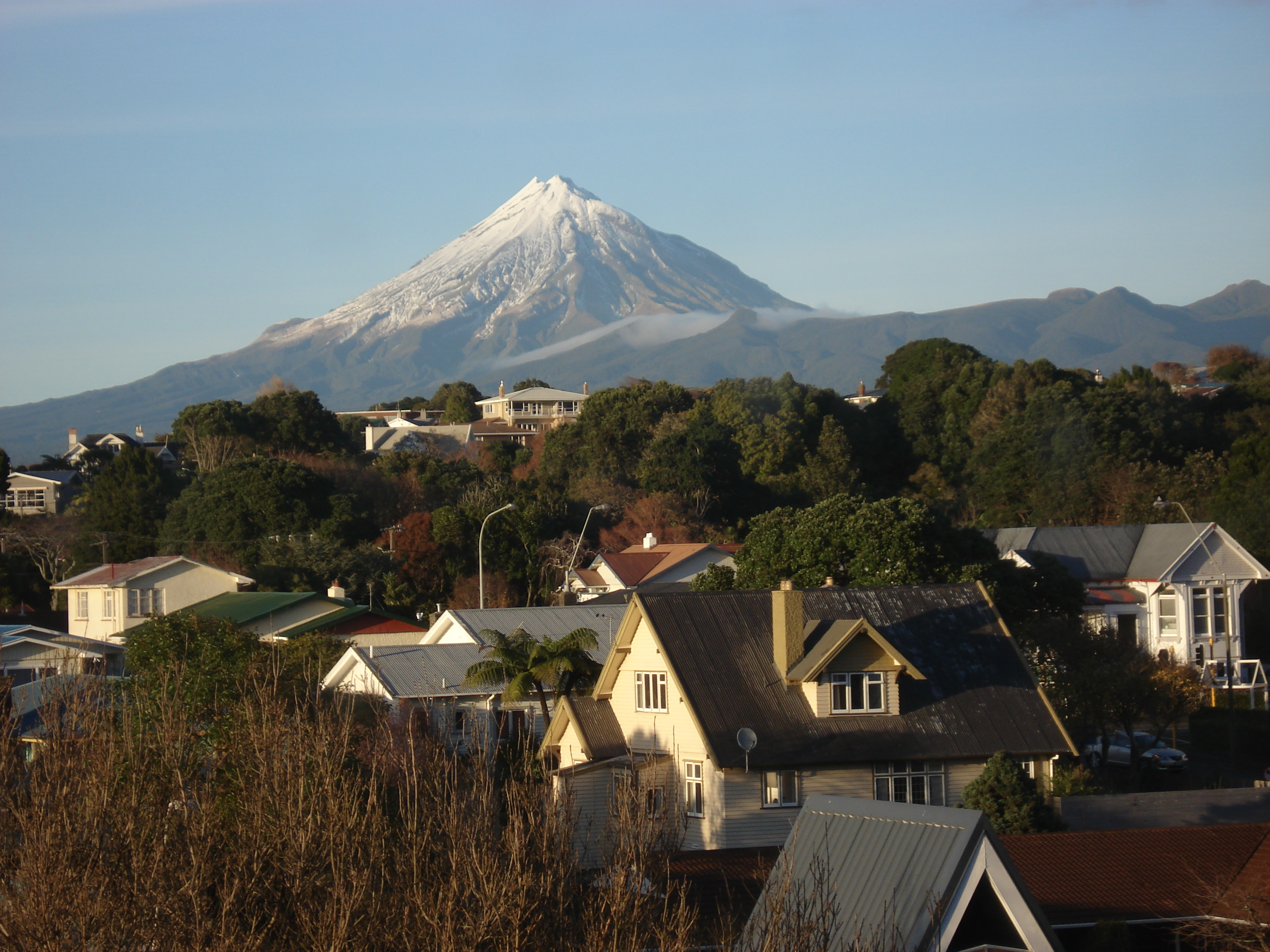
View of Mount Taranaki from New Plymouth

During the Last Glacial Period when sea levels were over 100 metres lower than present day levels, the North and South islands were connected by a vast coastal plain which formed at the South Taranaki Bight. During this period, most of the North Island was covered in thorn scrubland and forest, while the modern-day Northland Peninsula was a subtropical rainforest. Sea levels began to rise 7,000 years ago, eventually separating the islands and linking the Cook Strait to the Tasman Sea.

=== Bays and coastal features ===
- Bay of Islands
- Bay of Plenty
- Hauraki Gulf
- Firth of Thames
- Hawke Bay
- Ninety Mile Beach
- North Taranaki Bight
- South Taranaki Bight

=== Lakes and rivers ===
- Lake Taupō
- Waikato River
- Whanganui River

=== Capes and peninsulas ===
- Coromandel Peninsula
- Northland Peninsula
- Cape Palliser
- Cape Reinga
- East Cape
- North Cape

=== Forests and national parks ===
- Egmont National Park
- Tongariro National Park
- Waipoua Kauri Forest
- Whanganui National Park
- and many forest parks of New Zealand

=== Volcanology ===
- Auckland Volcanic Field
- Mount Ruapehu
- Mount Taranaki (Taranaki Maunga)
- Mount Tarawera
- Whakaari / White Island
- North Island Volcanic Plateau

=== Other ===
- Waitomo Caves
- Taumatawhakatangihangakoauauotamateaturipukakapikimaungahoronukupokaiwhenuakitanatahu

== Demographics ==
The North Island has an estimated population of 4,067,400 as of June 2025.

The North Island had a population of 3,808,005 at the 2023 New Zealand census, an increase of 213,453 people (5.9%) since the 2018 census, and an increase of 570,957 people (17.6%) since the 2013 census. Of the total population, 733,893 people (19.3%) were aged under 15 years, 743,154 (19.5%) were 15 to 29, 1,721,427 (45.2%) were 30 to 64, and 609,534 (16.0%) were 65 or older.

Ever since the conclusion of the Otago gold rush in the 1860s, New Zealand's European population growth has experienced a steady 'Northern drift' as population centres in the North Island have grown faster than those of New Zealand's South Island. This population trend has continued into the twenty-first century, but at a much slower rate. While the North Island's population continues to grow faster than the South Island, this is solely due to the North Island having higher natural increase (i.e. births minus deaths) and international migration; since the late 1980s, the internal migration flow has been from the North Island to the South Island. In the year to June 2020, the North Island gained 21,950 people from natural increase and 62,710 people from international migration, while losing 3,570 people from internal migration.

=== Culture and identity ===
At the 2023 census, 63.1% of North Islanders identified as European (Pākehā), 19.8% as Māori, 10.6% as Pacific peoples, 19.3% as Asian, 1.9% as Middle Eastern/Latin American/African, and 1.1% as other ethnicities. Percentages add to more than 100% as people can identify with more than one ethnicity.

Māori form the majority in three districts of the North Island: Kawerau (63.2%), Ōpōtiki (66.2%) and Wairoa (68.5%). Europeans formed the plurality in the Auckland region (49.8%) and are the majority in the remaining 39 districts.

The proportion of North Islanders born overseas at the 2018 census were 29.3%. The most common foreign countries of birth were England (15.4% of overseas-born residents), Mainland China (11.3%), India (10.1%), South Africa (5.9%), Australia (5.5%) and Samoa (5.3%).

=== Cities and towns ===
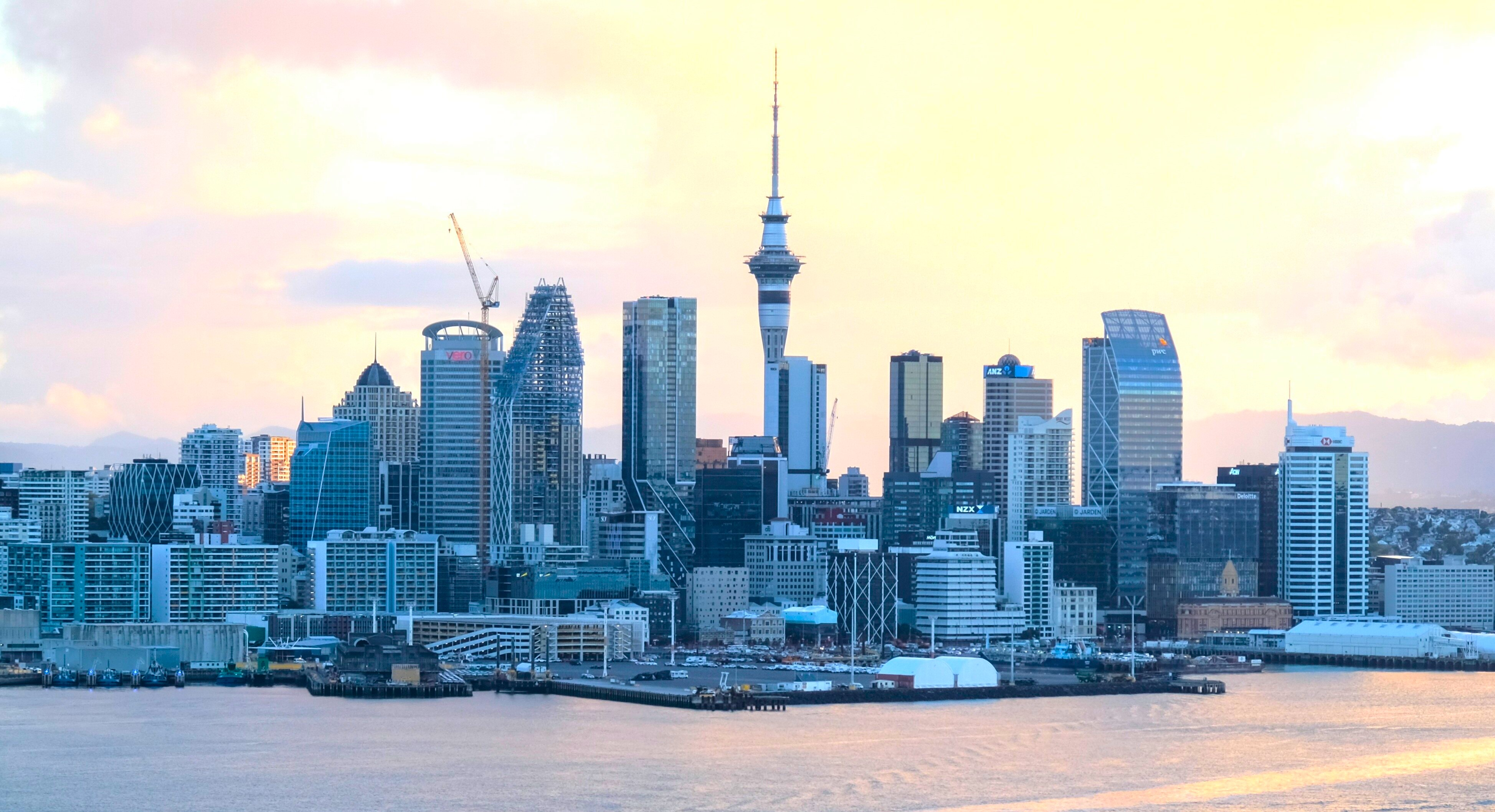
View of Auckland CBD, the largest city by urban area and population in the country

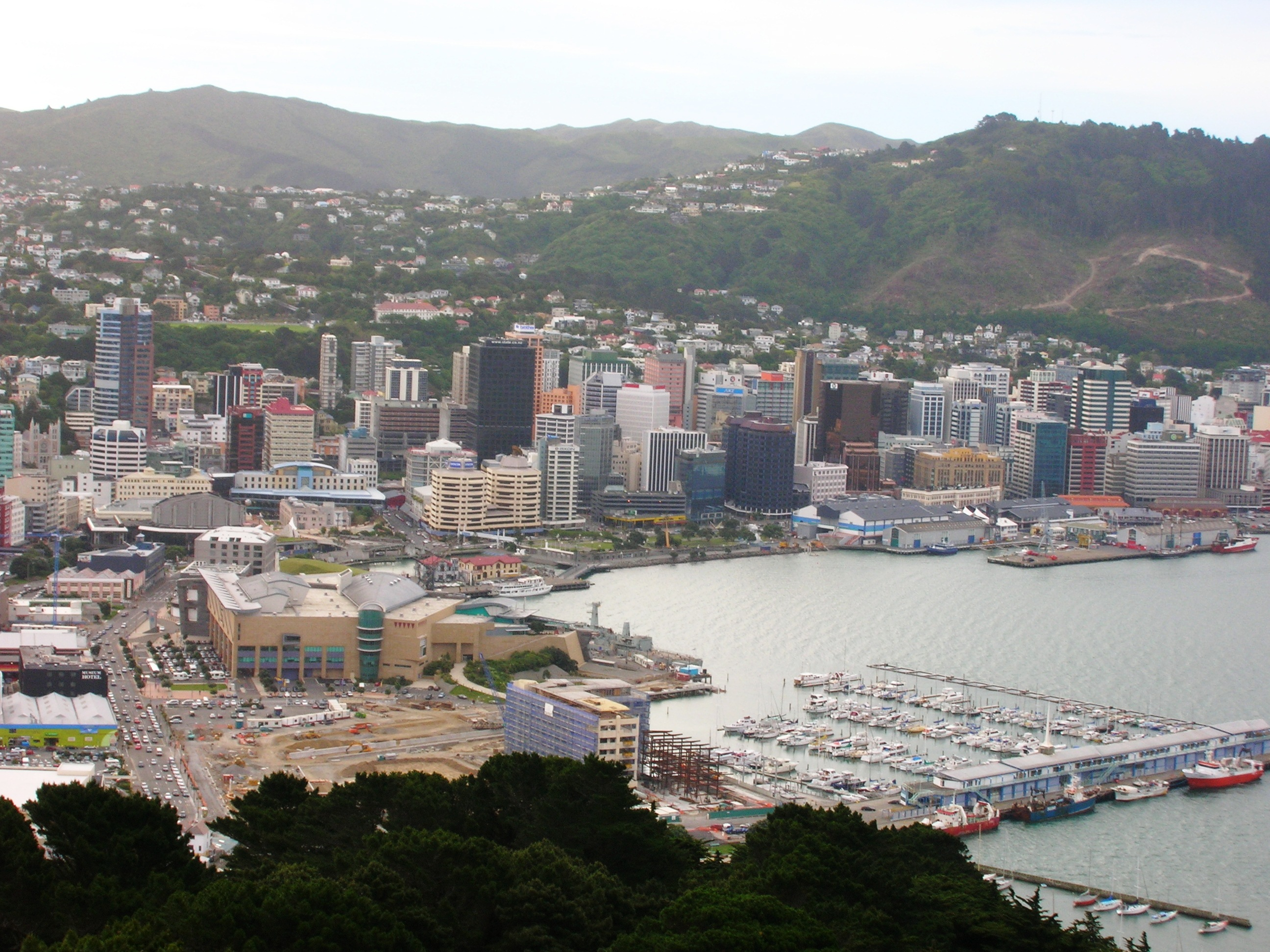
Wellington CBD, the capital and third most populous city in New Zealand

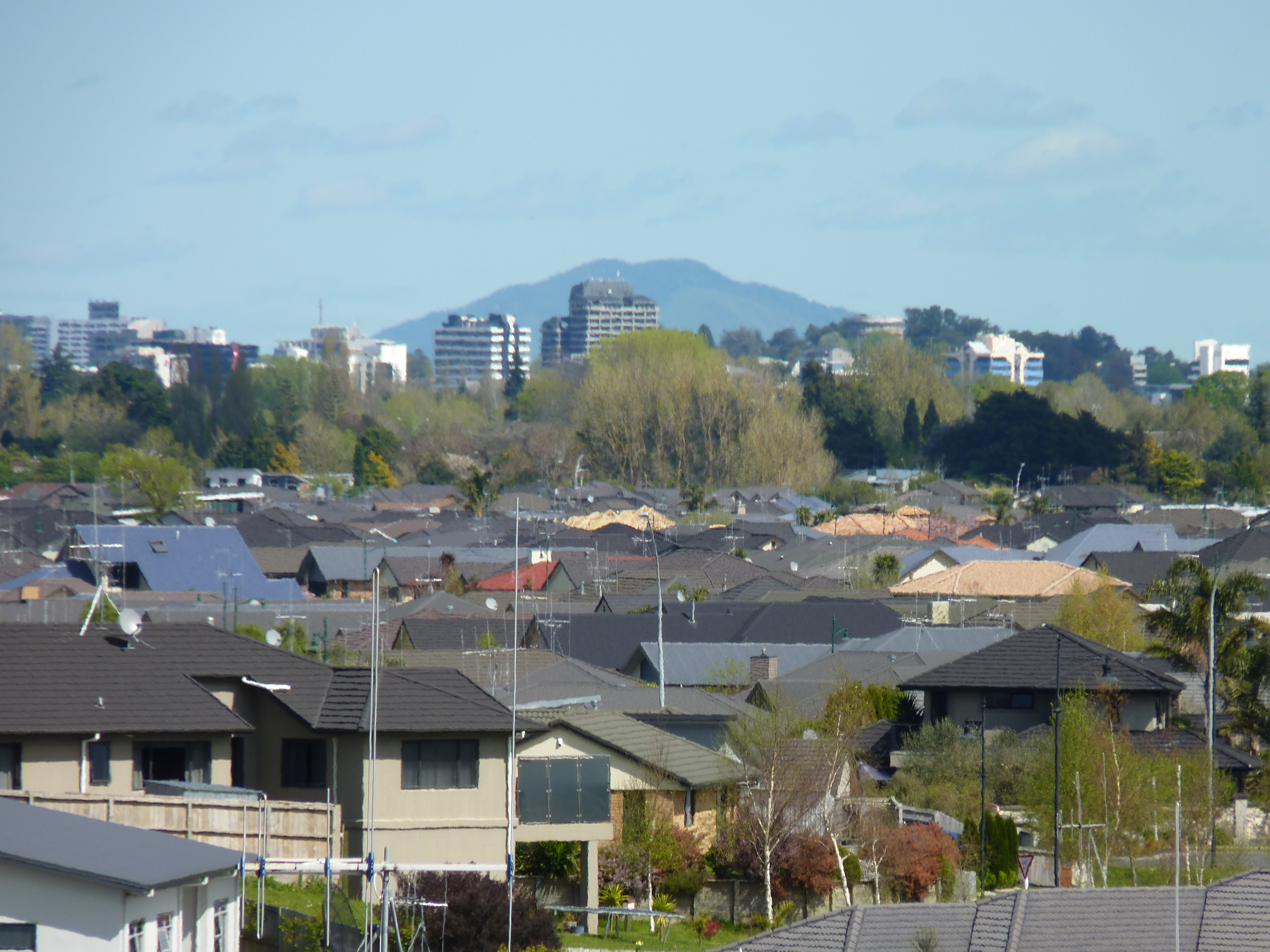
Hamilton

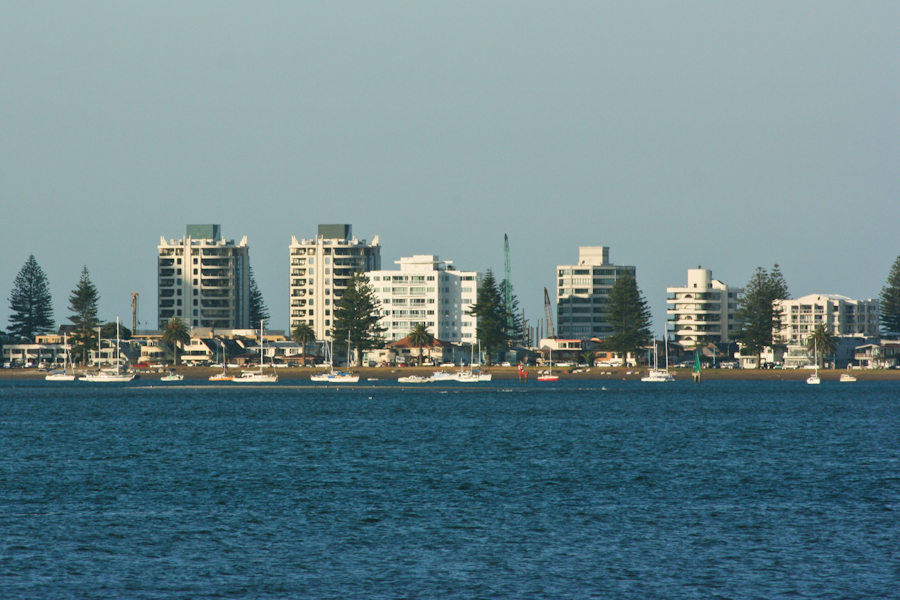
View of Mount Maunganui a suburb of Tauranga, the fifth most populous city in New Zealand

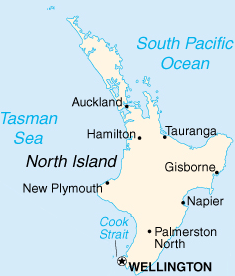
Map of the North Island showing some of its cities

The North Island has a larger population than the South Island, with the country's largest city, Auckland, and the capital, Wellington, accounting for nearly half of it. The Golden Triangle enclosed by Auckland, Hamilton and Tauranga contains nearly half New Zealand's population and a similar proportion of its economic activity.

There are 30 urban areas in the North Island with a population of 10,000 or more:

Name	Population (June 2025)	% of island
Auckland	1,547,200	38.0%
Wellington	209,800	5.2%
Hamilton	192,100	4.7%
Tauranga	160,900	4.0%
Lower Hutt	113,200	2.8%
Palmerston North	81,200	2.0%
Napier	66,400	1.6%
Porirua	60,100	1.5%
Hibiscus Coast	67,800	1.7%
New Plymouth	60,200	1.5%
Rotorua	58,500	1.4%
Whangārei	56,100	1.4%
Hastings	49,800	1.2%
Upper Hutt	44,500	1.1%
Whanganui	42,800	1.1%
Gisborne	38,100	0.9%
Paraparaumu	29,900	0.7%
Pukekohe	28,800	0.7%
Taupō	27,000	0.7%
Masterton	22,600	0.6%
Cambridge	22,700	0.6%
Levin	20,500	0.5%
Feilding	17,650	0.4%
Whakatāne	16,950	0.4%
Havelock North	15,000	0.4%
Tokoroa	14,500	0.4%
Waikanae	13,600	0.3%
Te Awamutu	13,950	0.3%
Hāwera	10,700	0.3%
Te Puke	10,400	0.3%

== Economy ==
The sub-national GDP of the North Island was estimated at NZ$ 282.355 billion in 2021 (78% of New Zealand's national GDP).

== Transport ==
=== Air ===
North Island is served by these main airports:

- Auckland Airport is the largest and busiest airport in the New Zealand, handling 18.9 million passengers in the calendar year 2025, including 8.5 million domestic, and 10.4 million international.
- Wellington Airport is the third busiest airport in New Zealand after Auckland and Christchurch, handling a total of 3,455,858 passengers in the year ending June 2022, and the third busiest in terms of aircraft movements.

There are also smaller airports in the island such as Kerikeri Airport, Gisborne Airport, Hamilton Airport, Hawke's Bay Airport, New Plymouth Airport, Palmerston North Airport, Rotorua Airport, Taupō Airport, and Tauranga Airport.

== Governance ==
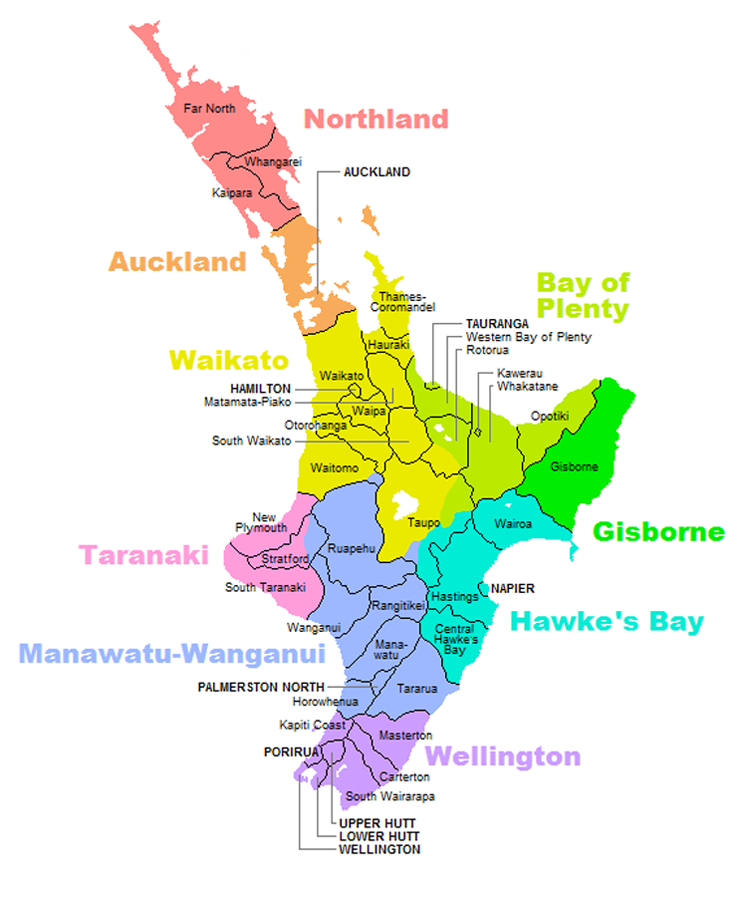
Territorial authorities of the North Island

=== Regions ===
Nine local government regions cover the North Island and its adjacent islands and territorial waters.

- Northland
- Auckland
- Waikato
- Bay of Plenty
- Gisborne
- Taranaki
- Manawatū-Whanganui
- Hawke's Bay Region
- Wellington Region

== See also ==
- List of islands of New Zealand
