= Golden Triangle (Finland) =

Region in southwestern Finland

The golden triangle is an informal Finnish-English term for the area of southwestern Finland between the cities of Helsinki, Turku, and Tampere where most of the country's population, arable land, and GDP is done.
