= Golden Triangle (Kentucky) =

Economic region in Kentucky, U.S.

Coordinates: 38°30′N 84°45′W

The Golden Triangle is an economic region in Kentucky in the area outlined by Lexington, Louisville and Cincinnati/Northern Kentucky. It contains most of the state's population, wealth and economic growth.

== Description ==
The Kentucky's Golden Triangle economic region is the triangular shaped area outlined by Lexington, Louisville and Cincinnati/Northern Kentucky. The area contains most of the state's population, wealth, and economic growth. In 2005, the Triangle had an estimated population of 2,253,876; which is 54% of Kentucky's population on 22% of the state's land area. In June 2006, the Courier-Journal reported that the Golden Triangle contains half of the state's ten fastest-growing cities. In April 2013, The Washington Post ranked schools based on an assessment of how challenging they were; nine of the top ten schools in Kentucky were in the Golden Triangle.

== See also ==
- Geography of Kentucky
- Bluegrass region
