= Golden Triangle (Yorkshire) =

Informal name for an area of West and North Yorkshire, England

A map with a broad boundary of the Golden Triangle (click to expand)

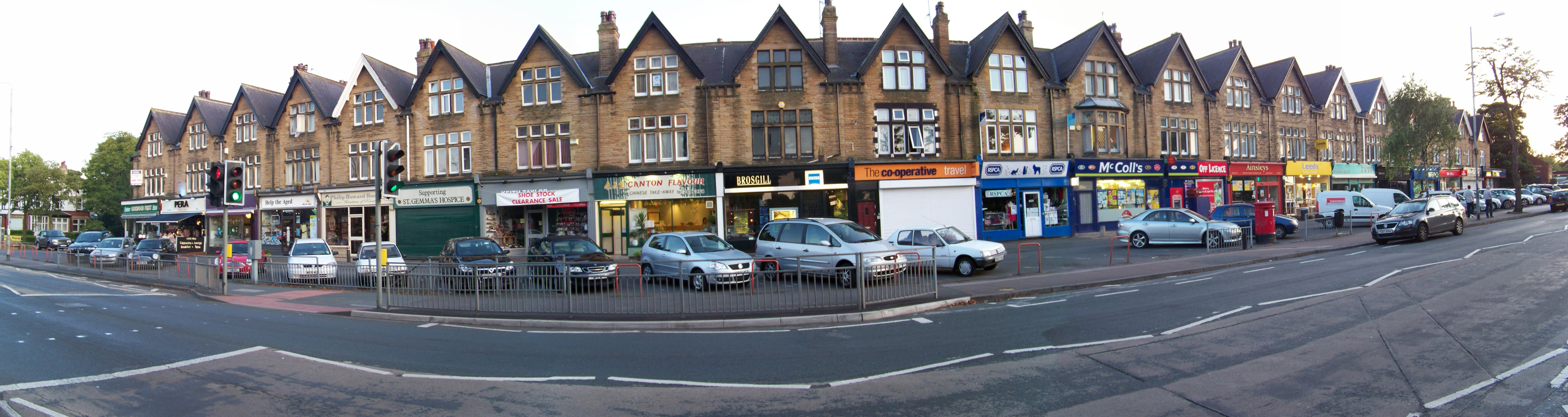
Leeds's affluent district of Roundhay, lies within the area.

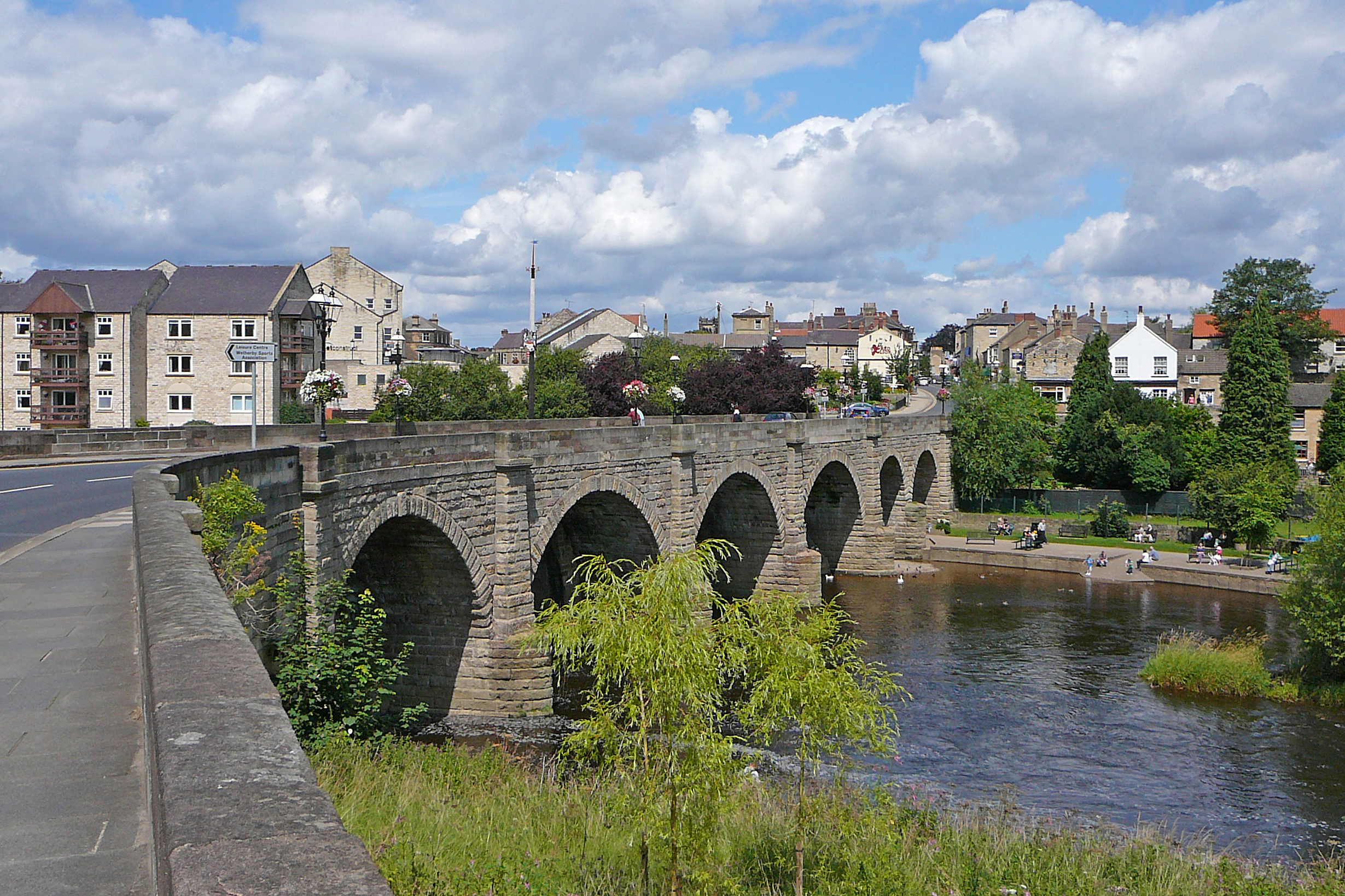
Wetherby is situated at the approximate centre of the triangle.

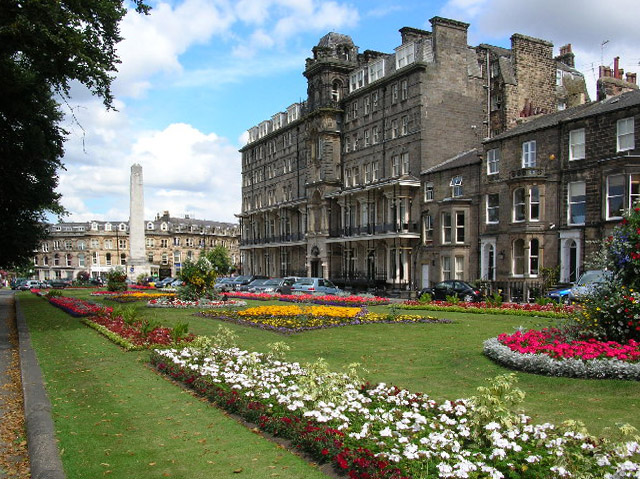
Harrogate is situated to the far north of the triangle.

The Golden Triangle is a term commonly used by estate agents for the area of West and North Yorkshire lying between Harrogate, York and North Leeds. Lying in the centre of this area is Wetherby on the fringes of West Yorkshire. Despite mainly being an affluent area the area does consist of some deprived areas such as Swarcliffe, Cranmer Bank and Hallfields. The most expensive street in the golden triangle is Fulwith Mill Lane on the South Side of Harrogate, where the average house price is £1.7 million.

== Boundaries ==
The exact boundaries are disputed, in particular around north Leeds, but the Outer Ring Road is often quoted as the boundary so that the area includes Whinmoor, Swarcliffe, Cross Gates and Garforth but not Seacroft, this definition is supported by Leeds City Council. Affluent areas such as Roundhay and Gledhow lie within the confines of the ring road, but are usually included in the area. To the north, the town of Knaresborough would also lie within the boundaries of the golden triangle.

== Usage ==
The term is mostly applied by estate agents, however, it has been used by local councils within this area and also by the local media. Publications such as the Yorkshire Evening Post, the Wetherby News and the Harrogate Advertiser have used the term on many occasions.

== Demography ==
While there have been no studies into the demography of the area as a whole. Census studies in the areas within the 'triangle', show most parts of the area have a predominantly white demographic. This remains constant irrespective of the social demographic.

The social demographic does however vary throughout the area. Swarcliffe for with a population of 6,751, of which 4,544 were considered to be "hard-pressed", or experiencing financial difficulty. Conversely Linton compromises almost exclusively wealthy professional residents.

== Housing ==
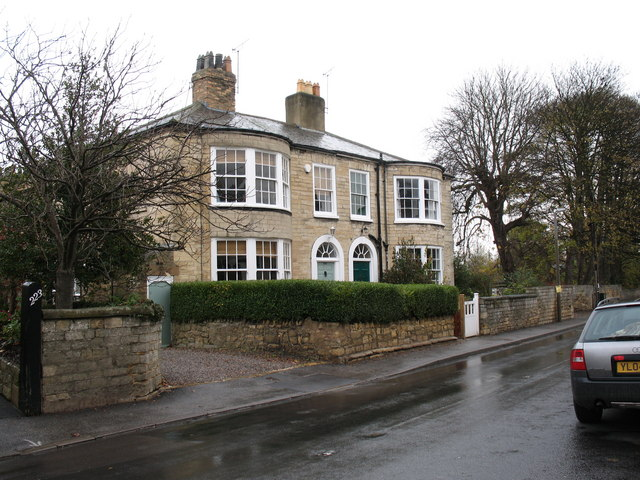
Early-19th-century semis in Boston Spa.

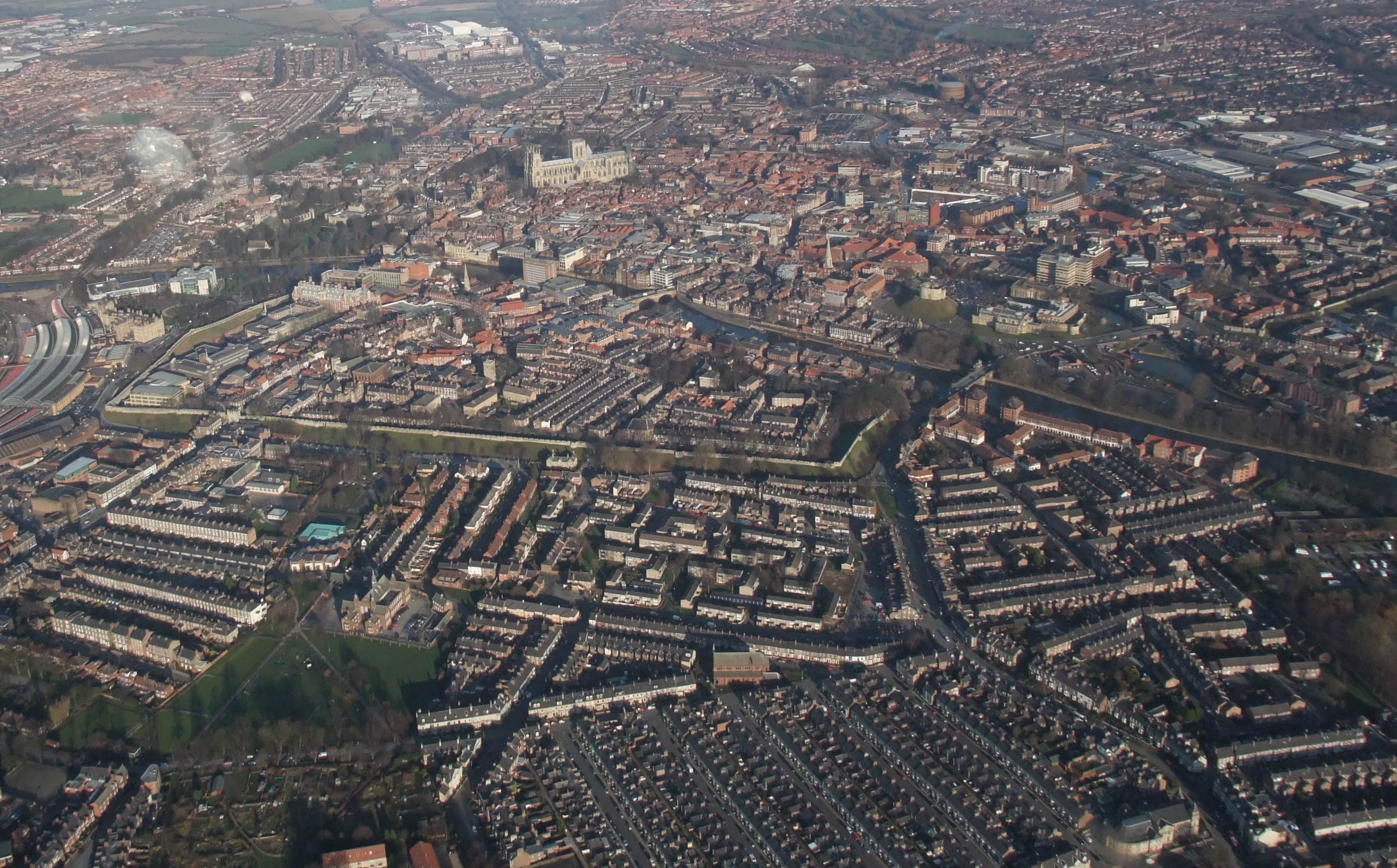
York lies to the east

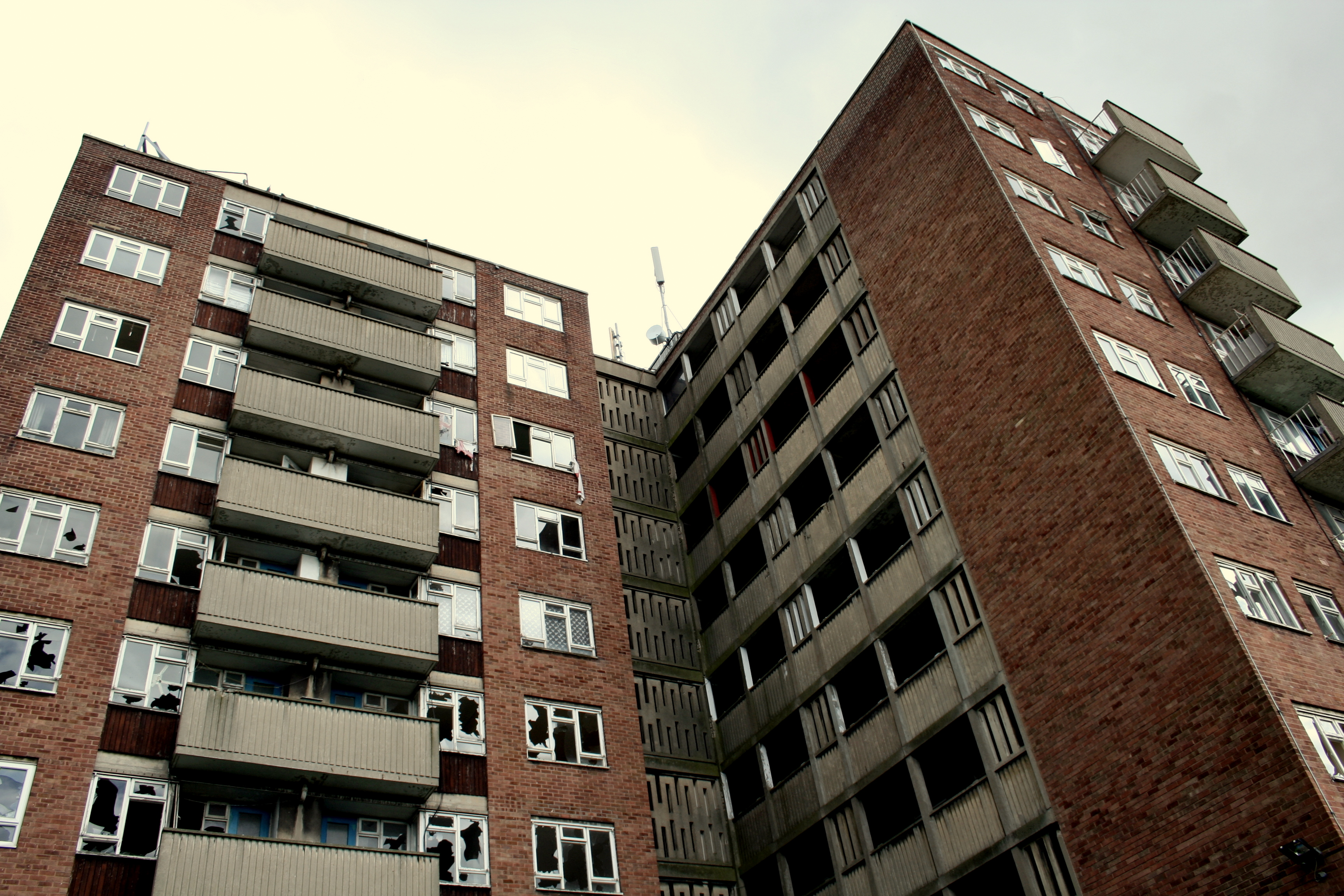
Pockets of urban decay exist within the triangle such as these flats (now demolished) in Swarcliffe.

With the exception of certain small pockets of the area, house prices have traditionally been high in the area, the price hikes in the area often being attributed to the economic growth in the commercial centre of Leeds. As a result, there has often been great demand to build housing in this area. In 2006, Leeds City Council, York City Council and Harrogate Borough Council established a programme aiming to help people afford property in the area. While house prices grew in the area during the prosperous years of economic boom, they fell in line with the rest of the country during the recession of 2008 and 2009.

The types of housing in this area vary greatly. Land scarcity and high demand have meant new developments are often of a dense nature. Recently, new proposals have been put forward to build on former green belt in this area. The building of housing on the 'Church Fields' site in Boston Spa began in 2012, and plans have also been put forward to build on fields in the Spofforth Hill area of Wetherby. For many years there has been debate about expanding the Leeds urban boundaries north along the A58 corridor towards Wetherby by building on fields around Whinmoor, Swarcliffe and Shadwell.

== Economy ==
Much of the area is commuter belt for the commercial centre of Leeds which functions as a large financial and commercial centre. There are however other buoyant industries within this area such as tourism (mainly in York, but to an extent also in Leeds and Harrogate), manufacturing (which is prevalent to the east of Leeds as well as in Wetherby and Thorp Arch) and agriculture, which exists in various areas around the 'triangle'.

=== Tourism ===
Besides the city centres of York and Leeds as well as the town of Harrogate, there are attractions in the area which bring visitors to the area such as Roundhay Park, RHS Garden Harlow Carr, The Market Town of Knaresborough and racecourses in York and Wetherby.

Leeds and Harrogate also gain visitors due to their proximity to the Yorkshire Dales national park, while York does due to its proximity to the North York Moors national park. Within the golden triangle itself, Almscliffe Crag has proved popular with hikers.

== Transport ==
The area has many road and rail transport links. The A1(M) runs through the area, while the M1 terminates in this area, merging with the A1(M). The area is slightly wider than the triangle formed by the A59, A61 and A64 trunk roads. Both York and Leeds have mainline railway stations and are linked themselves by a direct line via Cross Gates and also a commuter line via Headingley, Horsforth, Knaresborough and Harrogate. Many areas in the 'triangle' however are without rail links such as Roundhay, Gledhow, Shadwell and Wetherby. Leeds Bradford Airport lies just to the west of the area.

== Politics ==
The area does not contain any particularly safe seats for any political party. North Leeds and central York generally return Labour MPs while Harrogate has in the past delivered both Liberal Democrat and Conservative MPs and Wetherby has elected both Labour and Conservative MPs in the recent past. Leeds City Council has been led by the three main parties in its history, control of York has alternated between the Liberal Democrats and the Labour Party and Harrogate is a Conservative-Liberal Democrat battleground.

== See also ==
- Golden Triangle (Cheshire)
- M56 Corridor
- Economy of Leeds
