= Triangle Park =

Triangle Park may refer to:

- Triangle Park (Quezon City), business district in Quezon City, Metro Manila, Philippines
- Triangle Park (Lexington), a public park in Lexington, Kentucky
- Triangle Park (Newark) or Mulberry Commons, a public park in Newark, New Jersey
- Triangle Park (Dayton), a former football stadium, now a public park, in Dayton, Ohio
- Triangle Park (Huntington Beach), a neighborhood park in Huntington Beach, California
- Pink Triangle Park, a mini-park in San Francisco, California
- Research Triangle Park, a research park in North Carolina
- Triangle Park, a park in Amerikamura, Osaka

== See also ==
- Kolmikulma (Swedish: Trekanten; literally meaning "Triangle"), a park in Helsinki, Finland
