= Triangles (novel) =

2011 novel by Ellen Hopkins

- First edition
- Author: Ellen Hopkins
- Language: English
- Series: Triangles series
- Genre: Realistic Fiction
- Publisher: Atria Books
- Publication date: October 18, 2011
- Publication place: United States
- Media type: Print (hardback)
- Pages: 544
- Followed by: Tilt

Triangles is a fiction novel written by Ellen Hopkins. It is her first adult novel.

== Sequel ==
Triangles has a young adult sequel titled Tilt.

== Reception ==
Triangles has received several critical reviews, garnering positive reviews from sites such as Publishers Weekly and being one of Entertainment Weekly's "Must Pick" books. Blog Critics said that the book "is a tale that is, on the one hand psychologically disturbing, and on the other hand, a story quite beautifully written." Kirkus Reviews also reviewed the book, praising the narrative but saying "the consistently high emotional pitch, along with the constant crises, make this thick volume more soap opera than art, and the verse aspect comes to seem an affectation."
