= Golden Triangle Mall =

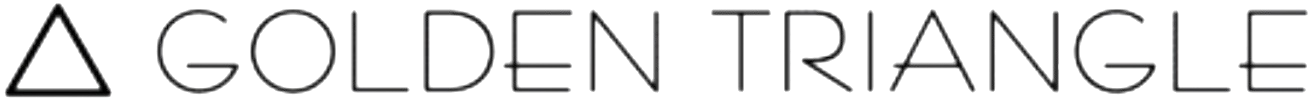

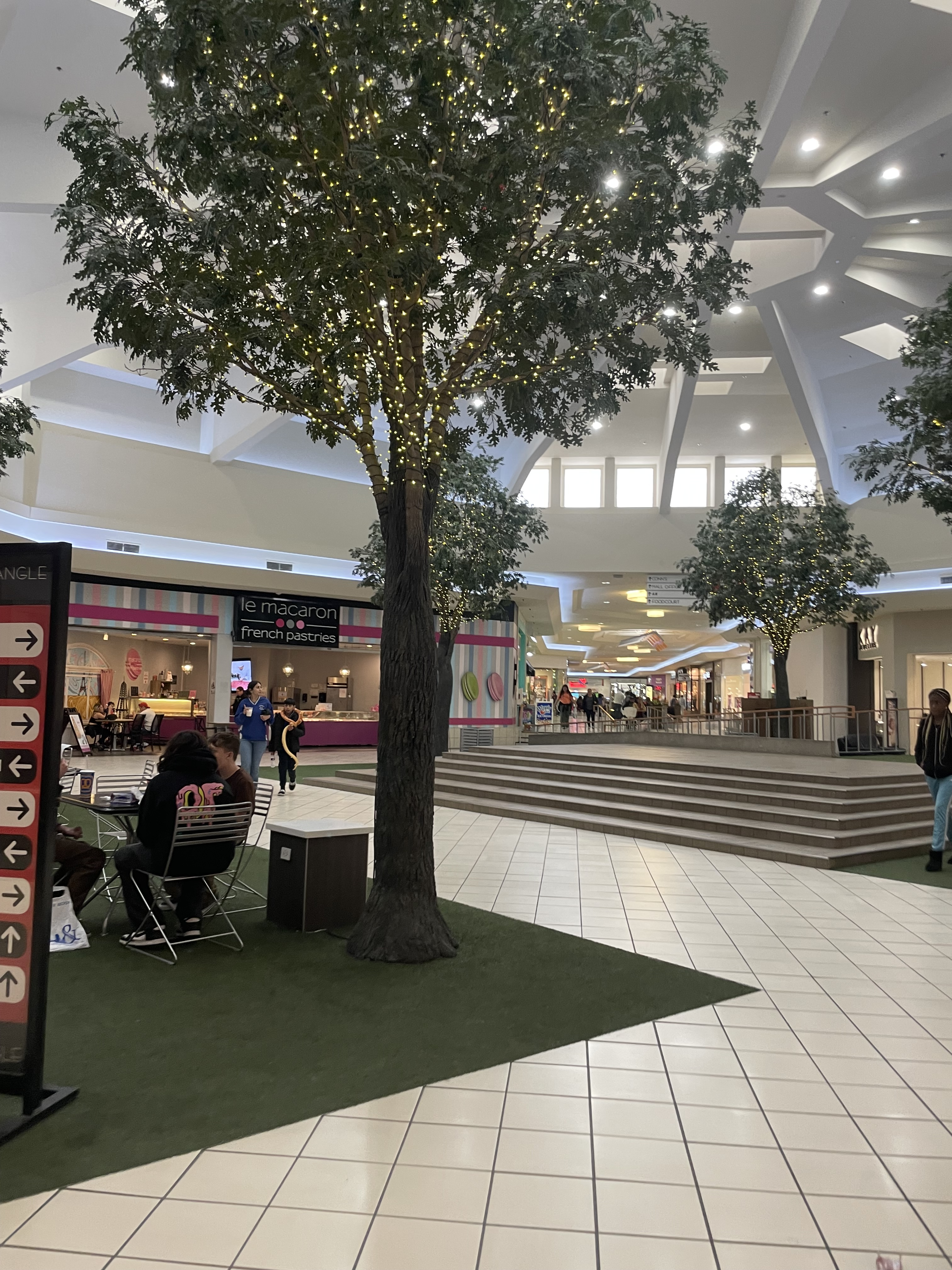
- Golden Triangle Mall in April 2024.
- Location: Denton, Texas, United States
- Address: 2201 S Interstate 35, Denton, TX 76205
- Opened: September 9, 1980
- Developer: Melvin Simon & Associates
- Manager: Cencor Realty Services; leasing agents The Weitzman Group and the MGHerring Group
- Owner: GTM Development, Ltd.
- Num. of stores: 60
- Num. of anchor tenants: 8 (5 open, 3 vacant)
- Floor area: 764,719 sq ft (71,044.7 m^{2}) total
- Floors: 1, 2 in fitness connection
- Website: shopgoldentriangle.com

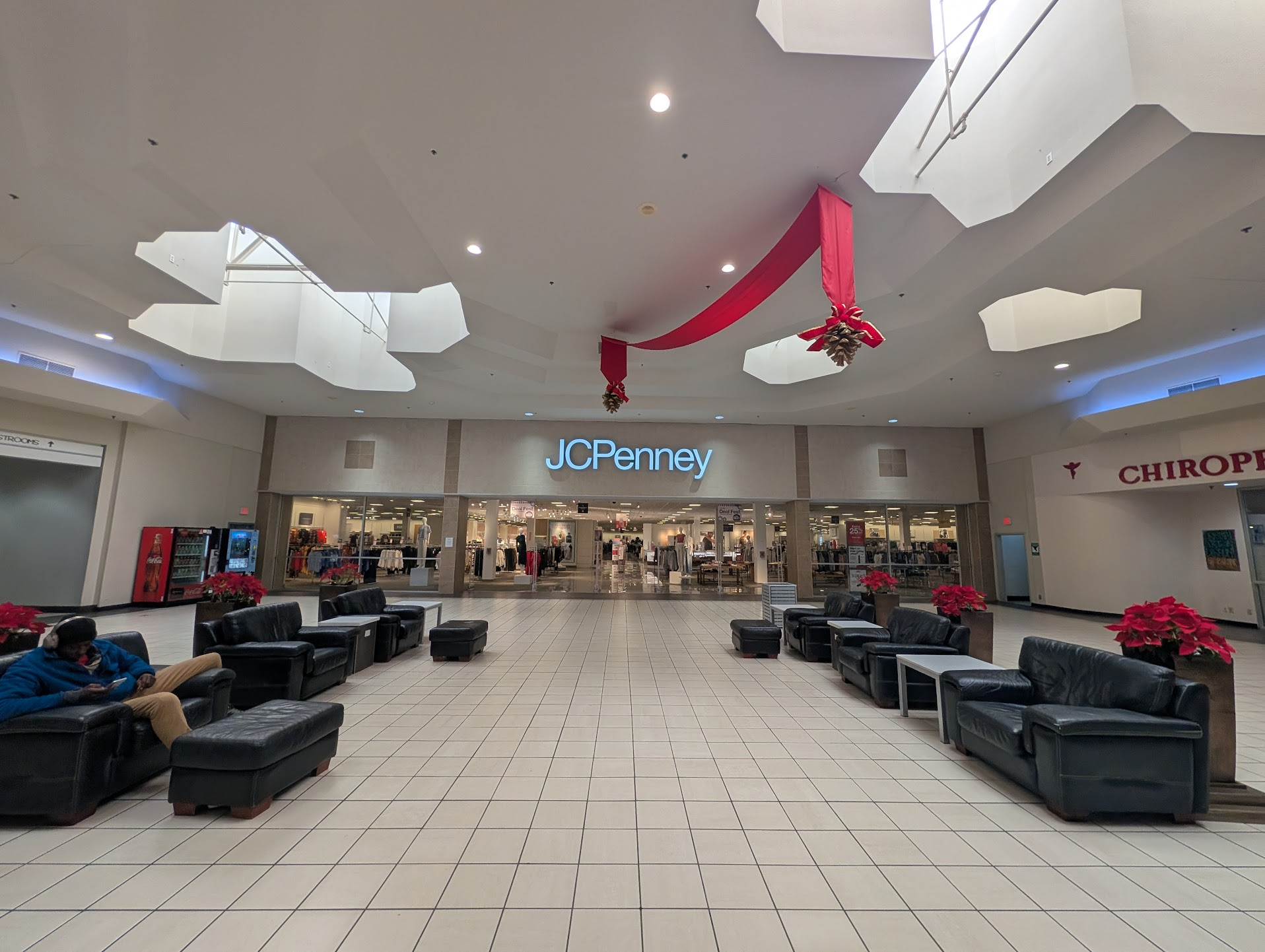
The JCPenney Court as of January 2026

Golden Triangle Mall is an enclosed, single-level shopping mall located at the intersection of Loop 288 and I-35E in Denton, Texas, United States. It contains seven current anchors, a playplace, and total leasable floor area of 764,719 sq ft (71,044.7 m^{2}) total. The anchors are Ross Dress for Less, H&M, JCPenney, Barnes & Noble, Fitness Connection, Dillard's And Floor And Decor

A major renovation began in 2012 that completely updated the mall, adding and reconstructing amenities such as a new food court, a new center court, a performance area, mall-wide Wi-Fi, and new seating areas with charging stations. The mall has since attracted new retailers, including Buckle, Charlotte Russe, Torrid, and Zumiez, and restaurants Corner Bakery, Taco Cabana, Tobu Asian, and Italia Express. The mall's retailers have also renovated their stores and storefronts, including JCPenney, Dillard's, Victoria's Secret, and Hot Topic.

In March 2015, H&M announced plans to lease a 23,000-square-foot fashion anchor space in the mall, with a location near the west entrance patio and fountain area and with exterior signage and access.

== History ==
Golden Triangle Mall opened on September 9, 1980 as the first enclosed shopping mall in Denton County. The original anchors were Sears, Dillard's, JCPenney, Montgomery Ward, H.J. Wilson, McClurkans, and Bealls. An outparcel movie theater, the United Artists Golden Triangle 4, was located across the street from the mall. The mall thrived in the 1980s, but began suffering when the much larger Vista Ridge Mall opened in Lewisville, just south on I-35E, in 1989. The mall also suffered from the low-income levels in Denton due to it being a college town. Denton Mall Co. sold Golden Triangle to Simon Property Group in 1999. In 2000, Golden Triangle underwent a $3.5 million renovation of its interior, including new floor tile, updated entrances, restroom facilities, and mall graphics.

In April 2006, the under-performing mall was sold to Feldman Mall Properties at an estimated $40 million with plans to invest over $30 million in renovations. Plans for renovations were halted due to the proposed sale of Feldman Mall Properties and the future development of Rayzor Ranch Town Center. In June 2010, lender JPMorgan Chase & Co. announced its intention to sell Golden Triangle Mall at a foreclosure auction to recoup the $25 million that Feldman Mall Properties still owes on JPMorgan's 2006 loan to Feldman. On September 1, 2010, Cencor Realty Services and The Weitzman Group took over management and leasing of the mall.

In 2012–2014, the mall was renovated, including new stores such as Buckle, Charlotte Russe, and Body Central.

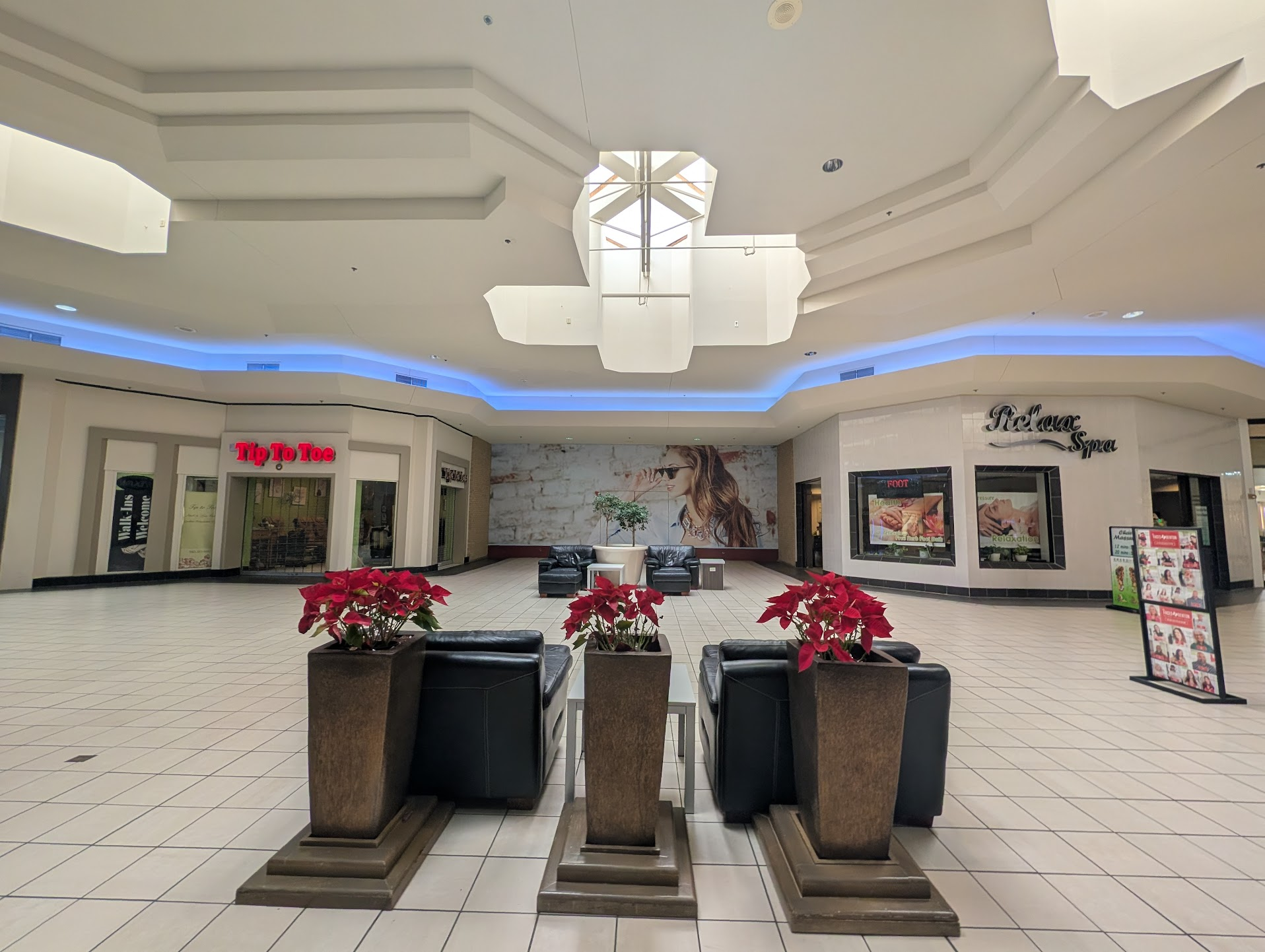
View of Former Dillard's Mens' and McClrukans Store

As of December 2024, the mall has started to see vacancy rates rise. It is unknown if this trend will continue.

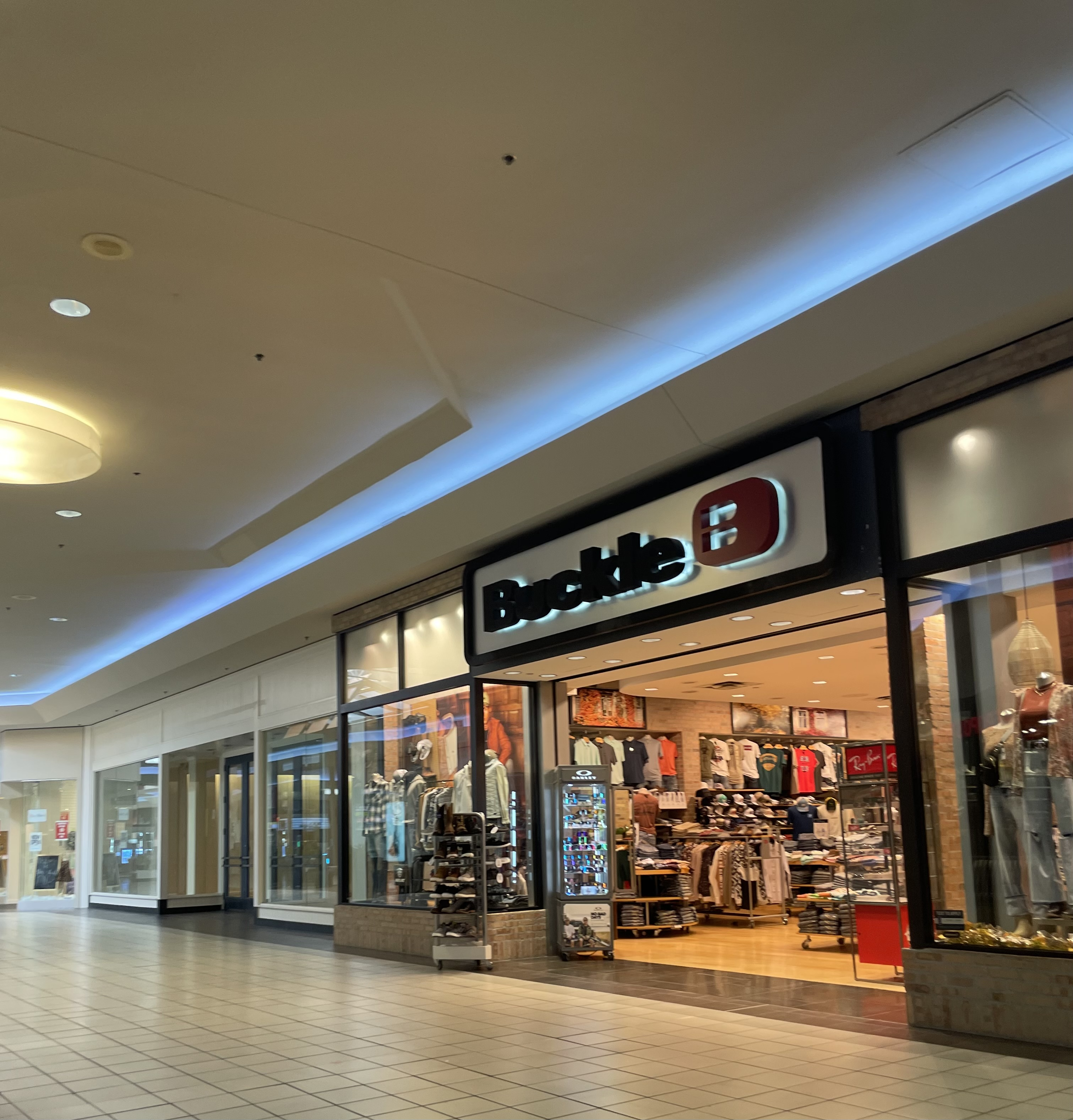
Golden Triangle Mall's vacancy rates started to climb, a vacant American Eagle Outfitters is shown to the left.

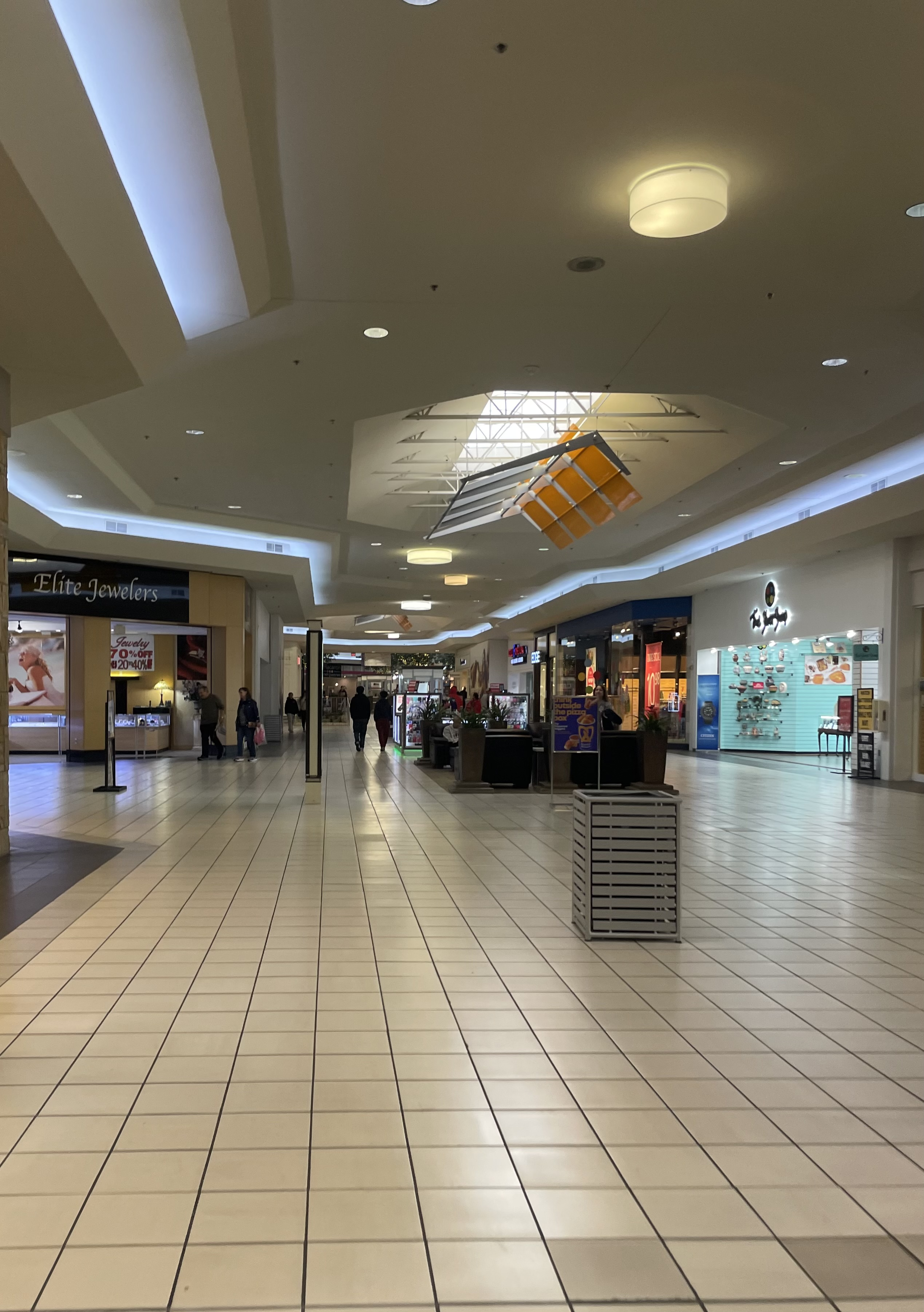
Eastern wing of the mall in April 2024

== Anchor history ==
The mall's anchors include Barnes & Noble, Dillard's, Fitness Connection, JCPenney, H&M, and Ross Dress for Less, with 3 vacant anchors last occupied by Macy's, Conns Home Plus, and Sears. Conns Home Plus And Floor And Decor was formally Sears and Macy's was formerly Montgomery Ward until 2001, then Foley's from 2003 to 2006. Fitness Connection was formally occupied by H.J. Wilson which became Service Merchandise when the Wilson chain was sold and later became DSW, while Ross was previously a Bealls and the Dillard's Men's store was Russell's until 1989. An interior United Artists Golden Triangle 5 theatre opened on March 17, 1995 with the outparcel theater closing on March 26, 2000 at the end of its lease.

In March 2015, it was announced that clothing store H&M would be establishing a 23,000-square-foot store in the mall later in the year.

Sometime in between June 2015 and April 2017, the Dillard's Men's store would close from public access.

On May 31, 2018, it was announced that Sears would be closing as part of a plan to close 72 stores nationwide. The store closed on September 2, 2018.

In August 2019, DSW announced they would not be renewing the lease on their 55,606 space opting to move to a space in Denton Crossing West. The space was then leased by Fitness Connection which opened in April 2020.

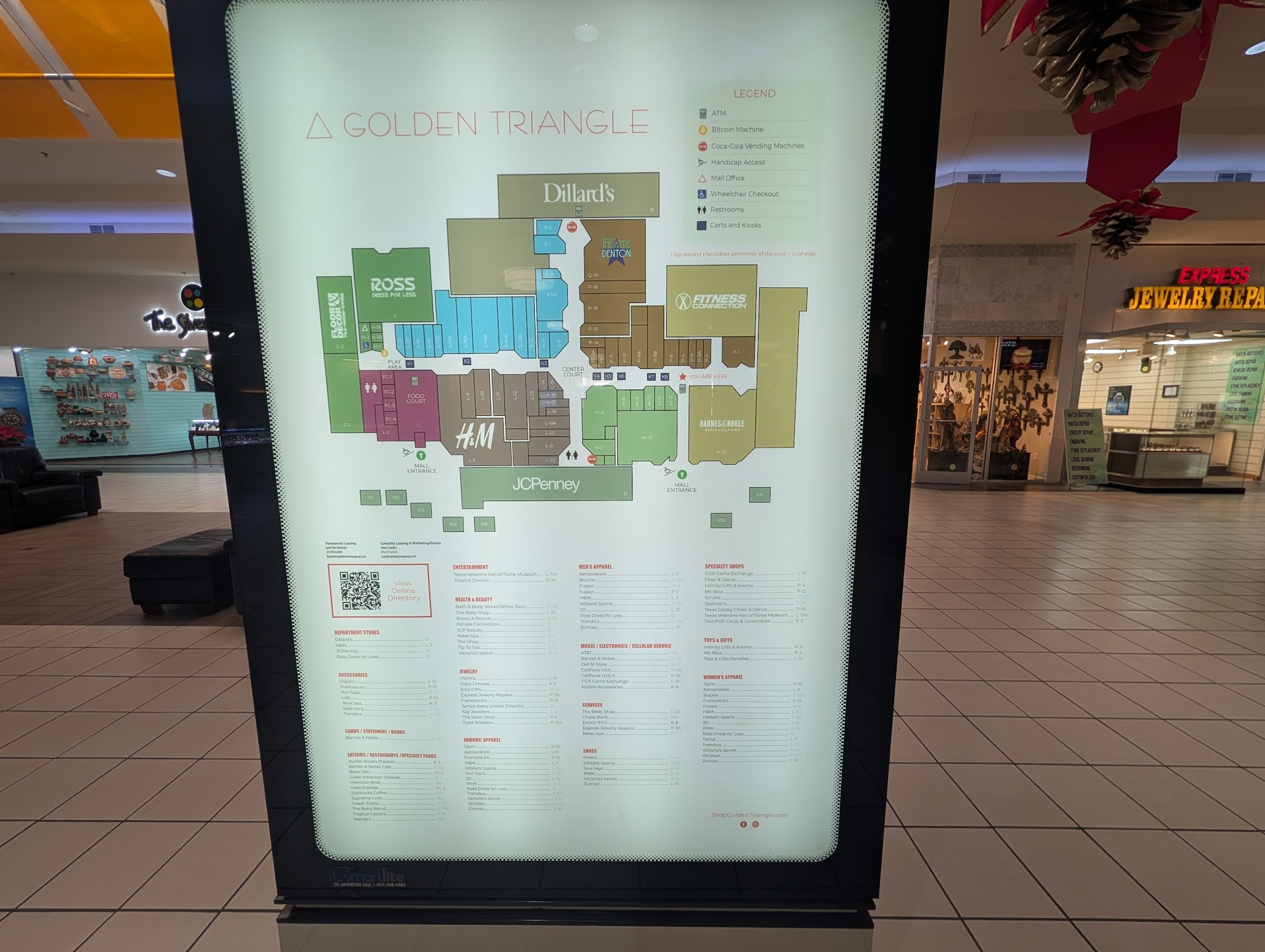
Golden Triangle Mall Directory, January 2026

In January 2020, Conn's HomePlus leased about 45,000 sq. ft. of the former Sears. The store was originally scheduled to open in April, however, due to the COVID-19 pandemic, the opening was delayed until July of that year.

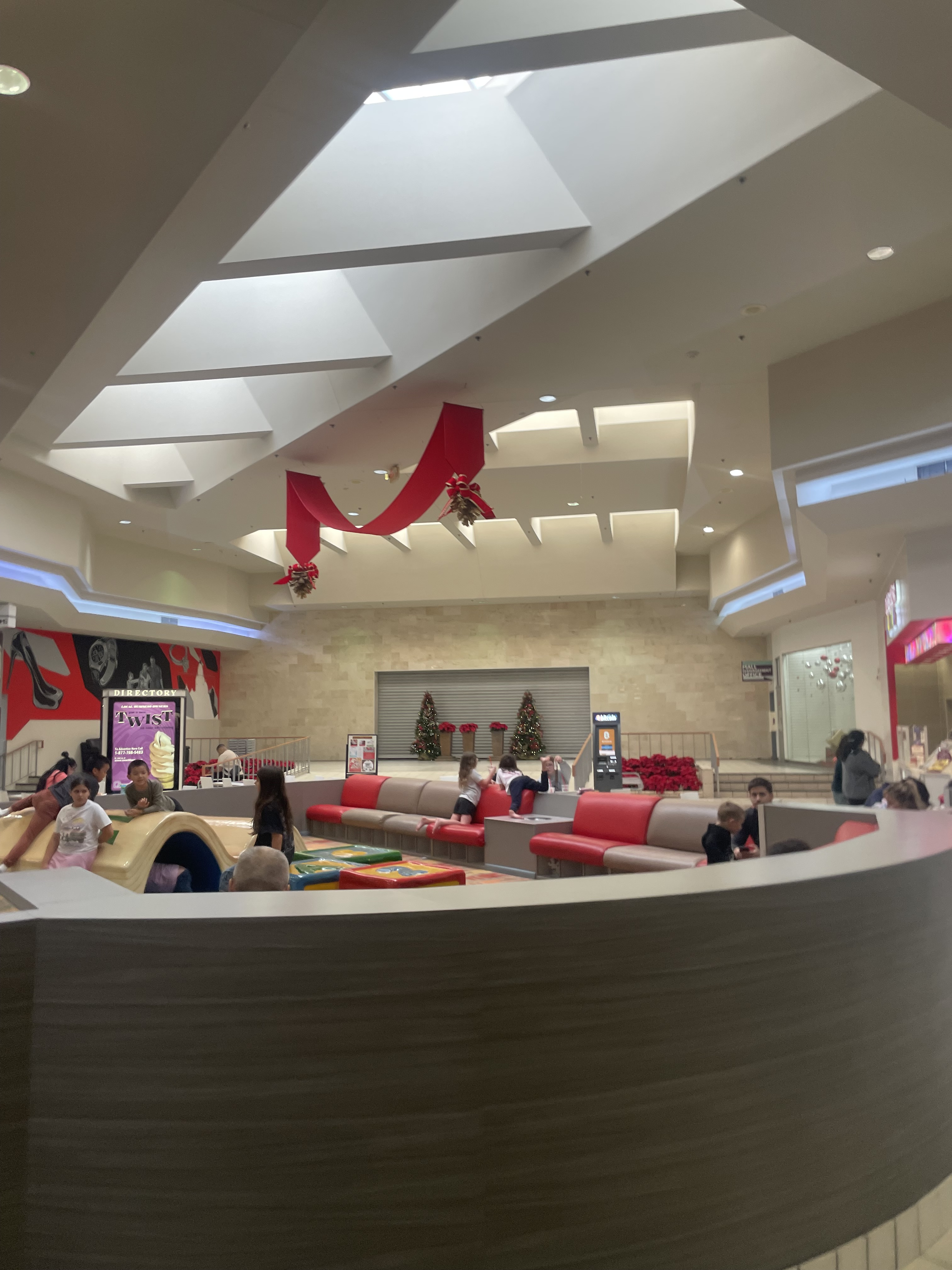
The vacant Conn's anchor at Golden Triangle Mall

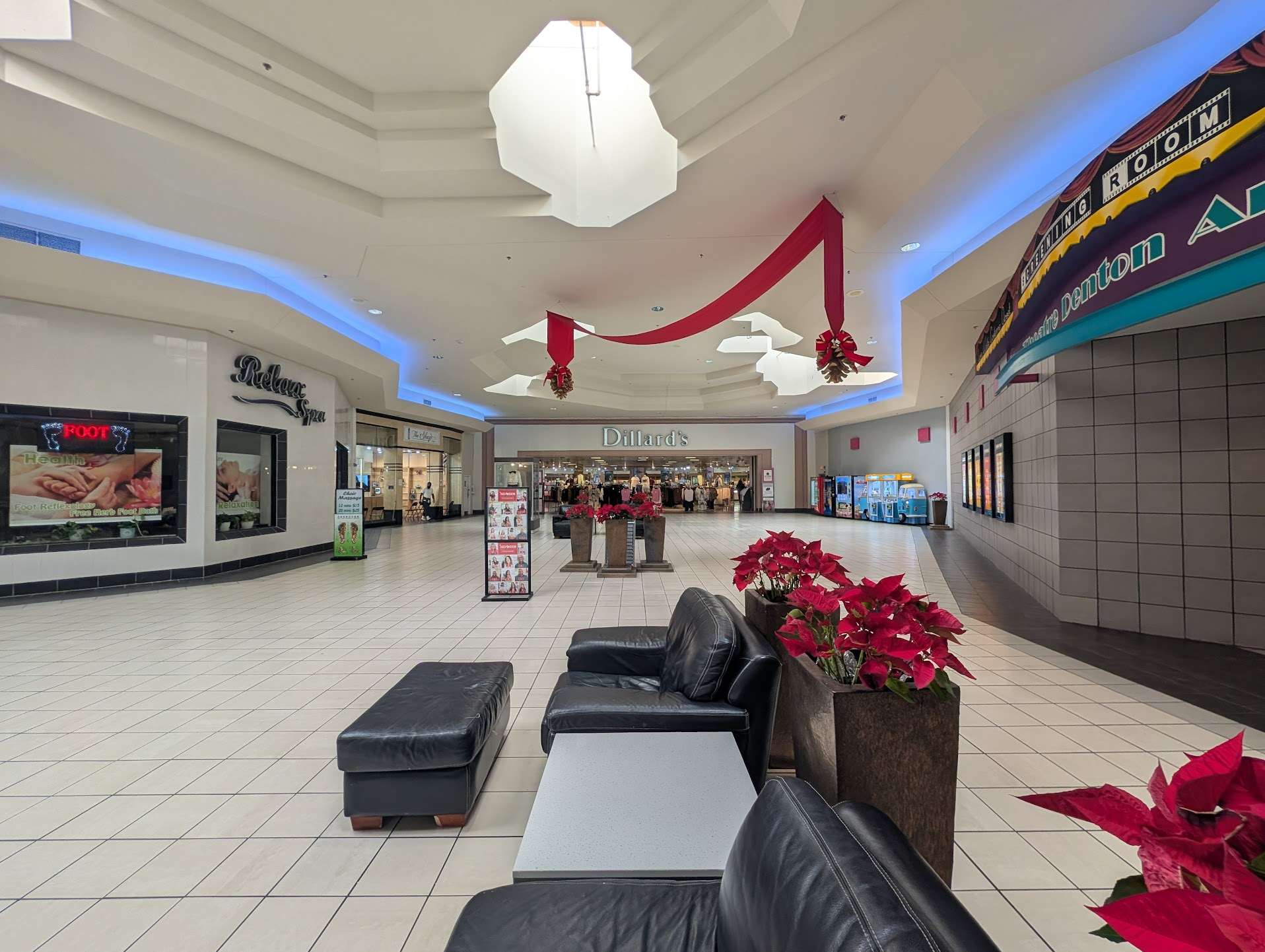
Dillard's Entrance, January 2026

On January 6, 2021, it was announced that Macy's would be closing as part of a plan to close 46 stores nationwide. The store closed permanently on March 21, 2021.

On November 22, 2021, Floor and Decor would use the rest of the former Sears space for their 10th DFW store.

In July 2024, Conn's announced that their store would be closing as a part of their Chapter 11 bankruptcy closures. A liquidation sale was hosted prior to the store closure on October 29, 2024.

In December 2024, JCPenney announced that their store inside the mall would be one of 100+ stores nationwide to be put up for sale.

== See also ==
- List of shopping malls in the Dallas/Fort Worth Metroplex
