= Golden Triangle (Rocky Mountains) =

Region of the United States known for fly fishing

The Golden Triangle is an informal designation for a region renowned as one of the premier fly fishing locations in the United States. The region is named for its approximate boundaries that form an equilateral triangle between Glacier National Park, Yellowstone National Park and Sun Valley, Idaho. Superior fly fishing also exists in the surrounding areas of the Rocky Mountains in Idaho, Montana, and Wyoming.

Because of a large number of major river systems such as the Yellowstone, Madison, Missouri, Snake, Salmon, and Clark Fork, many hundreds of fast, clear-running streams and high alpine lakes, the region contains a large number of trout. Species such as brook, rainbow, brown, cutthroat, Bull trout, and golden trout are plentiful in this area, generally wild, and range in size from a few ounces to several pounds.
