= Triangle Lake =

Triangle Lake may refer to:

- Triangle Lake (Idaho), an alpine lake in Elmore County, Idaho
- Triangle Lake, Ontario
- Triangle Lake, Oregon
