= Triangulum (species) =

There are several species names which are called "triangulum"; "triangulum" is Latin referring to triangles

- Chaetodon triangulum (C. triangulum), the triangle butterflyfish, a species of fish
- Dendropsophus triangulum (D. triangulum), the triangle treefrog, a species of frog
- Eumorpha triangulum (E. triangulum), a species of moth
- Lampropeltis triangulum (L. triangulum), the milk snake, a species of snake
  - Lampropeltis triangulum triangulum (L. t. triangulum), the eastern milk snake, a subspecies of snake
- Lambula triangulum (L. triangulum), a species of moth
- Noctua triangulum (N. triangulum), a species of moth
- Philanthus triangulum (P. triangulum), the European beewolf, a species of wasp
- Polygonum triangulum (P. triangulum), the bushy knotweed, a species of buckwheat
- Xestia triangulum (X. triangulum), the double square spot, a species of moth
