= Golden Triangle (New Zealand) =

The Golden Triangle is a geographic concept used by policy makers, economists, and the media to describe an area of high economic activity and large population based on the interconnected cities of Auckland, Hamilton and Tauranga, in the upper North Island of New Zealand. The term is not an official administrative designation, but is widely used in strategic planning and economic analysis to refer to the concentration of economic activity and population in the triangle.

Auckland has a population of 1,728,480 as of 2026. The population of Hamilton was estimated to be 192,000 in 2024, at least 75% of recent growth being due to international migration. Tauranga's recent growth has taken it to a population of 161,300. In total, the Golden Triangle has a population of roughly 2,500,000, nearly half of New Zealand's total population. In 2019, the New Zealand Government predicted that the area's population would grow by 35% in the next 25 years, and the New Zealand Herald places Tauranga as New Zealand's fourth-largest city by 2050 due to recent growth. In 2022, more than half of the nation's residential and non-residential building consents were issued within the Golden Triangle. 56% of all of New Zealand's freight movements occur within the triangle, generating half of New Zealand's GDP. As such, the Golden Triangle is a strategic region of New Zealand in regard to its trade and economic policy.

All three cities are among the fastest growing cities in New Zealand, with international immigrants choosing to work in the region for its work opportunities. Transportation initiatives and other regional development plans strengthen the potential of the region, with increased market growth due to infrastructure developments and ties between the three cities. The Golden Triangle's economic growth influences other North Island regions, as shown by market development in Hawke's Bay and Rotorua.
