= Golden Triangle (Cheshire) =

Area of affluent small towns and villages in England

Coordinates: 53.313°N 2.260°W

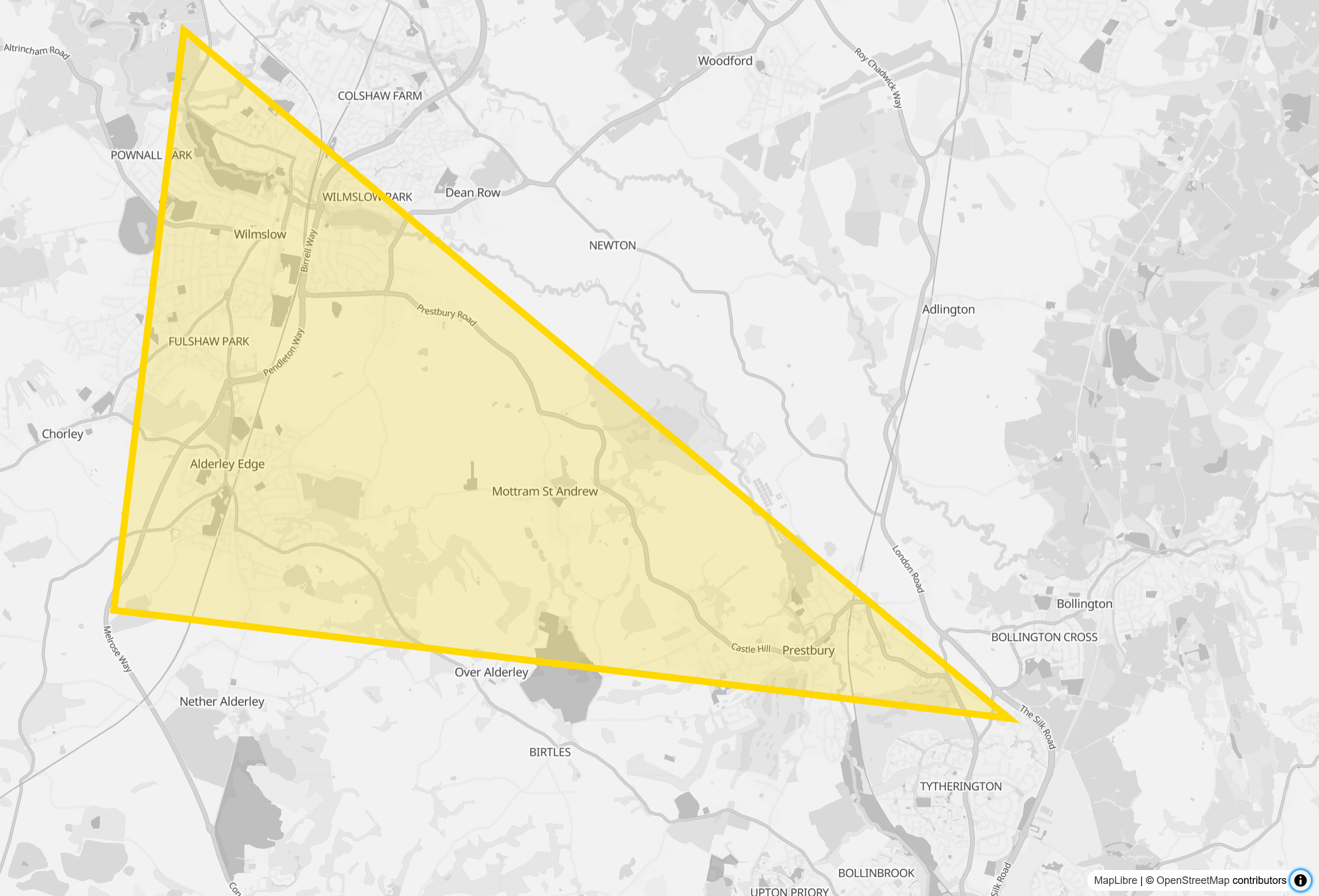
Approximate extent of Cheshire's "golden triangle" overlaid on a MapLibre rendering of OpenStreetMap data.

The Golden Triangle (sometimes called the Footballer Belt) is an area of affluent small towns and villages in Cheshire, England. The exact three points of the triangle are the subject of local debate but are generally considered to be Alderley Edge, Prestbury, and Wilmslow. The area, about 5 miles across, is noted for expensive houses in a pleasant countryside setting that is popular with wealthy Premier League footballers, entertainment industry figures, and businesspeople. Five of the ten most expensive roads in North West England have been identified as being in this area. Withinlee Road in Prestbury is also said to be the most expensive street in Northern England, with prices averaging around £1.2 million as of 2009.

The triangle is part of the parliamentary constituencies of Macclesfield and Tatton. The area and its rich businessmen were fictionalised in the eight-part drama series Goldplated. Much of the action in Howard Jacobson's novel Shylock is My Name (2016) also takes place within the Golden Triangle. It is also the main basis for the reality television programme The Real Housewives of Cheshire.

== Notable residents ==
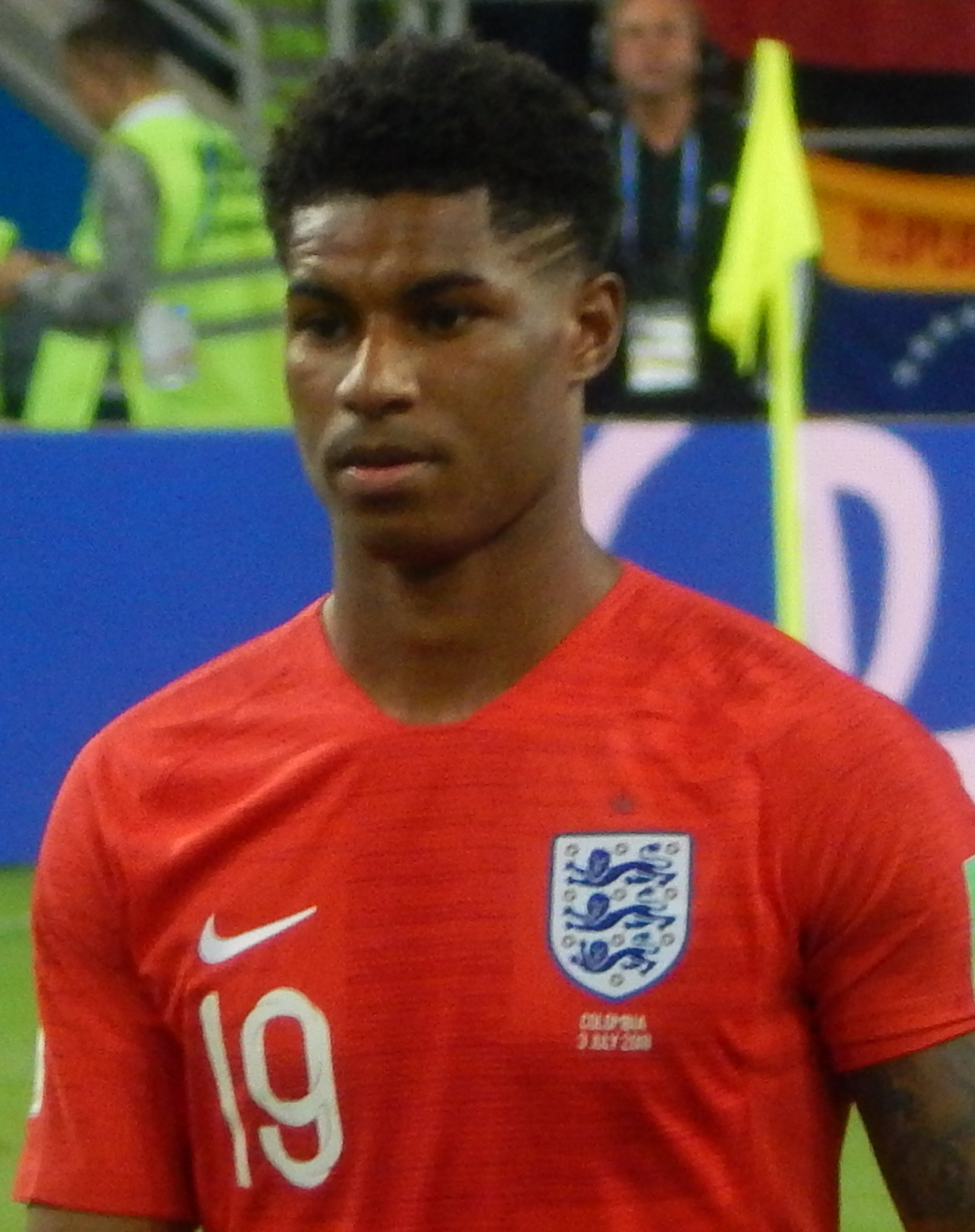
Marcus Rashford

Current and former residents include:

- Trent Alexander-Arnold, footballer
- Virgil van Dijk, footballer
- Tanya Bardsley, model and star of The Real Housewives of Cheshire and Phil Bardsley, football manager
- David Beckham, footballer
- George Daniel, musician (The 1975)
- Kevin De Bruyne, footballer
- Alan Garner, novelist
- Matty Healy, singer-songwriter (The 1975), spent his formative years in Alderley Edge, together with actor parents Denise Welch and Tim Healy
- Jordan Henderson, footballer
- Marcus Rashford, footballer
- Cristiano Ronaldo, footballer
- Wayne Rooney, footballer, and Coleen Rooney, media personality
- Raheem Sterling, footballer
- Alan Turing, mathematician
- Kyle Walker, footballer
