= Carol Wyatt =

British Painter

- Born: Carol Bernice Wyatt; 4 October 1946 (age 79); Surrey England
- Education: Wimbledon School of Art; Camberwell School of Art
- Known for: Painting, Stage Design

Carol Wyatt (born 4 October 1946) is a British artist known as a painter and for her stage designs for opera productions.

== Biography ==
Wyatt studied at the Wimbledon School of Art during 1966 and 1967 and at the Camberwell School of Art from 1968 to 1971. She was awarded the Lord Carron Prize by Sir Thomas Monnington, the then President of The Royal Academy of Art. She spent a postgraduate year in Florence, Italy where she had a successful Exhibition at the Arnacci Gallery of her paper cut-outs in 1972. She has taught at various art schools, particularly Camberwell School of Art and Saint Martin's School of Art at graduate level and at the Edinburgh College of Art at postgraduate level.

Wyatt's work is featured in numerous collections including those of the Arts Council of Great Britain, De Beers, The Cocoa Merchants, Unilever, Save and Prosper PLC, Tate and Lyle and various other company collections. New Walk Museum Gulbenkian Purchase Award, Towner Gallery and important collections in England, United States, Italy, France and Switzerland.

Various mixed and one person shows soon led to Wyatt's first one-person museum tour in 1980–1981 culminating at Gainsborough's House, Sudbury. In 1988, her work was included in The Romantic Tradition in Contemporary British Painting with John Bellany, Alan Davie, Christopher le Brun, Thérèse Oulton, Michael Porter and Lance Smith which toured Spanish Museums and was curated by Keith Patrick.

Her work is much connected with theatre and opera, referring to Bel Canto, Debussy and Tarkovsky. She worked with the late Tito Gobbi on sets and costumes for his opera summer schools in Florence at the Villa Schifanoia. She instigated the revival of De Chirico's sets and costumes for Bellini's Puritani for the Maggio Musicale. She continues her work as a fine artist as well as respected theatrical set and costume designer.

== See also ==
- A Checklist of Painters c1200-1994
