= Russell Hill (artist) =

- Born: 27 August 1988 (age 37); Rugby, Warwickshire
- Education: Wimbledon College of Art Royal College of Art
- Known for: Sculpture, Installation
- Awards: Catlin Art Prize Winner

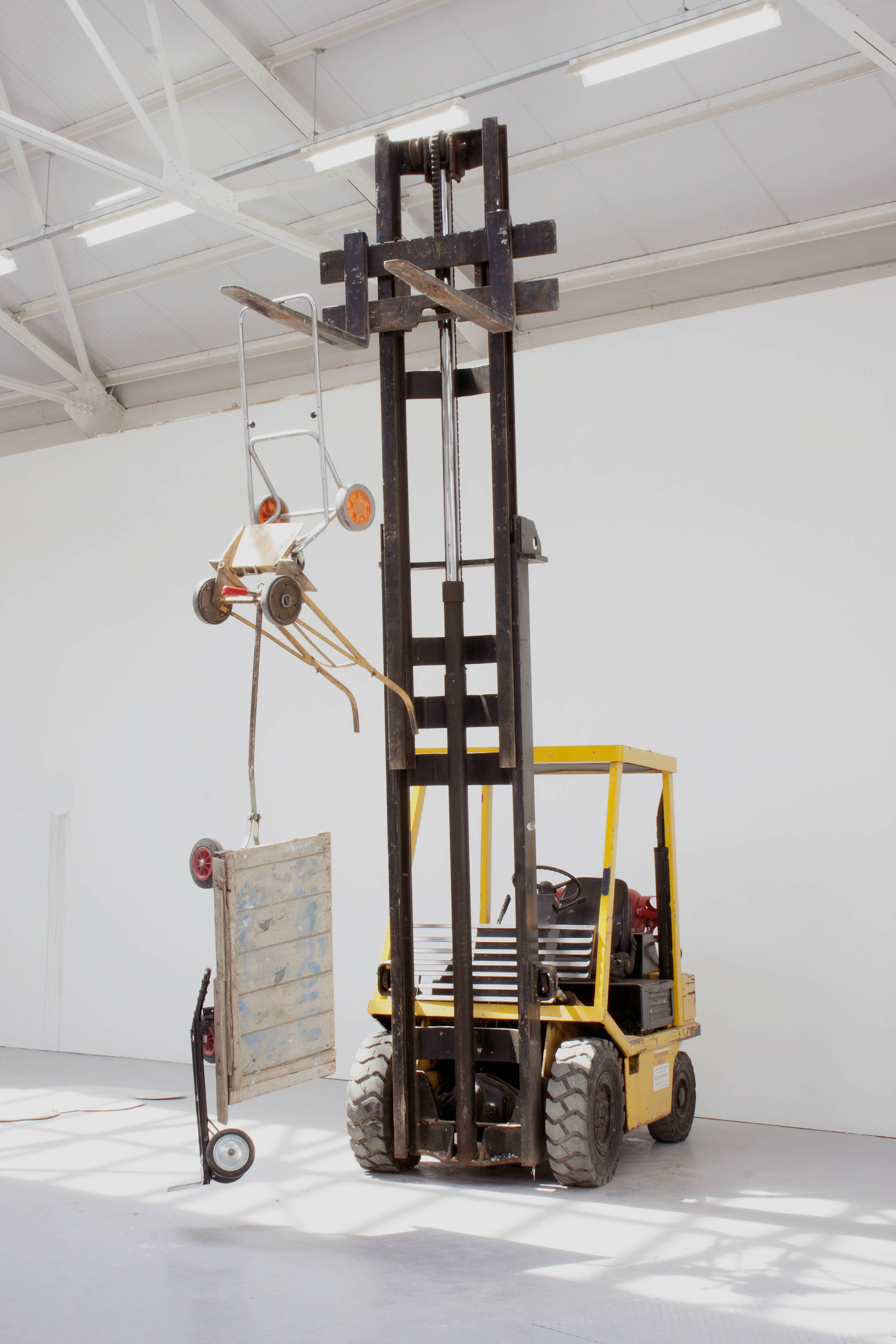
Fork Lift, 2013, an installation by artist Russell Hill using a fork lift and lifting apparatus at the Royal College of Art.

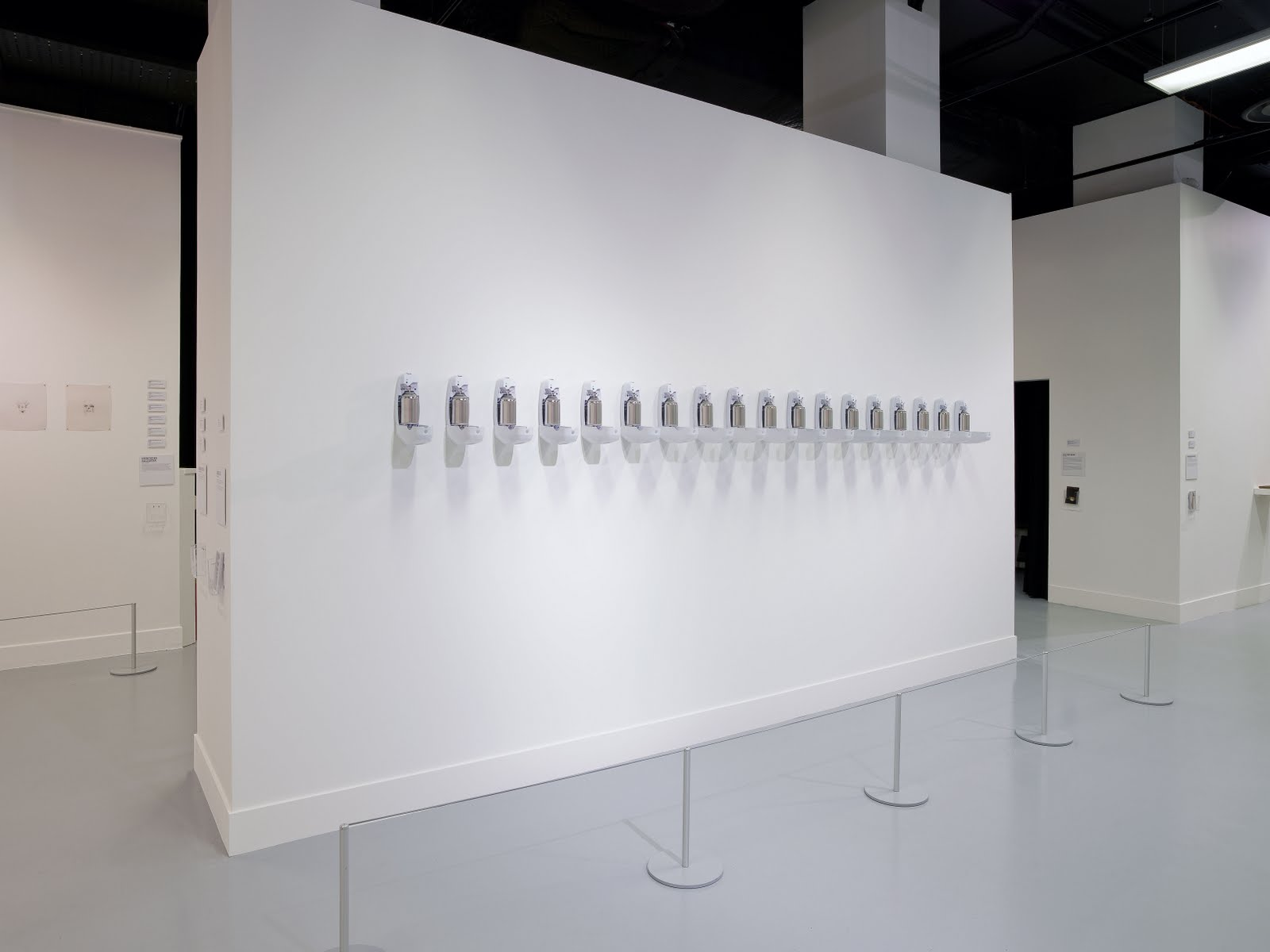
Airwicks, 2010, an installation by artist Russell Hill, using 18 automatic air freshener machines for Anticipation at Selfridges, London.

Russell Hill (born 1988, Rugby, Warwickshire) is an artist living and working in London, UK who works primarily in sculpture and installation art. He won the 2011 Catlin Art Prize. He is known for his work employing everyday materials, such as air fresheners or domestic appliances.

== Education and career ==
Hill is a graduate of the BA Fine Art Sculpture programme at Wimbledon College of Art, University of the Arts London and the Royal College of Art MA Sculpture programme under the guidance of Professor Richard Wentworth. He was selected for inclusion in Anticipation, an exhibition curated by art collector Kay Saatchi, alongside Catriona Warren, former editor of Art Review magazine. He was selected for inclusion in the Catlin Guide to the 40 important emerging artists in the UK (a publication which was launched at the London Art Fair) and subsequently won the Annual Catlin Art Prize in 2011, selected by curator Justin Hammond and judged by London gallerist Simon Oldfied, curator Julia Royse and art collector Richard Greer. The Catlin Guide 2011 and its 40 most promising UK art school graduates, including Hill, was featured in The Independent newspaper. His work was selected by curator (and creator of the Catlin Art prize) Justin Hammond, to appear in '100 Curators, 100 Days', hosted by Saatchi Online. He is Visiting Tutor at Brit School in Croydon, London and lectures at Wimbledon College of Art and Camberwell College of Arts. He has work in many private collections, in Asia, Europe and America. In 2012 he was profiled in a University of the Arts London film which charted his progress through art college and his experiences on the London contemporary art scene. In 2014 Hill was selected to show a solo presentation at Baltic Center For Contemporary Art. Recently, Hill has worked with toothpaste to create large installations at Baltic Centre For Contemporary Art, Royal College of Art and at John Latham's home and studio, Flat Time House, Peckham, London. Rob Alderson, states 'Hill's huge piece created using toothpaste has the perfect combination of wit and technical skill'
