= Convention of the North =

Political convention in England

- Status: Active
- Genre: Politics and business
- Frequency: Annually
- Country: United Kingdom
- Years active: 8
- Inaugurated: 6 September 2018, Gateshead
- Most recent: 29 February 2024, Leeds
- Previous event: 25 January 2023, Manchester
- Next event: 27 February 2025, Preston
- Area: Northern England
- Website: www.conventionofthenorth.org.uk

The Convention of the North is an annual political and business convention held in the North of England. First held in 2018 in Gateshead during The Great Exhibition of the North, the convention hosts leaders from politics, business, academia and civil society to discuss a shared agenda for the future of the North.

Year	Host city	Venue
2018	Gateshead	BALTIC Centre for Contemporary Art
2019	Rotherham	Magna Science Adventure Centre
2022	Liverpool	The Spine
2023	Manchester	Manchester Central Convention Complex
2024	Leeds	Royal Armouries Museum
2025	Preston	University of Central Lancashire
