= Erwin Puchinger =

Austrian artist

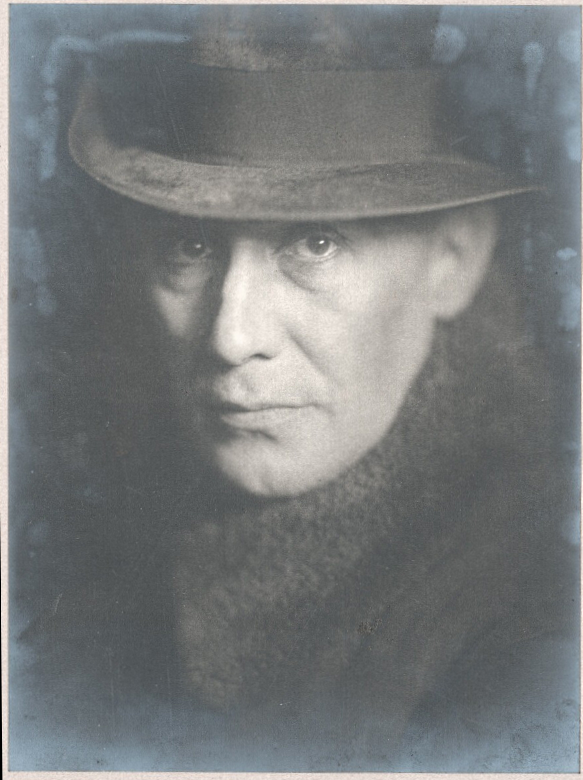
- Puchinger portrait by Rudolf Koppitz (1914)
- Born: 7 July 1875; Vienna, Austria-Hungary
- Died: 17 May 1944 (aged 68); Vienna, Germany
- Known for: Painter
- Movement: Jugendstil, Art Nouveau

Erwin Puchinger (7 July 1875, Vienna, Austria – 17 May 1944) was a Viennese painter, illustrator, industrial designer and graphic artist. He was an influential figure in Viennese art in the fin-de-siecle. Puchinger was a part of the Austrian Jugendstil and Gesamtkunstwerk (total art) movements, which sought to erase the boundaries between fine art and applied art. Puchinger worked in London, Prague and Paris as well as Vienna and collaborated with other major figures in Viennese art and design such as Ernst and Gustav Klimt and Otto Prutscher. He was a respected art professor at the Graphic Arts Institute, where he taught for more than thirty years. His work was also part of the painting event in the art competition at the 1936 Summer Olympics.

== Training and influences ==
Erwin Puchinger was born in Vienna on 7 July 1875. He came from a prominent family of Austrian officials. In 1891 and 1892, Puchinger began evening drawing classes at the newly opened (1888) Graphic Arts and Research Institute (der Graphischen Lehr und Versuchsanstelt). This was an experimental institute that trained professionals in design and the graphic arts. Next, Puchinger studied at the School of Arts and Crafts (Later the School of Applied Art), which was founded in 1867 as part of the new Austrian Museum of Science and Industry (Kunstgewerbeschule des Osterreichen de Museums fur Industrie und Kunst). Puchinger first studied with Ludwig Minnigerode (1847–1930) and then with the famous muralist and art professor Franz von Matsch (1861–1942), who worked on decorative art with the brothers Gustav (1862–1918) and Ernst Klimt (1864–1892), they had a decorating company that did elaborate murals for wealthy clients. Puchinger's earliest known works are landscape and architectural drawings of 1892 and 1893, which were already of a professional quality.

== The Viennese Secession ==
When Puchinger was in the last years of his studies, a group of young architects and artists, Otto Wagner, Josef Hoffman and Joseph Maria Olbrich, rejected the opulent and decadent style of the day and the variety of architectural styles of the Ringstrasse. They were Influenced by classical Greece and Rome and wanted to create buildings that were fresh and modern, where decoration was part of the design, rather than superfluous. Together with a group of young and innovative artists, including Gustav Klimt, Koloman Moser, Max Kurzweil (1867–1916), they broke away from the old academy, the Association of Austrian Artists that had held its exhibitions in the old Kunstlerhaus. They created a new union known as the Union of Austrian Artists (Vereinigung Bildender Künstler Österreichs) that is known as the Vienna Secession (das Wien Sezission). Because Erwin Puchinger's friend and classmate Kolo Moser was one of the Secessionists and the fact that they shared the same influences, his work is quite similar to that of Moser in style and execution. What Puchinger, Moser, Klimt, Wagner, Olbrich and Hoffmann were working toward was a unification of the arts, to erase the division between fine and applied art and to create projects where everything shared the same principles of design and execution, a total approach to art known in Vienna as Gesamtkunstwerk.

== The Exposition Universelle ==
In the year 1900, Erwin Puchinger completed his studies. He had made sketching trips to Capri and Rome, where he absorbed the classical influences. At the Exposition Universelle, the Paris Worlds Fair, of 1900, one of his large decorative paintings was given great prominence in the huge Austrian pavilion. He received accolades in the French, Austrian and British press. The first issue of the famous Viennese design magazine Das Interieur featured his work from Paris.

== Collections ==
- The Albertina Museum, Vienna
- Los Angeles County Museum of Art, Los Angeles
- Imperial War Museum, London
- Victoria & Albert Museum, London
- Wolfsonian Museum, Florida International University, Miami
- Austrian National Library, Vienna

== Associations and memberships ==
- Das Hagenbund, Vienna
- Vienna Workshop (Wiener Werkstätte )
- Vienna Secession (Vereinigung Bildender Künstler Österreichs, das Sezession)
- Austrian Artist’s Society (Gesellschaft bildender Künstler Österreichs, Künstlerhaus)

== Periodical sources ==
- Jos. Folnesics und Franz Ritter, Mittheilungen des K.K. Oesterreich Museums fur Kunst und Industrie: Monatschrift fur Kunstgewerbe, Wien: Oesterreich Museums fur Kunst und Industrie, Neue Folge V. Band, Januar 1894 Bis December 1895 (Official monthly magazine for the arts, Museum of Science and Industry) (Puchinger is cited on page 2)
- Guerinet Armad, editeur, Le Journal de la Decoration, Paris: Publication Periodique, 1900 (Puchinger’s work is reproduced)
- Dr. Ludwig Abels, Das Interieur: Wiener Monatshefte fur angewandte Kunst, Issue I, Wien: Kunstverlag Anton Schroll & Co., 1901 (Puchinger’s Interior for the Exposition 1900 reproduced on page 125)
- Dr. Ludwig Abels, Das Interieur: Wiener Monatshefte fur angewandte Kunst, Issue II, Wien: Kunstverlag Anton Schroll & Co., 1901 (Puchinger listed in the issue)
- Die Kunst und das schöne Heim:Monatschefte fur Freie und angewandte Kunst, München: Verlagsantalt F. Bruckmann A.G., 1901 (Puchinger and his collaborator Otto Prutscher’s designs reviewed on page 245)
- J.A. Lux, Das Interieur: Wiener Monatshefte fur angewandte Kunst, Issue IV, Wien: Kunstverlag Anton Schroll & Co., 1903 (Text on the collaboration between Otto Prutscher and Erwin Puchinger on page 22, 210, 224)
- J.A. Lux, Das Interieur: Wiener Monatshefte fur angewandte Kunst, Issue V, Wien: Kunstverlag Anton Schroll & Co., 1903 (Puchinger listed in issue).
- Die Kunst: Monatshefte fur Freie und angewandte Kunst, Dr. Ludwig Abels, Der Wiener Hangebund, München: Verlagsanstalt F. Bruckmann A.-G., 1902 (Article on the Hagenbud group, pages 75–79)
- Dekorative Vorbilder. Ornamente, Figuren, Blumen, Embleme, Landschaften, Allegorien, Heraldik, Stuttgart: Verlag von Julius Hoffmann, 1902 (Puchinger’s work was included in these folios with Mucha, Klimt, Moser)
- Charles Holme (editor), The International Studio, London: John Lane Company Volume 26, June–September, 1902 (Article with Puchinger and Prutscher at the London Exhibition, pages 291–292, Turin Exhibition, pages 47–52)
- Charles Holme (editor), The International Studio, London: John Lane Company Volume 29, August 15, 1903 (Article on Vienna and Viennese design in Studio Talk Section, pages 225–228)
- The Dial: A Semi-Monthly of Literary Criticism, Discussion and Information, Volume XXXVI, January 1-June 16, 1904, Chicago: The Dial Company, Publishers (Review, Imperial Vienna with Puchinger Illus., page 427)
- Dekorative Vorbilder. Ornamente, Figuren, Blumen, Embleme, Landschaften, Allegorien, Heraldik, Stuttgart: Verlag von Julius Hoffmann, 1904 (Puchinger’s work was included in at least one of the monthly folios in 1904)
- The United Service: A Monthly review of Military and Naval Affairs, Volume VII, Third Series, New York: L.R. Hammersly, February, 1905 (Review of Imperial Vienna with Puchinger Illustrations, page 254)
- Charles Holme, The International Studio, London:John Lane Company, Volume 53, 1914 (Puchinger listed in the Index of volume 53)
- Alexander Koch, Deutsche Kunst und Dekoration: eutsche Kunst und Dekoration, Darmstadt: Verlagsanstalt Alexander Koch, Volume 68, 1931 (Puchinger and his work on bookbinding included)

== Books and essays ==
- Verordnungsblatt fur den Dienstbereich des Ministeriums fur Cultus und Unterricht, Wien: Verlag des k.k. Ministeriums fur Cultus und unterricht, 1901 (Official Gazette for the Ministry of Culture and Education, an annual)
- Dr. August Weisz, Mitteilungen des Österreichischen vereins für Bibliothekswesen, Wien: in Commission bei Gerold & Comp., Volumes V-VIII, 1902 (Summarizes book releases, including books designs by Kolo Moser as well as Puchinger and Prutscher)
- A. S. Levetus, Imperial Vienna: An Account of Its History, Traditions and Arts, Illustrated by Erwin Puchinger, London: John Lane, The Bodley Head, 1904
- Prof. Dr. J.M. Eder, Editor, Photographishe Korrespondenz: Organ der Photographischen Gesellschaft in Wien, Wien: Verlag der Photographischen Korrespondenz, 1904 (page 400 reviews a catalog for the exhibition of the Photographic Society of Vienna which was designed by Puchinger)
- Charlotte von Langefeld, Friedrich von Schiller, künstlerische Ausstattung von Erwin Puchinger, Wien: Gerlach & Wiedling, 1905 (Art book on Friedrich von Schiller 1759–1805, issued for the centennial of his death, by the author Charlotte von Lengefeld, and illustrated by Erwin Puchinger)
- Katalog der XXXVIII. Jahresausstellung Wien Künstlerhaus 1913. Wien: Verlag der Genossenschaft der Bildenden Künste Wiens, 15 March 1913. (Catalog of the 38th Annual Exhibition of the Kunstlerhaus with works by Erwin Puchinger)
- Martin Handle, Arthur Knowles Sabin, War Posters Issued by Belligerent and Neutral Nations 1914–1919, London: A & C. Black, 1920 (Puchinger, pages xii, 10, 46)
- Den Frauen Wiens von Wiener Künstlern gewidmet. Zur Erinnerung an den 18. Juni 1921, Wien: Blumennacht Kunstlerhaus. (A book devoted to the depiction of women artists, a page to each prominent artist, the artists are: Charles Frederick Bell, Alfred Cossmann, Amadeus Dier, Alfred Gerstenbrand, Remigius Geyling, Otto Hofner, Emil Hoppe, Karl Huck, Albert Janesch, Rudolf Jettmar, RF Kirsch, S. Klotz-Dürr Bach, Joseph Kopf, Oskar Laske, Hans Massmann, Ferdinand Michl, Karl Ludwig Prinz, Erwin Puchinger, Hans Ranzoni, Alexander Rothaug, Oskar Roux, Fritz Schönpflug, Alois Leopold Seibold, Adolf Black, Black-Waldegg, Hans Strohofer, Franz Macik, Franz Windhager, Fritz Zerritsch)
- Dekorative Vorbilder. Farbige Meisterwerks aus alter und neuer Zeit, Stuttgart, Julius Hoffman & Co., 1926–1929 (Includes interior design “masterworks” by a number of prominent designers including Puchinger)
- Modern Book Production, London: The Studio Limited, 1928 (Puchinger is featured section on Viennese design, page 27)
- 52 Farbgraphiken von Wiener Künstlern. Graphiken, Wien, 1930 (Book of 52 color prints of Vienna by Viennese artists including Puchinger)
- Max Hussarek, Die Krise und die Lösung des Konkordats vom 18. August 1855. Ein Beitrag zur Geschichte des österreichischen Staatskirchenrechts (The story of the 1855 Concord, written by one of the Austria’s leading jurists and illustrated with woodcuts by Puchinger) Wien:Holder-Pichler-Tempsky, 1932
- Westermanns Monatshefte, Georg Westermann Verlag, 1941 (One of Puchinger’s works is reproduced on page 318)
- Wien um 1900: Ausstellung veranstaltet vom Kulturamt der Stadt Wien, 5. Juni bis 30. August, Wien: Historisches Museum der Stadt Wien. Kunstgewerbe, Künstlerhaus, 1964 (Puchinger is cited in this book on the Secession and its era)
- Maurice Rheims: L’Art 1900: ou le style Jules Verne, Paris: Arts et Metiers Graphiques, 1965 (Puchinger’s 1900 Paris Exposition entry is cited and reproduced on page 214)
- Vera J. Behal, Mobel des Jugendstils, Osterreichsches Museum fur angewandte Kunst, München: Prestel Verlag, 1981 (Catalog of Viennese Art Nouveau, Puchinger biography on page 75, also cited on page 24 and 75. This is the only short biography that lists Ludwig Minnigerode as one of his instructors)
- Mario Valeri Manera, La Arti a Vienna: dalla Secessione alla caduta dell’Impero asburgico, Palzzzo Grassi, Venezia, Edizioni La Biennale, Milano: Mazotta, 1984 (Puchinger featured and biography on page 578)
- Franco Borsi, Vienna 1900: Architecture and Design, New York: Rizzoli, 1986 (Excellent background on Vienna during Puchinger’s era and he is cited.) ISBN 0-8478-0616-2
- Giovanni Fanelli, Ezio Godoi, Art Nouveau Postcards, New York: Rizzoli, 1987 (One of Puchinger’s many postcards is reproduced)
- Wien 1938 : Historisches Museum der Stadt Wien, Wissenschaftliche Realisierung Durch Das Dokumentationsarchiv Des Osterreichischen Widerstandes, 11. Marz Bis 30. Juni 1988, Rathaus, Volkshalle., Wien: *Osterreichicher Bundesverlag, 1988 (Puchinger mentioned on page 404)
- Wilhelm Brauneder, Das Zeitalter Kaiser Franz Josephs I.: Österreich 1848–1918: das Tagebuch einer Epoche Wien: C. Brandstatter, 1989 (Puchinger is cited) ISBN 3-85447-297-8
- Christopher Bertsch, Marcus Neuwirth, Die Ungewisse Hoffnung:österreichische Malerei und Graphik zwischen 1918 und 1938, Residenz Verlag, 1993 (Puchinger is cited on pages 127, 135, biography appears on page 255)
- A Checklist of Painters c1200-1994 represented in the Witt Library, Courtauld Institute of Art, London, London: Mansell Publishing Limited, A Cassell imprint, 1995, ISBN 1-884964-37-0 (Puchniger in the collection)
- Marianne Jobst-Rieder, Alfred Pfabigan, Manfred Wagner, Das letzte Vivat: Plakate und Parolen aus der Kriegssammlung der K.K. Hofbibliotek, Wien: Holzhausen, 1995, ISBN 3-900518-31-9. (“The Last Hurrah” is a book on World War I placards and posters and Puchinger’s work is featured on page 27)
- Walter Killy, Rudolf Vierhaus, Dietrich Von Engelhardt, Deutsche Biographische Enzyklopadie, München: K.G. Saur, 1995
- Manfred Wagner, Alfred Roller in seiner Zeit, Residenz Verlag, 1996 (Puchinger is cited on page 211)
- Franz Goldstein, Ruth Beiträge von Kähler, Herman Kähler, Monogrammlexikon / Dictionary of Monograms, Internationales Verzeichnis der Monogramme bildender Künstler seit 1850, Berlin: Walter de Gruyter, 1999,
- Arbeitskreis Bild Druck Papier, Bd. 1, Tagunsband, Munster: Waxmann Verlag GmbH, 1999, ISBN 3-89325-751-9 (Arbeitskreis Art Paper Proceedings) (Puchinger World War I Illustrations, page 88)
- Richard Stanton, The Forgotten Olympic Art Competitions: The Story of the Olympic Art Competitions in the 20th Century, Canada: Trafford Publishers, 2001 (Puchinger’s 1936 entry cited on page 402)
- Monika Faber, Klaus Albrecht Schroder, The Eye and the Camera: The Albertina Collection of Photographs, Graphische Sammlung Albertina, Munichner Standmuseum. Fotomuseum, Wien: Seuil, 2003 (Puchinger Reproduction)
- Sarah Scleuning, Weapons of Mass Dussemination, Wolfsonian Museum, Miami: Florida International University, 2004 (Puchinger’s World War I 5 ½ % War Loan Poster is reproduced)
- Morseburg, Jeffrey, Erwin Puchinger, A Genius for Design, 2010, (Appears on Puchinger web site)
