= Emily Hesse =

British visual artist, author and activist

- Born: April 27, 1980; Middlesbrough, North Yorkshire
- Died: November 4, 2022 (aged 42); Linthorpe, North Yorkshire
- Education: Durham University, Sunderland University
- Spouse: Dr Martyn Hudson
- Website: https://www.emilyhesse.com

Emily Hesse (27 April 1980 - 4 November 2022) was a multidisciplinary British visual artist, author and activist.

== Projects and exhibitions ==
In 2012, as part of the Saltburn Arts Fair in Saltburn-by-the-Sea, Hesse exhibited her works, I Will Never Forget You. Not For All Of My Days and We Are As Much What Lies Behind, As We Are Tomorrow. at the Saltburn School, where she was artist in residence. During her residency Hesse developed the Class One Project, which with funding from Middlesbrough Institute of Modern Art sought to establish a contemporary art gallery in an old external classroom building.

In 2015 Hesse exhibited as part of the Localism exhibition at Middlesbrough Institute of Modern Art under through her project New Linthorpe, which sought to re-imagine the work of Dr Christopher Dresser at the Linthorpe Art Pottery. During this work, Hesse studied for an MA Ceramics at Sunderland University, to develop her skills as a ceramicist in order to be able to master the skills associated with ceramics and pass them on to her local community.

Hesse was selected as an artist for the Great Exhibition of the North in early 2018. When the exhibition organisers announced the sponsorship from BAE Systems Hesse worked with other artists to protest their unexpected sponsorship and following a vocal online campaign she, with her fellow campaigners, were successful in persuading the company to discontinue its support for the event.

In 2018, Te Me No Press published Hesse's auto-biographical book, Black Birds Born from Invisible Stars, which was commissioned by curator George Vasey for the exhibition 'The Everyday Political' at the Lake Gallery at Southwark Park Galleries in London. Later that year, Workplace Gallery in Gateshead hosted Hesse's solo exhibition 'The Taste of this History: a Church in my Mouth', which explored the challenges faced by female, working-class, artists such as herself.

In 2022 as part of The Tetley Jerwood Commissioning Programme, Hesse created The Witches’ Institution (W.I.), an exhibition imagined and developed with Professor Andrea Philips, Baltic Professor and Director BxNU Research Institute, Northumbria University.

== Publications ==
- Black Birds Born from Invisible Stars (2018)

== Awards ==
- Nominee, Paul Hamlyn Foundation Awards for Artists (2013)
- Runner-up, The Arts Foundation (2020)
- Henry Moore Foundation Artist Award (2020)
