= Henrietta Dubrey =

British painter

Henrietta Dubrey (born 1966) is a painter currently living in West Penwith, Cornwall. She studied at the Wimbledon School of Art, graduating in 1989.

Dubrey has an interest in calligraphy and gesture-making, in common with Penwith artists of the 50s and 60s. She has been selected eight times for the Royal Academy of Arts Summer Show, most recently in 2003.

In 2011 and 2012 some of her pictures were featured on the sets of the BBC television series Absolutely Fabulous.

Her work has been exhibited at the Edgar Modern Gallery, Bath, and the Belgrave Gallery, St Ives. In March 2017 she took part in an exhibition of "groundbreaking" woman artists, at the Sarah Wiseman Gallery in Oxford, to mark International Women's Day.
