= Jo Self =

English painter

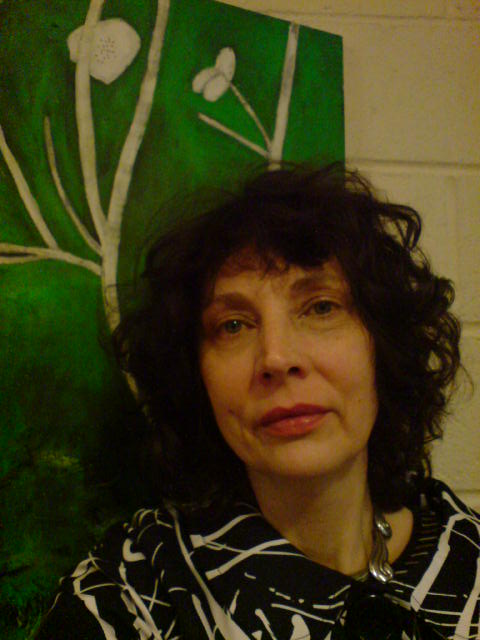
Jo Self

Studio, Brixton, London: paintings shown 'Pink Tibetan Lotus' 12ft x 7ft oil on canvas. 2005. Jo Self. 'Ocean'. oil on canvas. 2006. 24" x 36". Jo Self.

Jo Self (née Lee; born 15 January 1956) is an English contemporary artist and poet.

== Background ==
Self was born and grew up on a Hertfordshire rural housing estate. Before becoming an artist, she worked in various jobs including as a croupier ("bunny") at the Playboy Club, and lodged with Ian Board of the Colony Club where she met artist Francis Bacon, writer Elizabeth Smart (Canadian author), author-journalist Jonathan Self (brother of novelist Will Self) to whom she was briefly married. After the birth of her first child she trained at Wimbledon School of Art where her first work was a prize-winning series of narrative paintings including flower images. She subsequently studied at Chelsea College of Art and Design.

== Career ==
Self specializes in often monumental oil paintings of flowers. From 2001 to 2003 she painted in the Royal Botanic Gardens, Kew, where she was artist-in-residence in the Marianne North studio. She has since lectured at Wimbledon and at the Slade School of Fine Art.

In 2004, she created a painting of the private garden of the Dalai Lama in Northern India during a residency of three months between 2004–2005. A. S. Byatt summarised the experience of this show with flowers as a combination of toughness and fragility, quoting Shakespeare: "How with this rage shall beauty hold a plea / whose action is no stronger than a flower?"

In 2006–2007 Self worked at night from the steps of Tate Britain painting the river Thames.

Her works appear in collections including those of Arthur Andersen, London, John Brown Publishing, Schroder Investment Management, Accenture, J Sainsbury plc, Westdeutsche Landesbank, London, and the Dowager Duchess of Devonshire.

She is currently represented by Browse and Darby of London.

== Bibliography ==
- Self, Jo (2003), Flowers, Frances Lincoln Publishers, ISBN 978-0-7112-2219-9
- Self, Jo (2005), Paintings from the private garden of his Holiness the XIV Dalai Lama, Tenzin Gyatso Dharamsala, Northern India, Redfern Gallery, London, ISBN 0-948460-06-7
