= Jill Gibbon =

British artist

Jill Gibbon is a British artist, best known for sketching people in the arms trade while working undercover at arms fairs. She is a senior lecturer in graphic arts at Leeds Beckett University.

Gibbon earned a bachelor's degree from Leeds Polytechnic (now Leeds Beckett University), a master's from Keele University, and a PhD from Wimbledon School of Art.

Gibbon visits arms fairs posing as a global security expert, and sketches people active in the arms trade.

In 2018 Gibbon helped to lead a high profile campaign that successfully pressured arms manufacturer BAE Systems to withdraw its sponsorship of the Great Exhibition of the North.

Gibbon is Reader in Graphic Arts, School of Arts at Leeds Beckett University.

== Publications ==
- The Etiquette of the Arms Trade – Ten Years of Drawing by Jill Gibbon (2018)
