= Maria Marshall =

English-Swiss artist

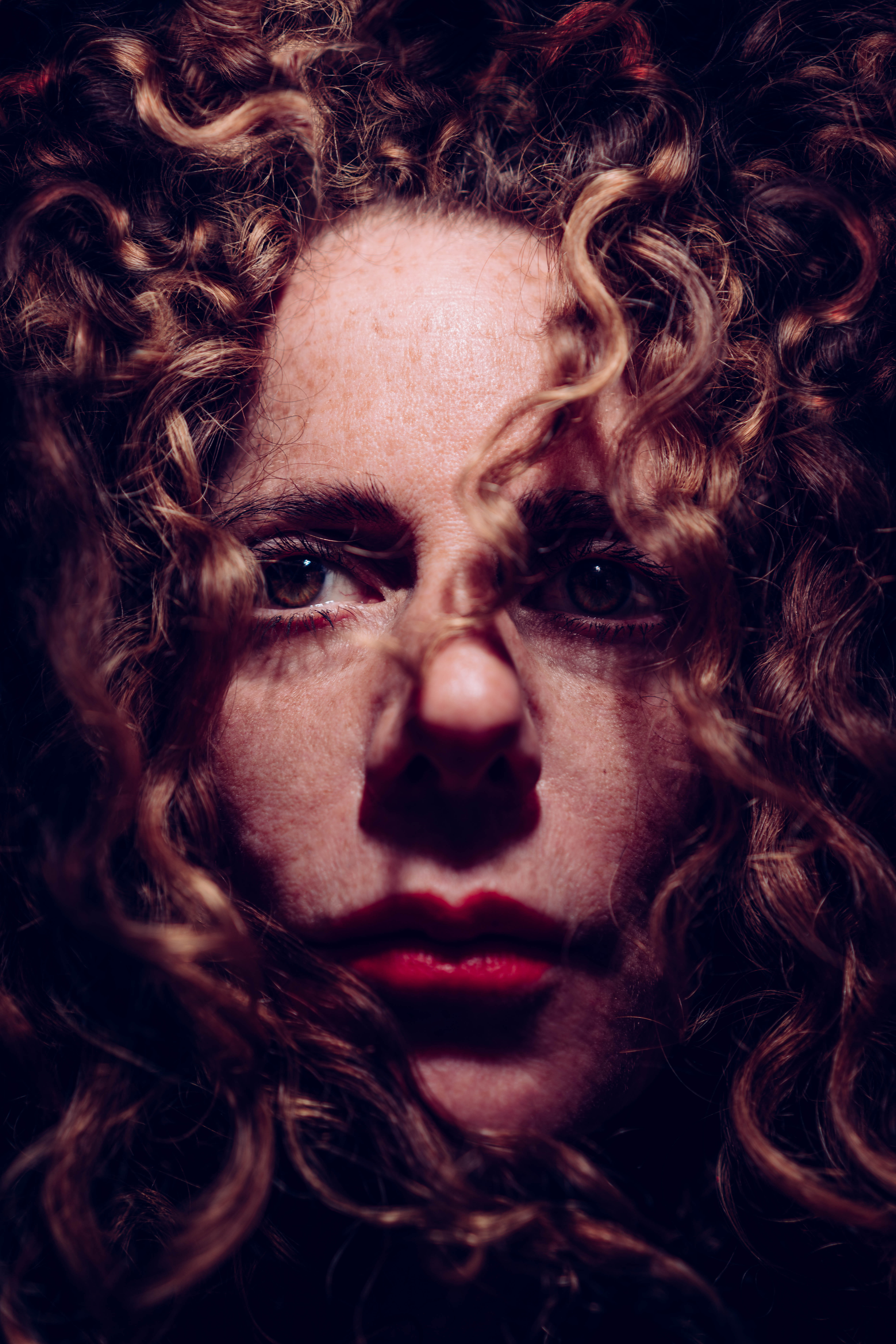
- Marshall in 2018
- Born: Maria Marshall; 1966 (age 59–60); Bombay, Mumbai, India
- Education: Chelsea College of Arts; Wimbledon College of Arts, London
- Known for: Artist
- Notable work: When I grow up I Want To Be a Cooker (1998)
- Website: mariamarshall.com

Maria Marshall (born 1966) an English-Swiss artist born in Mumbai, India. She became known for her video work in the late 90's, working mostly with children. Her recent works include "Thought", an alter ego character who can infiltrate the mind and replace thoughts. Based on meditation, this is a multimedia work which includes video, photography, painting and sculpture.

== Biography ==
Maria Marshall was born in Mumbai, India. Today, she lives and works in Berlin. A dual Swiss and British citizen, she holds a degree in sculpture from the Wimbledon College of Arts in London. She has also studied at the Chelsea College of Arts in London and the Geneva School of Fine Arts.

== Work ==
=== Art ===
The general atmosphere of her films is reported to be dreamlike and agonizing. She takes on moral and psychological issues, using digital illusions and creates pieces that, projected as installations, are striking for the spectator's mind. The intention, she says, is not to shock, but to provoke the viewer through a seductive image, to ask themselves what makes them feel uncomfortable.

Her films often revolve around the world of childhood, projecting adult concerns. She stages them in situations that make the adult viewer uncomfortable. Innocence itself becomes ambiguous. It perverts these "taboo" subjects, childhood, innocence, oscillating between good and evil, between sacred and profane. Children or adolescents are always threatened, confronted with evil, alone in the face of danger. This reflects the anguish of a mother for her children. Her videos, she says, include her paranoia as a mother 2,3,4. These works continue to be shown internationally, including at the National Museum of Women in the Arts. With the spread of the Internet and increased freedom of speech in the US, her work has been appropriated by fake news trolls who use the work to sensationalize their YouTube videos.

Marshall has recently created an alter ego super heroine character, "Thought" she uses to investigate. Her emotionally charged films eradicate war, by erasing thought, silencing "Thought", investigating meditative spaces, such as the Everest series. "Thought" dances at a Mount Everest base camp—a freedom dance, Sufi whirling all around the world and painting the noise around the mind as in Stille and Flak shown at Art Loft Berlin, Werkhalle Wiesenburg, Berlin. In Hair Sweet Hair, a site specific exhibition on the implication of hair on "Thought" includes paintings, sculptures and photography.

The roles in her films are mostly played by her own children, which adds an emotional density and intensity to the work. There is precision in the execution of the work—the mediums, light source and framing. Marshall uses techniques such as loops, zooms and slow motion, to amplify the anxiety and the obsessive side of her films.

The titles of her works, for example: When I Grow Up, I Want To Be A Cooker, are sentences spoken by her children. The sound is often limited to a child's voice that repeats a looping phrase, such as "I Love You Mummy, I Hate You", or a haunting, amplified sound, such as in Playground, the sound of the missing ball on the wall of the chapel. Marshall also uses the potency of silence.

The aesthetics of her works can refer to ancient painting, such as Caravaggio's The Madonna with the Snake. In the case of I Should Be Older Than All of You a box shows a young boy lying, motionless and very calm, is surrounded by snakes. The rigorous composition of the framing is in itself a reference to Baroque paintings. This forms a link to Western imagery and consequently makes the films more disturbing.

=== Selected videos ===
When I Grow Up I Want To Be A Cooker, (1998). A two-year-old child is seen inhaling a cigarette, and blowing out perfect smoke rings.

I Saw You Crying. A teenager laughs in slow motion in front of a billowing yellow curtain. He raises a gun and shoots towards the camera. The curtain turns red, as the boy cries.

Trout. A child pedals forward on a tricycle with a sign that says "Love Me". As he cycles forwards through the public they walk backwards.

Cyclops. Video installation. Two videos projected together in a corner. A woman in underwear is on one screen, a child in a vest on the other. The camera revolves around them like a predator in their cold rooms. The woman is lit in a sequence of disturbing lights. There seems to be a longing from one screen to the other to dispel the separation. The sound is recorded from the camera, an ominous sound that matches the movement. The motion control rig is called "Cyclops" the film is consequently titled Cyclops.

Playground. A teenager plays football in slow motion against a church. The ball is removed, but the shadow continues to play. The sound of the ball hitting the wall and the boy's effort is amplified, making it resonate. The boy kicks the ball around the Church like an object. This work is anti establishment.

Don´t let the T Rex Get The Children. The video begins with a close-up of a child's face. They lick the screen and then smile. As the camera reveals the child's face in incongruous rapturous laughter, the viewer, first discovers his shaved head and then a bright green straight jacket and a velvet padded cell. These discordant elements are disturbing as they play with our suspension of disbelief.

I Should Be Older Than All Of You, (2000). Using a motion control camera filming the rib cage of a child breathing, it pulls out in slow motion to reveal a child lying still in a box of red and orange silks. With the precision of a Donald Judd structure and Rothko tones. As the camera shows the whole image, slithering in the gold silk edge are snakes, reminiscent of a baroque frame. The snakes slither towards the child who is unperturbed.

When are we there?, (2001). The viewer walks up a marble staircase, along a paneled corridor and into a room where a woman stands unflinching. The viewer examines the woman and with the gaze appears indentations on the skin, movements, as if it was invisibly touched by the viewer's gaze.

I Love You Mummy - I Hate You. A hammock, containing two little boys, rocks. One says "Í love you Mummy", the other says´"I hate you". As the hammock repeatedly rocks rhythmically to the voice, the hammock is presented without the boys. Initiating a sense of loss.

Dance for freedom- Thought. Marshall's alter ego Sufi whirls all around the world.

I can see the wood for the trees. Positioned on two opposite screens one shows a tank shooting across the space at 'Thought' holding a crying baby. A paintbrush appears in 'Thought''s hand and she makes paint strokes that are simulated on the opposite screen eradicating the tank from the image with the brush strokes.

=== Solo exhibitions ===
- 1998, Team Gallery, New York.
- 1999, Team Gallery, New York - Real Art Ways, Hartford, Connecticut.
- 2000, Galerie Vaclava Spaly, Prague - Yves St Laurent, Paris - Oliver Art Center, CCAC Institute, Oakland; San Francisco, Larry Rinder - Gallery 400, University of Illinois, Chicago.
- 2001, Freiburger Kunstverein, Freiburg - Team Gallery, New York.
- 2002, Fonds Régional d'Art Contemporain, Provence-Alpes-Côte d'Azur - Palais de Tokyo, Paris - screening/talk, Centre Pompidou, Christine Macel - Team Gallery, New York - Project Space, The Swiss Institute, New York - Site Gallery, Sheffield - Göteborgs Konsthall, Göteborg.
- 2003, Salon 94, New York, Jeannie Greenberg Vandoren-Rohatn - Ruth and Bill True collection, Western Bridge, Seattle.
- 2004, Cry Pig, Team Gallery, New York - Centre pour l'image Contemporaine, Genève.
- 2006, Playground, Musée Dauphinois, Grenoble - Three Works, Herzliya Museum, Israel.
- 2009, Artist spotlight. New Frontiers, Sundance Film Festival
- 2011, Tank TV, London.
- 2012, In my End is my beginning, site specific installation
- 2014, Mac's Museum Grand-Hornu, Belgium, curator Laurent Busine
- 2016, Kaus Australis, Rotterdam.
- 2017, Grace, site specific, curator Nadja Romain, Werkhalle Wiesenburg, Berlin. Freight and Volume, New York.
- 2018, Hair sweet hair, site specific, Berlin.

=== Group exhibitions ===
- 2003, The American Effect, curator Larry Rinder, The Whitney Museum of American Art, New York. ThrowBack, Team Gallery, New York. Ninos, curator Cristina Zelich, Centro de Arte de Salamanca, Spain. Child In Time, curator Frank Hoenjet, Gemeentemuseum Helmond, Germany. Clash of Cultures, curator Kathrin Becker, Neuer Berliner Kunstverein, Berlin.
- 2004, Showcase, South London Gallery, London. Dimension Folly, Galleria Civica di Arte Contemporanea, Trento, Italy. Présences et Apparitions/une visite particulière, Fonds Régional d'Art Contemporain, Marseille, France. Borusan Centre for Culture and Arts, Istanbul, Turkey. Dresden Academy of Fine Arts, Zwischenwelten, Dresden, Germany.
- 2005, Fade To Black, Umea Kulturförvaltning, Umeå, Sweden.
- 2006, RUNDLEDERWELTEN, Martin-Gropius-Bau, Berlin.
- 2008, Curated 3 x 3 Yinka Shonibare.
- 2009, Centre D'art de Neuchatel, France. Museo de Arte Contemporaneo, Barcelona, Spain. Musee national de Céramique, Aix en Provence, France. Azerbaijan Biennale.
- 2010, Apexart Gallery, New York. Centre photographique d'ile-de-France, Paris. Closed Circuit: Video and New Media, Metropolitan Museum of Art, New York. Shenzhen Biennale, Shenzhen, China.
- 2012, Kunsthalle Krems, Austria, Sheffield Docfest.
- 2013–14, Centre Pompidou festival. Ikono festival. Pinault Collection at the Conciergerie, Paris]. Triple tour, curator Anne Pierre d'Albis, LVMH Red square, Moscow, . Faking it, Metropolitan Museum of Art, New York.
- 2014, Manifesta 10, Hermitage Museum Russia, Alanica National Russian collection, University of Toronto gallery, Dazibao Centre, Montreal.
- 2015, Playback, Pierre Hubert collection. Shanghai, Moscow Biennial.
- 2016, So many steps so little time. Bruges, Belgium.
- 2017, Frankfurt Biennial. Revival, National Museum of Women in the Arts. Bright Childhood, curator Marco Hompes, Museum Villa Rot', Germany. Mixed Pickles, curator Nils Muller, Kunstraum der Michael Horbach Stiftung. 118 th edition of Verona Fieracavalli, curator Rebecca Russo (collection director of Videoinsight).
- 2018, 1968: Sparta Dreaming Athens, Château de Montsoreau, Montsoreau, Loire Valley. Two sides of Pankow, Berlin ( June- September) Art loft ‘Reloaded’ (October).

=== Selected collections ===
The Solomon R. Guggenheim Museum, New York, NY, USA; The Metropolitan Museum of Art, New York, NY, USA; Fonds Regional d'Art Contemporain, PACA, Marseille, France; Musée des Arts Contemporains, Grand Hornu, Belgium; Bowdoin College Museum of Art, Brunswick, ME, USA; The Progressive Collection, Cleveland, OH, USA; Fondazione Sandretto Re Rebaudengo per l'Arte, Torino, Italy; The Contemporary Arts Society, London, United Kingdom; Site Gallery, Sheffield, United Kingdom; Stedelijk Museum voor Actuele Kunst, Gent, Belgium; The Robert J. Shiffler Collection, Greenville, OH, USA; Bill and Ruth True Collection, Tony Podesta Collection, National Museum of Women in the Arts, LVMH, Pinault Collection; Zablodovitch Collection; Auckland Print Studio; National Centre for Contemporary Arts, Francis Greenburger collection.

== Residencies awarded ==
Auckland print residency, New Zealand, KAUS Australia. Rotterdam. Wapping Project residency, Bethanien, Berlin. St.Moritz Art Academy.

== Juries ==
2017, Pratt film students for inclusion in Bam cinema

=== Bibliography ===
- Maria Marshall: I Love You Mummy, I Hate You, exhibition catalog Busine, Laurent (Curator), Gielen, Denis (Texts), Grand-Hornu, Museum of Contemporary Arts, 2013.
- Maria Marshall, Dorothea Strauss, MODO Verlag, 2002.
- Double trouble = Cifte bela. Beral Madra editions, 2001.
- Maria Marshall, Jane Norrie, Maria Marshall editions, 1992.
