= Kenny Ho (stylist) =

Chinese fashion designer

- Born: China
- Education: Wimbledon School of Art
- Occupations: Stylist, Costume designer
- Known for: Stylist to celebrities

Kenny Ho is a stylist and costume designer based in London. He is the stylist to celebrities including the Spice Girls and Westlife.

== Career ==
Kenny Ho started off is education in Daniel Stewart’s and Melville College in Edinburgh.

Kenny Ho studied costume design at the Wimbledon School of arts in London. While still in school, Ho received his first commission, assisting in costume design for David Bowie.

=== Spice Girls ===
After graduating in 1996, Ho started working with the Spice Girls as a wardrobe assistant on their film Spiceworld. He later became the group's personal stylist. He designed all the costumes for their 1998 Spiceworld Tour.

Ho also the stylist for Geri Halliwell's 1999 solo debut. He also worked as stylist for Spice Girls members Victoria Beckham, Melanie C, and Emma Bunton after the group broke up.

=== Other work ===
Ho's clients also include pianist Myleene Klass and Girls Aloud.

Ho created the costumes for The Borrowers film starring John Goodman.

== Personal life ==
Ho lives in London. He had a stint in New York in 2007 before returning to London.
