= Carole Hodgson =

English sculptor

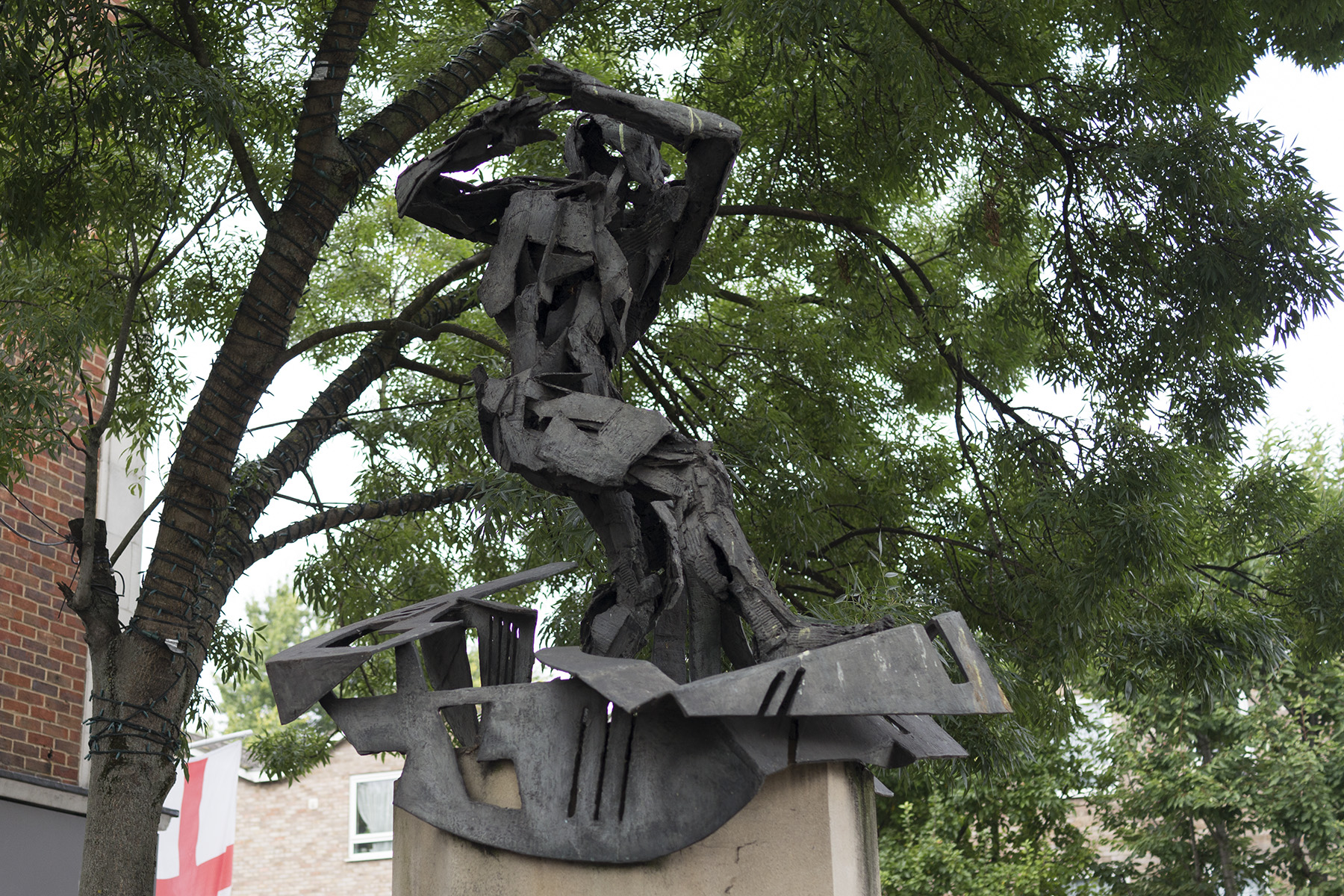
River Celebration.

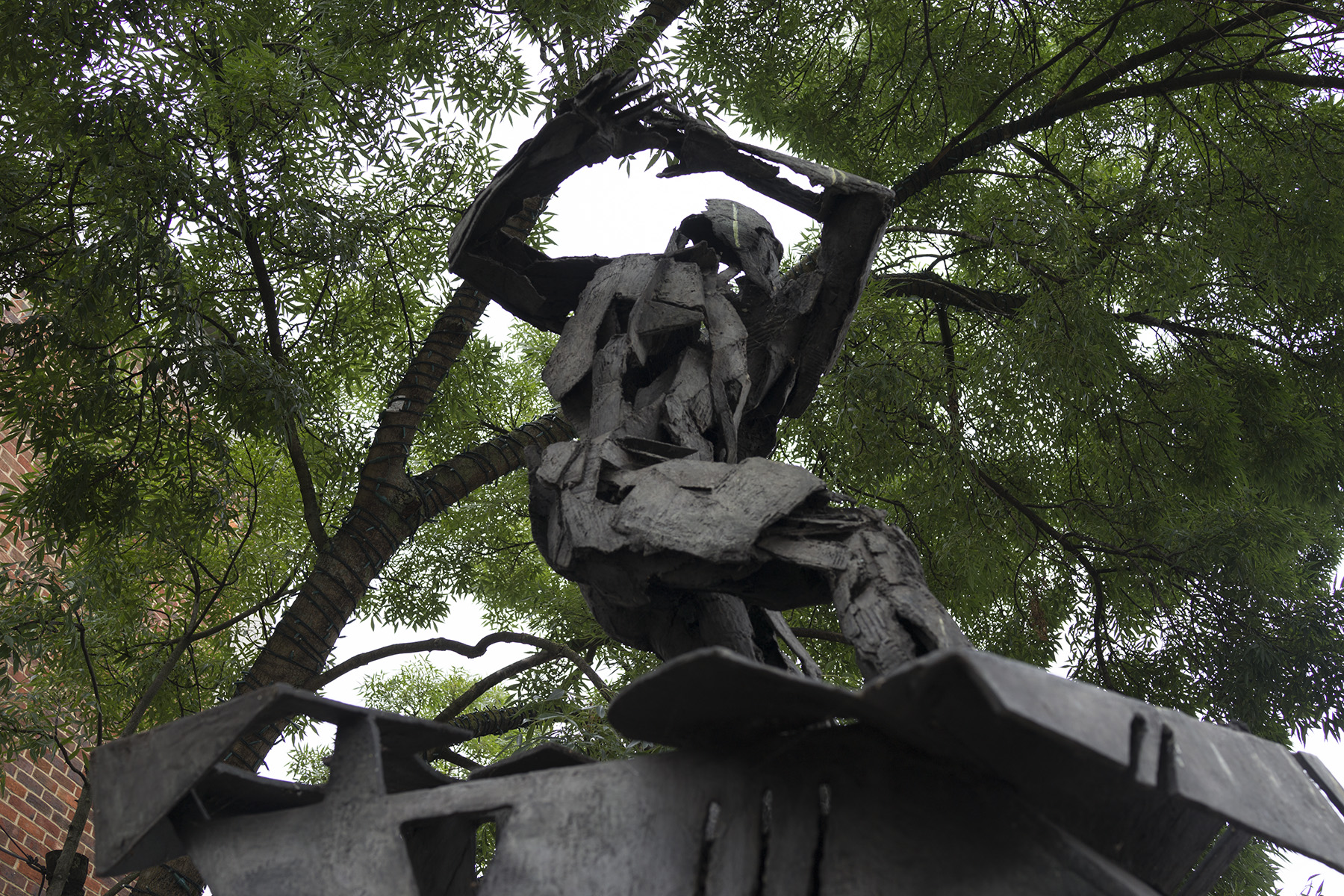
River Celebration Detail.

Carole Hodgson (24th August 1940 - 10th March 2025) in London is an English sculptor.

== Biography ==
Hodgson studied at the Wimbledon School of Art from 1957 to 1962 and at the Slade School of Fine Art from 1962 to 1964. She is an Emeritus Professor of Fine Art and Sculpture Kingston University and a Fellow of the Royal Society of Sculptors.

For over 40 years, Hodgson drew upon the landscape as the central source of inspiration for her work. Her distinctive vision of the natural world, expressed with precision and clarity in her sculpture and drawings, reflects a finely tuned sensitivity to her surroundings. Her range of materials and subjects take inspiration from an array of subject matter such as the ancient sculptures of Greece, to the Welsh landscapes.

Hodgson has exhibited at the Flowers Gallery in London since 1973. In March 2015, a retrospective exhibition of her important works over 40 years took place at the Flowers Gallery. To accompany the exhibition, Joan Bakewell wrote: We seek the stillness of remote places to soothe our panic at global combust. We find in the deep reaches of rock and ravine a balm to modern anxieties. Hodgson's work both derives from and pays regard to these present sensibilities.

Hodgson’s major public sculptures include River Celebration, a bronze sculpture commissioned in 1989 for the Kingston upon Thames Relief Road. She has had major solo shows in leading museums and galleries in Britain and around the world.

== Bibliography ==
- From City to Lake, [images of Guatemala, 2005] Angela Flowers
- British Sculptors of the 20th Century, [biographical dictionary edited by Alan Windsor, 2003] Ashgate.
- Carole Hodgson, [by Mary Rose Beaumont, introduction Joan Bakewell, 1999] Momentum.
- From the Sea to the Wall, [images of China, 1995]. Kingston University Press.
