= James Hawkins (artist) =

English painter

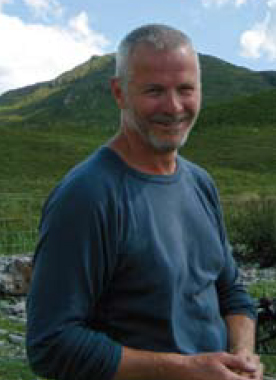
- James Hawkins photo 2009
- Born: 14 April 1954 (age 72); Bath, England
- Education: Wimbledon School of Art, London and Ruskin School of Drawing, Oxford University
- Known for: Painting and Film Making
- Awards: Painter of the Year, Warwick Arts Trust, London

James Allan Hawkins (born April 1954) is an English painter and film maker associated with Scottish Highland landscape. He lives, works and exhibits at his open studio RhueArt in Rhue, three miles North of Ullapool.

== Early life ==
Hawkins was educated at Monkton Combe School, Bath. He went on to study at Wimbledon School of Art, London and Ruskin School of Drawing, Oxford University. After graduating he moved to the Highlands of Scotland in 1978 with his wife Flick.

== Career ==
His early work was figurative and mostly painted outside, on-location on the West coast of Scotland. After a commission in 1986 to produce stage sets for a production of The Brahan Seer at Eden Court Theatre, Inverness his work became larger and semi abstract. He exhibited at the 369 Gallery, Edinburgh during the 1980s and in 1989 he won Warwick Arts Trust prize. In 1996 his paintings were part of Heartlands an overview of Scottish landscape painting at the City Art Centre, Edinburgh. Commissioned to paint large polyptych for Inverness airport in 2004. In 2005 he began making short video films about nature's microcosm. In 2012 Hawkins has broken away from his traditional medium or acrylic on stretched canvas and started working with carbon fiber and core board to create freestanding irregular shaped cut-out pieces.

== Style ==
Hawkins work has always concentrated on landscape. Early paintings were figurative painted in watercolour on location. After he turned to acrylic his practice became increasingly studio based but with reference to frequent camping and walking trips throughout Scotland. The work has been abstract at times and representational at others a progression that the artist describes as "being like climbing a spiral staircase, by turns arriving at a similar point but from a different perspective". The surfaces of the paintings are complex and textured the artist applying paint with large painting knives and pieces of board. Most recently he has been making cut out paintings, fragments of landscape that are freestanding irregular shapes mounted on carbon fiber.

== Solo exhibitions ==
- 2012 Cutting Edge, RhueArt in Cork Street London
- 2009 Chronicles of the straight line Ramblers Club, London
- 2007 Water, Wind and Light, Kilmorack Gallery, Beauly
- 2006 Atlantic Coast, Duff House Scottish National Galleries, Banff
- 2003 Way Out West, Davies and Tooth, London
- 2002 Kilmorack Gallery Beauly
- 2001 Art on the Links, St Andrews
- 1999 Landscape, Colour and Light, Davies and Tooth, London
- 1998 A Journey in all Weathers, Davies and Tooth, London
- 1997 Inferences, Bellevue Gallery, Edinburgh
- 1996 Duncan R Millar Fine Arts, Glasgow
- 1993 Coventry Gallery, London
- 1992 Sacred Sights, C.Boyd Gallery, Galashiels
- 1991 Sense of Place, 369 Gallery, Edinburgh
- 1990 Gallerie Van Alom, Berlin
- 1989 Gallery 202 London
- 1987 Landmarks, 369 Gallery, Edinburgh
- 1983 McLean Art Gallery, Greenock

== Group exhibitions ==
- 2011 Perception, RhueArt at Dovecot Studios, Edinburgh; Scottish Housing Expo, Inverness
- 2009 Glasgow Art Fair
- 2008 Thompson's Galleries, Aldeburgh, London
- 2005 Millennium Institute, University of the Highlands and Islands; Kilmorack Gallery, The Gallery, Cork Street, London; Art’05 London Contemporary Art fair
- Scottish Exhibition, Richmond Hill Gallery, London
- 2004 Thompson's Gallery Aldeburgh, London; Kilmorack Gallery, Beauly
- 2003 Summer Exhibition, City Art Centre, Edinburgh
- 2002 International Art Fair, New York; Exhibition, Fort Lauderdale, Florida USA
- 2001 Art'01 London Contemporary Art Fair
- 2001 Living the Land, Duff House, Scottish National Galleries, Banff
- 1997 Lineart’97, International Art Fair, Ghent
- 1996 ART 96, London Contemporary Art Fair
- 1996 Glasgow Art Fair
- 1996 Heartland, 20th Century Scottish Landscapes, Edinburgh
- 1995 ‘Prints for the Western Isles’, Gulbenkian Foundation
- 1991 Mountain Experience, Highland Region Touring Exhibition
- 1989 Scottish Landscape, 369 Gallery National Touring Exhibition; Into the Highlands, McManus Gallery, Dundee
- 1988 Light and Space, Crawford Arts Centre, St Andrews; Tenth Anniversary Exhibition, 369 Gallery Edinburgh; Artravaganza, Smith Gallery, Stirling
- 1987 Seven Artists’ View of Iona, 369 Gallery Edinburgh
- 1986 McLean Biennial, Greenock
- 1978 369 Gallery, Edinburgh
- 1975 Balliol College, Oxford

== Film and video ==
- 2008 ambiEnt Festival, Brescia, Italy
- 2007 A Series of Fortunate Events, Inverness City Centre; Royal Scottish Academy Summer Exhibition, Edinburgh; Water, Wind and Light, Kilmorack Gallery, Beauly
- 2006 Atlantic Coast, Duff House, Scottish National Galleries, Banff
- 2005 Dreaming Spires, Edinburgh
- 2001 Highland Festival ‘Elements’, Animation Collaboration
- 1986 Biston Betularia, performance/ video

== Awards and Commissions ==
- 2004 The Great Glen, Inverness Airport
- 1998 Scottish Art, GlenFiddich Distillery, Dufftown
- 1989 Painter of the Year, Warwick Arts Trust, London
- 1986 The Brahan Seer, Eden Court Theatre, Inverness
- 1976 Painting Prize, Ruskin School of Drawing, Oxford University

== Collections ==
- Buchanan Ingersoll, London
- City Art Centre, Edinburgh City Council
- Denton Wilde Sapte, London, Brussels, Paris
- The Fleming Collection, London
- Gallery of Modern Art, Glasgow
- Highland Council
- Highland Regional Council
- Paintings in Hospitals, Scotland
- Prudential plc
- The Royal Bank of Scotland
- Warwick Arts Trust
