= Patricia González (artist) =

Colombian-born American artist

Patricia Gonzalez
- Born: Cartagena
- Education: Central School of Art and Design; Wimbledon School of Art
- Known for: Artist
- Awards: Grumbacher Award
- Website: "Patricia González's web site". Archived from the original on 2017-10-15.

Patricia González is a Colombian-born American artist.

Born in Cartagena, she moved to London, England with her family. She studied art at the Central School of Art and Design and at the Wimbledon School of Art. In 1981, she moved to Houston. In 1987, she received a National Endowment for the Arts fellowship and, 1987 was included in the "Hispanic Art in the United States: Thirty Contemporary Painters and Sculptors" exhibition at the Corcoran, Museum of Fine Arts, Houston and several other museums. In 1989, she had a solo exhibition at the Contemporary Arts Museum Houston. Her work has also been exhibited in Los Angeles, New York City, Austin, Washington and Cartagena.

Gonzalez was included in the 1989 book Exposures, Women & Their Art.
