= Jill Daniels =

British independent filmmaker

- Born: Manchester, Lancashire, England
- Education: Wimbledon School of Art; University of the Arts London; Royal College of Art; University of East London
- Occupation: Film director
- Years active: 1976–present
- Employer: University of East London
- Website: www.jilldanielsfilms.com

Dr Jill Daniels is a British independent filmmaker and a Senior Lecturer in Film at University of East London.

== Early life ==
Daniels was born in 1948 in Manchester, Lancashire, England, and comes from a Jewish family of Romanian and Russian (now Lithuania) descent. She studied fine art at Wimbledon School of Art. She received an M.A. in Film and Television from the Royal College of Art, London and gained her PhD at the University of East London. She was a founding member and the London Secretary of the Independent Filmmakers Association and Secretary of the Working Women's Charter Campaign and editor of the newspaper Women's Fight.

== Career ==
Daniels joined the Working Women’s Charter Campaign and edited the newspaper Women's Fight, from 1977 to 1981. In 1991 she was a jury member of the Huesca International Film Festival, Spain. In 2014, she gained her PhD in Film from the University of East London. She wrote a chapter for the book Truth, Dare or Promise: Art and Documentary Revisited (2013), Cambridge Scholars, Newcastle Upon Tyne, and was co-editor with Gail Pearce and Cahal McLaughlin. In 2019, she published the book Memory, Place and Autobiography, Cambridge Scholars, Newcastle Upon Tyne. She is co-Chair of the editorial board of the academic journal Media Practice and Education. She wrote a chapter entitled "Scripting the Experimental Documentary Film: Developing the 'script' for Not Reconciled", for The Palgrave Handbook of Script Development, edited by Stayci Taylor & Craig Batty (2022).

Filmography:

- If Not Now (2023) https://vimeo.com/789270145/380e4614ce, Best Short Documentary, Mannheim arts and film festival, 2023.
- Resisters (2021) https://doi.org/10.37186/swrks/13.1/10, Best Protagonist, ProToPost Communist Film Festival, Italy, 2023.
- Breathing Still 2020 (2020) https://vimeo.com/398485823
- Breathing Still (2018) https://vimeo.com/253291495, Jury Award, Best Documentary, Small Axe @Tolpuddle Radical Film Festival, 2018.
- Journey to the South (2017) https://vimeo.com/196726666
- My Private Life II (2015) https://vimeo.com/139077147, Honorable Mention, Experimental Forum Film Festival, 2017; Best Experimental Film, Ann Arbor Experimental Film Festival, USA, 2017. (AAFF voted North America’s No. 1 Film Festival for 2019 in the USA TODAY 10 Best Readers' Choice travel award contest); Nominated in ‘Innovation’, Arts & Humanities Research Council (AHRC) Film Awards, 2016.
- My Private Life (2014) https://vimeo.com/101938665, Honorable Mention. Athens International Film Festival, Ohio, USA. 2014. https://athensfilmfest.org/2015-winners/
- The Border Crossing (2011) https://vimeo.com/93590375, 3rd prize, Best Feature Documentary, Athens International Film Festival, Ohio, USA. 2012.
- Next Year In Lerin (2010) [2000] https://www.youtube.com/watch?v=72gRd3PKAtI
- Not Reconciled (2009) https://vimeo.com/28050084, Best Direction, Bruxelles Online Film Festival, Belgium. 2010; Special Mention, Festival de Cine de Granada, Spain. 2010.
- Small Town Girl (2007) https://vimeo.com/92532574, Best UK Documentary, British Film Festival, Los Angeles. 2010; Best Documentary Feature, filmdirecting4women Film Festival, London. UK. 2009; Nominated Best UK Documentary, Swansea Bay Film Festival, Wales. 2008.
- Lost in Gainesville (2005) https://vimeo.com/95210232
- Fool's Gold (2002) https://vimeo.com/92523649
- Exiles (1991) https://cinenova.org/artist/jill-daniels/
- I'm In Heaven (1990) https://cinenova.org/artist/jill-daniels/ - Best Fiction Film, Huesca Short Film Festival, Spain, 1991.
