= David Alesworth =

UK-based dual national artist

David Chalmers Alesworth, (A.R.B.S.) (born 1957 in Wimbledon, Surrey) is a UK-based dual national artist, who divides his time between Bristol and Pakistan. Trained originally as a sculptor in the UK, he moved to Pakistan in 1987 and engaged with the popular visual culture of South Asia and with urban crafts such as truck decoration. He teaches art in Pakistan at various institutions including until recently the Beaconhouse National University, Lahore.,

== Biography ==
Alesworth studied art at the Wimbledon School of Art in the tradition of late Constructivism and won the prestigious Stanley Picker Fellowship at Kingston University. He then took up a teaching assignment at the Glasgow School of Art. His encounter with Pakistani culture, especially truck art, in the early 1980s opened up his practice to a range of new materials and he moved to Karachi, Pakistan in 1987.

In 2005 Alesworth moved to Lahore, Pakistan, and took up a teaching position at Beaconhouse National University in the School of Visual Art (SVAD, BNU) where he taught until May 2015, then relocating to the UK. He currently maintains a studio in Bristol and works between the UK and Pakistan. He is married to the Pakistani artist Huma Mulji.

In 2014 he was represented in the 8th Berlin Biennale at the Dahlem Museum Berlin curated by Juan Gaitan and at the inaugural exhibition at the new Agha Khan Museum in Toronto, in The Garden of Ideas, curated by Sharmini Pereira.

He was short-listed for the Victoria and Albert Museum's fourth edition of the Jameel Prize in 2016.

== Art and exhibits ==
Over the years, Alesworth has examined the conventions and visual codes of Pakistani society and of urban life in particular. His exhibits have displayed a wide range of formal influences from contemporary mass culture to the purism of late Constructivism. Many of these themes were evident in his versions of missiles and the very English teddy bear toys, displayed at the Canvas gallery (Karachi) in 2002.

=== Installations and Public Art ===
He started working with truck artists in the mid-to-late 1990s and produced several acclaimed installations, conceived in collaboration with Durriya Kazi. Through these collaborations and working with these craftsmen, he produced installations or interactive sites, such as Heart Mahal, Very Sweet Medina and Promised Lands (Arz-e-Mauood) which generated substantial interest at local and international showings and cultivated a renewed attention towards cultural politics and aesthetics of cinema hoardings, truck art, bazaar artefacts, and commercial sign paintings.

=== Probes ===
Where most of his practices were based loosely around decorative flourishes of the urban bazaars, his central themes have remained environmental degradation and nuclear proliferation influencing works like Two Bombs Kiss in 1993.

His series of comical missile sculptures developed out of concern for the induction of nuclear weapons in Pakistan. The nuclear tests in April 1998 had become an iconic symbol in Pakistani streets and images of the Ghauri missile were painted atop trucks and walls all over the city. Models of the missile were displayed as sculptures across town. David referred to his latest work as a continuation of an enduring enquiry and celebration of Pakistan's urban street culture and positioned it as part celebration of the material and process and part critique of the dubious and potentially disastrous aspiration to weaponise the nation.

The exhibition had a companion show with Alesworth's take on the teddy bear, where he unpacked this globalised icon in numerous ways. The teddy bears were translated into welded, riveted and soldered steel plate with polka-dots and displayed in public places similar to the missiles. The 'Teddy's Bears' reference both their origin in American political history and their connotation of the restraint of power and the toys of a war child; this in the context of the American and Western powers interventions in Afghanistan over the last decades.

=== Textile Interventions ===
Since 2005 Alesworth's work has been substantially engaged with the post-colonial, in large part due to his relocation to the historic city of Lahore which is also known as the City of Gardens. In this period he has created a number of works based upon the oriental carpet which he has termed textile interventions. Over the last decade his work has been predominately organised around ideas arising from The Garden. However this has been a very expanded ideation of the garden, more of the global forest of which we are all a part or as nature and culture than of the urban garden, but that too. He has visited the Botanical Garden as a concentration camp of exotic aliens, imprisoned in an act of cultural cleansing (Linz : 2007). The post-colonial garden in the video work "Joank" 2008, several public botanical interventions in Berlin, 2009–2010 and botanical taxonomy in The Garden of Babel 2009. Also ideas of garden perfection in the textile works Garden Palimpsest 2010 and Hyde Park, Kashan 1862 of 2011 amongst others. He takes the garden as his key metaphor with which to probe humanity's culturally specific relationships with the natural world and toward understanding nature more as a social problem.
