= Wimbledon College of Arts =

Art school of the University of the Arts London

Coordinates: 51°24′48″N 0°12′43″W

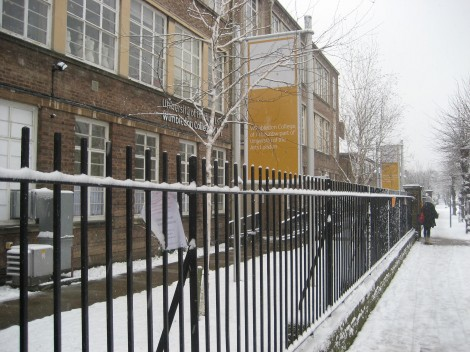
- Established: 1890
- Affiliations: University of the Arts London
- Location: London, United Kingdom
- Website: arts.ac.uk/wimbledon
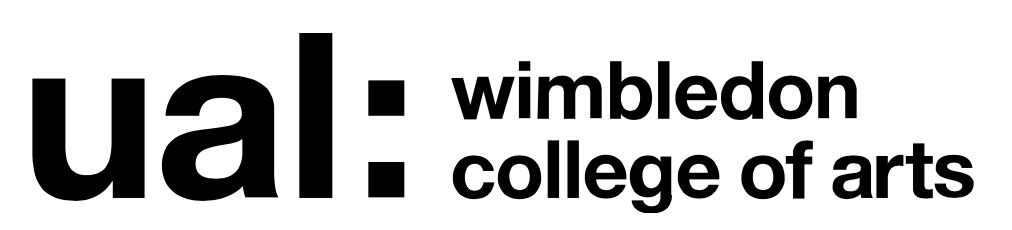

Wimbledon College of Arts, formerly Wimbledon School of Art, is a constituent college of the University of the Arts London, a public art university in London, England. The college specialises in theatre, screen and performance arts and design. It is located in Wimbledon and Merton Park, South West London.

== History ==
The foundation of Wimbledon College of Arts goes back to 1890, when an art class for the Rutlish School for Boys was started. Between 1904 and 1920 this was housed in the Wimbledon Technical Institute in Gladstone Road. It became independent in 1930 and moved to Merton Hall Road in 1940. Theatre design was taught from 1932, and became a department in 1948. BA courses were introduced from 1974, and MA courses from 1984. In 1993 the school, which previously had been controlled by the London Borough of Merton, was incorporated as an independent higher education institution, and from 1995 awarded degrees accredited by the University of Surrey.

Wimbledon School of Art became part of the University of the Arts London in 2006 and was renamed Wimbledon College of Art. In 2013 it was renamed Wimbledon College of Arts.

Wimbledon delivers specialist art, design and theatre courses ranging from undergraduate to postgraduate, as well as providing research supervision for students undertaking a research programme of study.

== Affiliations ==
Wimbledon is a constituent college of the University of the Arts London, with Camberwell College of Arts, Central Saint Martins, Chelsea College of Arts, London College of Communication and London College of Fashion.

== Notable alumni ==
- James Acheson (costume designer)
- David Alesworth (artist)
- Hurvin Anderson (artist, Turner Prize nominee 2017)
- Ilan Averbuch (sculptor)
- Jeff Beck (musician)
- Joyce Bidder (sculptor)
- Pauline Boty (a founder of the Pop Art movement)
- Raymond Briggs (author, famous for The Snowman)
- Georgina Chapman (fashion designer and actress)
- Malvina Cheek (artist)
- Prunella Clough (artist)
- Alan Collins (sculptor)
- Hilda Cowham (illustrator)
- Tony Cragg (1988 Turner Prize winner)
- Sebastian Dacey (artist)
- Jill Daniels (film director)
- Peter Doig (1994 Turner Prize nominee)
- Henrietta Dubrey (artist)
- Mildred Eldridge (artist)
- Angelo Evelyn (artist)
- Eamon Everall (artist)
- Robert Fuest (film director)
- Jill Gibbon (artist)
- Soutra Gilmour (set designer, Laurence Olivier Award nominee)
- Patricia Gonzalez (artist)
- Jonathan Gray (editor)
- Sarah Greenwood (production designer, known for Beauty and the Beast, Atonement (film), Anna Karenina)
- Henry Haig (stained glass artist)
- John Haldane (philosopher)
- Anthea Hamilton (Turner Prize nominee)
- Corin Hardy (film director)
- James Hawkins (artist)
- Robin Hill (Australian artist)
- Russell Hill (artist)
- Lubaina Himid (Turner Prize winner 2017)
- Kenny Ho (stylist)
- Carole Hodgson (artist)
- Richard Hollis (graphic designer)
- Richard Hudson (production designer, famous for Walt Disney's The Lion King/Tony Award winner)
- Dennis Huntley (artist)
- Charles Knode (costume designer)
- Cheryl Lucas (ceramicist)
- Maria Marshall (artist)
- Tom McGuinness (musician)
- Robert Micklewright (1923–2013), artist and illustrator
- Bill Mitchell, founder of site-specific theatre company Wildworks.
- Aries Moross (graphic designer)
- Alice Normington (production designer, British Academy of Film and Television Arts winner)
- Christopher Oram (theatre designer and Laurence Olivier Award winner)
- Nick Ormerod (theatre designer)
- Mabel Pakenham-Walsh (artist)
- Eugene Palmer (artist)
- Maria Petschnig (artist and filmmaker)
- Phoebe Philo (fashion designer, former director of Céline and Chloé)
- William Pye (sculptor)
- Beth Rogan (actor)
- Jo Self (artist)
- Unity Spencer (1930–2017), artist
- Tony Stallard (artist)
- Rajesh Touchriver (film director)
- Anthony Ward (theatre designer, Tony Award winner for best costume)
- Gillian Wise (artist)
- Carol Wyatt (artist)

== Notable staff ==
- Robert Buhler (1916–1989)
- Prunella Clough (1999 Jerwood Painting Prize winner)
- Maggi Hambling (painter and sculptor, Jerwood Painting Prize winner 1995)
- Freda Skinner (1911–1993), sculptor and woodcarver
- Yolanda Sonnabend, theatre and ballet designer and painter
- Anthony Wood, FSHA, FSSI, (heraldic artist, calligrapher and illuminator; lecturer and art teacher (1965–1986) at the Wimbledon School of Art )
