= Robert Witt (art historian) =

British art historian

Sir Robert Clermont Witt CBE FSA (16 January 1872 – 26 March 1952) was a British art historian, who, along with Samuel Courtauld and Lord Lee of Fareham, was a co-founder of the Courtauld Institute of Art in London.

Witt was born in Camberwell, south London, in 1872, the son of German parents Gustavus Andreas Witt, a merchant born in Hamburg, and Friederike Helene Von Clermont, from Frankfurt. He was educated at Clifton College and read history at New College, Oxford. In 1896, he fought in the Second Matabele War, and worked alongside Cecil Rhodes as a war correspondent.

He qualified as a solicitor in 1897. In 1899, he married Mary Helene Marten, a fellow Oxford student who, like him, collected photographs and reproductions of works of art. Their joint collection, eventually surpassing 500,000 items, was housed in their home at 32 Portman Square, London.

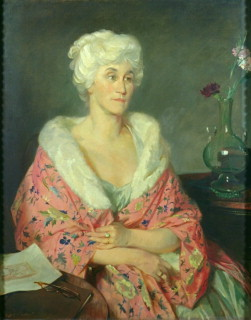
Portrait of Lady Witt (Mary Helene Marten), by Glyn Philpot

The Witt Library, as the couple referred to it, was the world's largest archive of reproductions of paintings and drawings, and turned their home into an international study center for scholars of art history. The collection was bequeathed to The Courtauld Institute upon the couple's death in 1952.

In 1902, Witt wrote How to Look at Pictures, a practical guide for the layperson. He joined the National Art Collections Fund in 1903 and was its second chairman from 1921 to 1945. In the King's Birthday Honours 1918 Witt was appointed a Commander of the Order of the British Empire and in the New Year Honours 1922 was appointed a Knight Bachelor.

He died at his home in London, aged 80.

His work on artists lives on in A Checklist of Painters from c1200-1994.
