= Catlin Group =

Bermuda-based insurance and reinsurance company

Catlin Group Limited
- Type: Public
- Traded as: LSE: CGL
- Industry: Insurance/Reinsurance
- Founded: 1984 as Catlin Underwriting Agencies Limited
- Headquarters: Hamilton, Bermuda
- Key people: John Barton (Non-Executive Chairman); Stephen Catlin (CEO)
- Products: Aviation and aerospace insurance and reinsurance, casualty insurance and reinsurance, energy insurance, marine insurance and reinsurance, property insurance and reinsurance, accident & health insurance, equine/livestock insurance, contingency insurance, credit and political risk insurance, credit insurance
- Revenue: $4,400 million (2014)
- Operating income: $488 million (2014)
- Net income: $418 million (2014)
- Website: www.catlin.com

Catlin Group Limited was a Bermuda-based specialty insurance and reinsurance company. Catlin operated six underwriting hubs worldwide and operated more than 55 offices worldwide. It owned the largest syndicate at Lloyd's of London, based on 2011 gross written premiums. Catlin shares were listed on the London Stock Exchange until it was acquired by XL Group plc in May 2015.

== History ==
Catlin Underwriting Agencies Limited (CUAL) was established as an underwriting agency at Lloyd's of London in 1984 by Stephen Catlin, who today remains chief executive of the Catlin Group. Catlin's first Lloyd's syndicate (Syndicate 1003) began underwriting in 1985 on behalf of Lloyd's Names (private individuals who invested in the Lloyd's market) with a premium capacity of £6 million.

Syndicate 1003 grew successfully during its early years, outperforming the Lloyd's market as a whole, particularly during the period from 1988 to 1992 when Lloyd's reported huge financial losses.

By its 10th anniversary in 1995, Syndicate 1003 had increased its premium capacity to £170 million. During that year, the company received a substantial private equity investment from Western General Insurance Company of Bermuda, which was controlled by the Pritzker family. The investment allowed Catlin to establish a second Lloyd's syndicate (Syndicate 2003), which underwrote coverage in parallel with the established Syndicate 1003. While Syndicate 1003 continued to write coverage on behalf of capital supplied by traditional Lloyd's Names, Syndicate 2003 was backed by capital solely supplied by Catlin.

In 1999, Catlin incorporated a holding company in Bermuda, originally called Catlin Westgen Holding Limited and later renamed Catlin Group Limited. Catlin was the first of the traditional Lloyd's of London managing agents to establish a holding company in Bermuda, a strategic move later copied by several of its peers.

Following the World Trade Center tragedy in 2001, Catlin expanded its operations and strengthened its balance sheet. In 2002, Catlin raised US$532 million in private equity funds from a consortium of investors (including $482 million of new equity capital and the provision of a $50 million term loan facility). The equity capital, in the form of convertible preferred stock, was provided by a consortium of private equity investors. It was the only company operating at Lloyd's to receive private equity financing in the wake of 9/11; most of the funds that were injected into the insurance market were directed to start-up insurance and reinsurance companies formed in Bermuda.

Catlin shares were listed on the London Stock Exchange in 2004. The Group's initial public offering, which was several times oversubscribed, raised nearly $200 million in new capital.

In October 2006 Catlin announced that it intended to acquire Wellington Underwriting plc, which managed one of the largest syndicates at Lloyd's and had established underwriting operations in the United States: the acquisition was completed on 18 December 2006.

On 9 January 2015, it was announced that Catlin Group would be acquired by XL Group plc. The acquisition was completed in May 2015.

== Operations ==
=== Underwriting hubs ===
Catlin organises its operations into six 'underwriting hubs': London/UK, Bermuda, United States, Asia-Pacific, Europe and Canada.

The Group maintains that the underwriting hubs serve to diversify Catlin's underwriting portfolio as the offices within each hub underwrite regional business that would not normally be written at Lloyd's or in the London market. The offices also allow Catlin to work more closely with clients and their brokers on a local basis.

The London/UK hub is composed of Catlin's original operation and includes London wholesale insurance and reinsurance business underwritten by the Catlin Syndicate at Lloyd's (Syndicate 2003), the largest syndicate at Lloyd's of London in terms of premium volume, and Catlin UK (Catlin Insurance Company (UK) Ltd.), which writes UK regional business as well as London market wholesale business.

The Bermuda hub consists of the operations of Catlin Bermuda (Catlin Insurance Company Ltd.), which underwrites property and casualty treaty reinsurance and selected classes of specialty insurance.

The United States hub, which trades under the Catlin US brand, includes business underwritten by Catlin's 17 US offices. These offices underwrite on behalf of US-based insurers owned by the Catlin Group—Catlin Insurance Company Inc., Catlin Specialty Insurance Company Inc. and Catlin Indemnity Company—as well as the syndicate at Lloyd's. This hub also is responsible for Catlin's two Latin American offices, located in São Paulo and Bogota.

The Asia-Pacific hub includes offices in Singapore and Kuala Lumpur, which were established in 1999 and were the first offices established by Catlin outside London. The Asia-Pacific hub now includes underwriting offices in Hong Kong, Shanghai, Sydney and Melbourne and representative offices in Tokyo and Mumbai.

The Europe hub was established in 2003 with an office in Cologne. The hub now includes 12 other European offices in Germany, France, Italy, Spain, Switzerland, Belgium, Norway and Austria. It also includes the operations of Catlin Re Switzerland Ltd., a Zurich-based reinsurance company that commenced underwriting at 1 January 2011. Catlin Re Switzerland writes most classes of non-life treaty reinsurance business primarily for clients based in Europe, and it also writes credit and surety classes of reinsurance for a worldwide client base.

The Canada hub underwrites property/casualty insurance and reinsurance for Canadian clients and operates from offices in Toronto, Montreal, Vancouver and Calgary.

Altogether, Catlin now operates more than 55 offices in 21 countries.

=== Underwriting entities ===
The business underwritten by the hubs is written on behalf of Catlin-owned insurance carriers. These include the Catlin Syndicate and Lloyd's, Catlin UK, Catlin Bermuda, Catlin Re Switzerland and three insurers (Catlin Insurance Company, Catlin Specialty Insurance Company and Catlin Indemnity Company) operated by Catlin US.

== Classes of business ==
Catlin underwrites more than 30 classes of insurance and reinsurance. The business underwritten by Catlin is divided into product groups: Aviation, Casualty, Energy, Marine, Property, Reinsurance, Specialty, and War & Political Risk.

- The classes of insurance underwritten by Catlin include property, general liability, professional liability/indemnity, energy, aviation, marine hull and cargo, accident and health, specie, satellite, equine and livestock, product recall, construction and engineering, motor fleet, and inland marine.
- Classes of reinsurance underwritten include property (both catastrophe and pro rata), casualty, marine and aviation, and excess of loss.

== Ratings ==
All of Catlin's underwriting units have been assigned a financial strength rating of 'A' (Excellent) by A.M. Best. Standard & Poor's has assigned an insurer financial strength rating of 'A' (Strong) to the Catlin Group.

The Catlin Syndicate also benefits from the 'A+' (Strong) financial strength rating assigned by Standard & Poor's to the overall Lloyd's market.

== Catlin Seaview Survey ==
Catlin is the title sponsor of the Catlin Seaview Survey, which commenced in September 2012. The Catlin Seaview Survey is a major scientific expedition whose aim is to document the composition and health of coral reefs worldwide. During 2012 the Survey focused on sections of the Great Barrier Reef across an unprecedented range of depths. During 2013 the Survey will investigate reefs in several other locations worldwide, including Bermuda, the Caribbean, Florida and Hawaii. The scientific data currently being gathered by the Catlin Seaview Survey is intended strengthen the understanding of how climate change and other environmental changes are likely to affect ocean ecosystems.

In conjunction with the Catlin Seaview Survey, Catlin is also the sponsor for the Catlin Global Reef Record. This data base will include images and data collected by the Catlin Seaview Survey as well as information collected by other studies of coral reefs. Beginning in 2013, the Catlin Global Reef Record will be made freely available to scientists worldwide to monitor changes in marine environments.

== Catlin Arctic Survey ==
Prior to the Catlin Seaview Survey, Catlin was the title sponsor of the Catlin Arctic Survey, a three-year project to produce scientific data about the impact of climate change and other changes to the environment.

Catlin Arctic Survey 2009 measured the thickness and density of the permanent sea ice floating in the Arctic Ocean. The measurements were taken by three experienced polar explorers, led by Pen Hadow, who trekked nearly 450 kilometres over 73 days. The information gathered by the explorers was subsequently analysed by University of Cambridge scientists, who concluded that the Arctic sea ice could disappear during summers within 20 years.

Catlin Arctic Survey 2010 focused on what has been described as the 'other' carbon problem beyond climate change: ocean change. Under the auspices of the Survey, scientists from British, French and Canadian research institutions are gathering at a purpose-built 'Ice Base' at the edge of the Arctic Ocean to study whether the increase in global carbon emissions is causing increased carbon dioxide absorption by the seas. This could potentially lead to increased ocean acidification, which could significantly affect species living in the seas and create knock-on effects in the global food chain.

In addition to the Ice Base, more information is being collected during Catlin Arctic Survey 2010 on the thickness of the sea ice, following on from the 2009 Catlin Arctic Survey. Three explorers are again embarking on a two-month trek across the Arctic sea ice, gathering information that is vital for scientists to understand the impact of ice cover reduction on ocean acidification. This trek ended in May 2010 when the explorers reached the North Pole.

Catlin Arctic Survey 2011 focused on thermohaline circulation, which are powerful ocean currents that circulate warm and cold water around the world's oceans. These currents have a major impact on Earth's climate and weather patterns. While a number of processes drive thermohaline circulation, there are a few that are unique to the Arctic. By collecting data on these processes, scientists associated with Catlin Arctic Survey 2011 hope to determine how important the Arctic is to thermohaline circulation, and what changes are taking place. Research was again conducted from the Catlin Ice Base as well as during a southward trek by three explorers which began at the North Pole.
