= The Great Exhibition of the North =

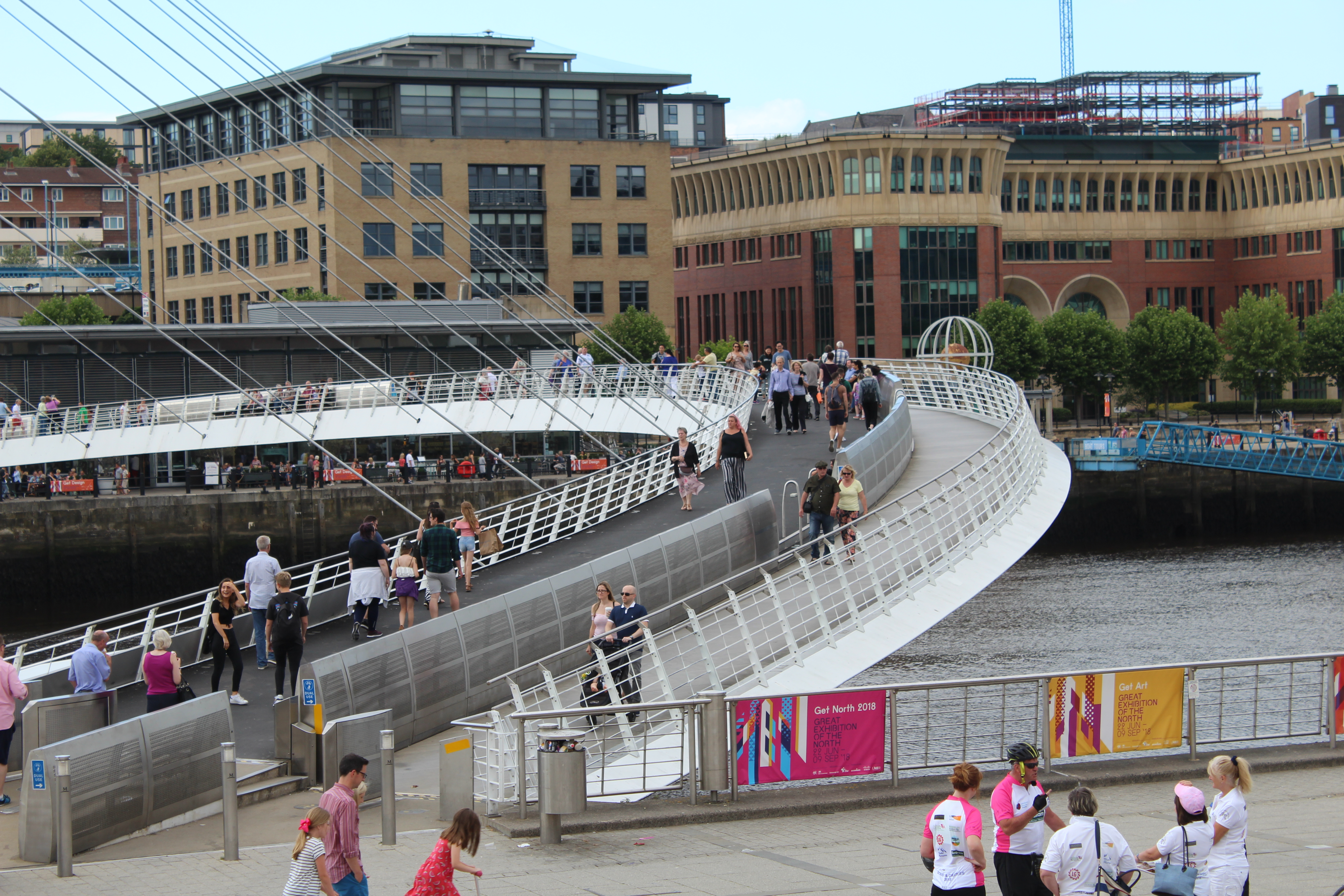
- Volunteers for the exhibition on the south side of the Tyne
- Date: 22 June – 9 September 2018
- Location: 54°58′20″N 1°36′30″W
- Website: https://getnorth2018.com/

The Great Exhibition of the North was a two-month exhibition, celebrating art, culture, and design in the North of England, held in Newcastle and Gateshead between 22 June and 9 September 2018.

Culture Minister Ed Vaizey described the event as "a fantastic opportunity to promote the very best of Northern art, culture and design", adding that "Investment in our arts and culture not only benefits these sectors but, as we have seen from Hull being named UK City of Culture 2017, can drive regeneration of whole towns and cities."

The competition to host the exhibition was launched in April 2016, and bids were taken from the North of England (defined as Yorkshire and the Humber, the North West, and the North East). Nine bids were received, including Halifax, Harrogate, Scunthorpe, St Helens and Whitehaven with Blackpool, Bradford, Newcastle and Gateshead and Sheffield selected as the shortlist.

Newcastle and Gateshead were chosen to host the event, with Great Exhibition Board chairman Gary Verity saying "Newcastle and Gateshead put forward an exciting and innovative bid to host the Great Exhibition of the North. Their ambitious plans will showcase fantastic venues across the city and highlight their unique heritage, culture and design. People from across the country can expect an amazing show in summer 2018".

On 1 March 2018, prior to the exhibition's launch, the organisers announced that the arms manufacturer BAE Systems would be one of the three key sponsors; this led to a widespread outcry by the artistic community. Following a high-profile campaign under the banner "Art not Arms", led by artists such as Jill Gibbon and Emily Hesse – who withdrew her work from the exhibition in protest – BAE Systems announced the withdrawal of its financial support on 7 March 2018.

== Venues ==
The exhibition was distributed over the city with over thirty venues and three hub sites including Baltic Centre for Contemporary Art.

== Exhibits ==
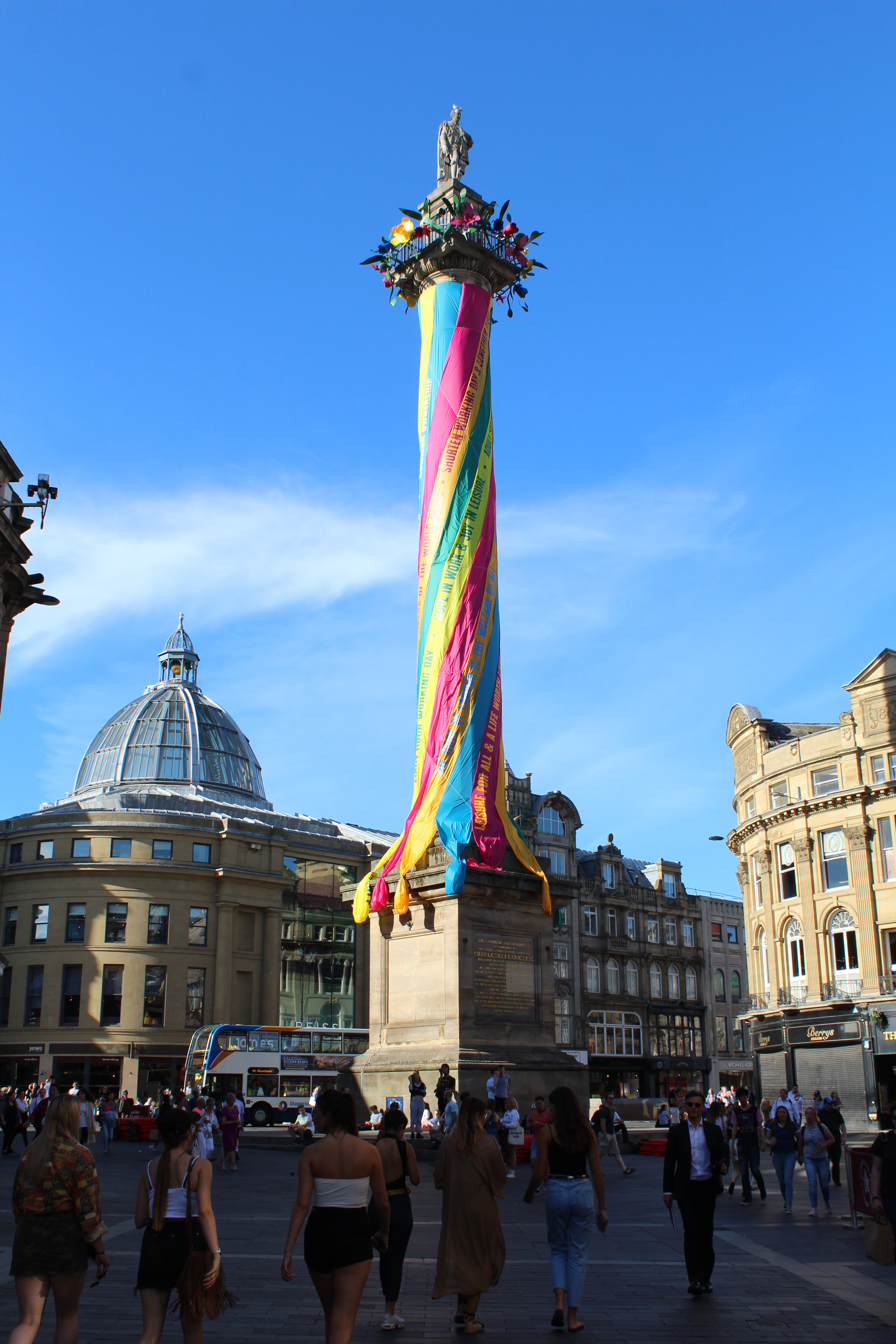
The Workers Maypole

Exhibits included Stephenson's Rocket, lego sculptures, and a large water sculpture Grey's Monument was decorated as The Workers Maypole until 2 August.

Lemn Sissay composed his Anthem of the North for the exhibition.
