= A Checklist of Painters c1200–1994 =

Book by the Courtauld Institute of Art

Checklist of Painters from 1200-1994
- Publisher: Taylor & Francis
- Publication date: 1978
- ISBN: 978-1-134-26413-1

A Checklist of Painters from c1200-1994 is the second edition of a book first published in 1978 by the Courtauld Institute of Art. It contains a list of names of painters, draughtsmen and engravers that are indexed in The Witt Library, named after the art historian Sir Robert Witt, who bequeathed his library to the Courtauld Institute in 1952.

The purpose of the book is to provide a list of metadata on prominent painters, striving in each case to provide a common spelling for the name, nationality, and birth and death dates for Western artists from the early thirteenth century to the present. In the first version, the "present" was defined as 1976 and the list was 40,000 names long, encompassing 337 pages. This second edition corrects mistakes made in the first edition, and lists 66,000 names collected up to 1994 and is 557 pages long. After publication of the second list, the Witt Library continued to collect photographic material on paintings, drawings and engravings and contains over two million reproductions of works by over 70,000 artists.

== Bibliography ==
- The Witt Library Collection (2014). Checklist of Painters from 1200-1994. Taylor & Francis. ISBN 978-1-134-26413-1.
