= Texan English =

Variety of American English spoken in Texas

- Native to: United States
- Region: Texas
- Ethnicity: Texans
- Language family: Indo-European: Germanic; West Germanic; Ingvaeonic; Anglo–Frisian; Anglic; English; North American English; American English; Southern American English; Texan English
- Early forms: Old English: Middle English; Early Modern English
- Writing system: Latin (English alphabet); American Braille

Language codes
- ISO 639-3: –
- Glottolog: None
- IETF: en-u-sd-ustx

Texan English is the array of American English dialects spoken in Texas, primarily falling under Southern U.S. English. As one nationwide study states, the typical Texan accent is a "Southern accent with a twist". The "twist" refers to features of inland Southern U.S., declining coastal Southern U.S., and South Midland U.S. accents combining in different ways throughout the state as a result of Texas's settlement history. In fact, there is no single accent that covers all of Texas and few dialect features are unique to Texas alone. The newest and most innovative Southern U.S. accent features are best reported in Lubbock, Odessa, somewhat Houston and variably Dallas, though general features of this same dialect are found throughout the state, with several exceptions: Abilene and somewhat Austin, Corpus Christi, and El Paso appear to align more with Western or Midland U.S. accents than Southern ones.

== History ==
After Mexico gained independence from Spain in 1821, Mexican Texas legally permitted an influx of American settlers mainly from the Southern United States, who within a decade outnumbered Hispanics in Texas, making English as common as Spanish in central and north Texas. After Texas became an independent republic in 1836, English, with its distinct Southern influences, became the predominant language.

== Research ==
Some linguists draw dialect boundaries based upon phonological (sound-pattern) differences and others on lexical (word-usage) differences, leading to various views on how to classify dialects in Texas, often by dividing the state into an eastern versus a western dialect region. 20th-century lexical research delimited Texas into two "layers": a southern Texas layer along the Mexican border with several Spanish loanwords and a central Texas layer settled by speakers of German and other European languages amidst a dominant Anglo-American settlement. 21st-century phonological research reveals accents in Texas grouped in a way not easy to demarcate in terms of simple geographical boundaries, and ongoing research reveals an urban–rural divide within Texas becoming more significant than a region-wide divide.

Some linguists propose that urbanization, geographic and social mobility, and the mass media have homogenized the speech of the United States to a national norm. Due to rapid urbanization, increasing dominance of high tech industries, and massive migrations, Texan speech has been reshaped as well, especially since 1990. The general tendency in the phonology of Texas English is that mergers expand at the expense of distinctions, although traditional Southern-style Texan English preserved older phonemic distinctions. Since much of the traditional regional vocabulary concerned farming and rural life, these terms are now disappearing or being replaced by technical terms.

=== Urban–rural contrast ===
As stated above, an internal rural–urban split is emerging within Texan English, meaning that most traditionally Southern (or stereotypically Texan) features remain strong in rural areas but tend to disappear in large urban areas and small cities. The urban-rural linguistic split mainly affects Southern-style phonological phenomena like the pen-pin merger, the loss of the offglide in /aɪ/, and upgliding diphthongs, all of which are now recessive in metropolitan areas. Meanwhile, some traditional grammatical features like y'all and fixin' to are expanding to non-natives in metropolitan areas as well as to the Hispanic population.

== Phonology ==
Essentially all Texas English phonologically falls under the Southeastern super-dialect region of the United States and often specifically the Southern dialect region, though noticeably not the cities of El Paso, Abilene, and Austin, and not particularly Houston and Corpus Christi. Moreover, as of 21st-century research, the accents of Dallas show enormous variability.

- Of the three possible stages of the Southern Vowel Shift, the first two stages occur throughout Texas, except in El Paso, Abilene, Austin, and Corpus Christi—the first stage alone appears in Houston. This means monophthongization of /aɪ/ in many contexts (/aɪ/ → [aː]) and lowering of /eɪ/ → [ɛɪ] (the two of which also result in Southern drawling: /æ/ → [ɛ(j)ə]) and /ɛ/ → [e(j)ə]).
  - Monophthongization of /aɪ/ in all contexts, even before voiceless consonants, is a linguistic innovation concentrated in the Texas Panhandle and North Texas: the whole northern half of the state (except Abilene). This makes words like mite, rice, life, type, etc. sound like [maːʔ], [ɹaːs], [laːf], and [tʰaːp].
  - A study of Texas Triangle English shows a strong orientation of primarily young, female, and urban speakers towards a diphthongization of /aɪ/ in all contexts. In fact, the monophthongization of /aɪ/ has left Texas Triangle speech almost entirely. 89% of the speakers born in the 1980s use diphthongal realizations of /aɪ/, whereas only 11% use monophthongal or intermediate realizations of /aɪ/.
- The cot-caught merger of the two historical vowels sounds /ɔ/ and /ɒ/, in words like caught and cot or stalk and stock, is becoming increasingly common throughout the United States, thus affecting Southwestern and even many Southeastern dialects, towards a merged vowel [ɑ]. The ANAE reports a completed merger in Amarillo, Odessa, and variably El Paso, but the rest of Texas is also rapidly transitioning towards the merger.
- A few younger speakers realize the TRAP vowel /æ/, unlike typical Southerners, as open front [a], which is more in line with the Western U.S. dialect. This lowering occurs only in speakers with the cot-caught merger, and is not yet as common as in California and Canada.
- Three mergers before /l/ are recorded in some Texas English: the fill–feel merger (most concentrated from the Panhandle down to San Antonio), the fell–fail merger, and the full–fool merger.
- Non-rhoticity has reversed on a massive scale, as in most of the Southern U.S., and is now only heard in some older speakers.

== Grammar ==
Texas English may use many grammatical constructions typically associated with Southern U.S. English, including fixin' to, multiple modals like might could and should oughta (reportedly used by every social class and, as of the 1980s Linguistic Atlas of the Gulf States, predominately in Upper and Lower East Texas), and plural verbal -s as in Our father and mother helps used by both Black and (somewhat less commonly) white Texans.

== Vocabulary ==
Many of these lexical terms are shared with the Midland and Southern dialects generally:

- buzzard: vulture
- blue norther: The term blue norther refers to a weather phenomenon that often appears in the temperate zones all over the world (including Texas). It is a quickly moving autumnal cold front which drops the temperatures rapidly and brings along rain and after a period of blue skies and cold weather. The derivation of this term is unclear. Some people say that the term refers to a norther (borealis/north wind) which sweeps "out of the Panhandle under a blue-black sky" – from the heat to the blue black cold. Others suggest that blue norther denotes the color of the sky that appears after the bad weather front has passed. Yet others say that people associate blue with the cold that the front brings along. Variants of this term are blue whistler, blue darter and blue blizzard. Whereas the term blue whistler is also used in Texas the two latter terms are from out of state. Blue norther, however, is purely Texan. Since Spanish times, the effect of blue norther has been noted in Texas and this phenomenon has often been exaggerated. But contrary to the belief of many people, blue norther is not unique to Texas.
- bowie knife: a long hunting knife (pronounced boo-ee). Named for Alamo hero Jim Bowie.
- dogie: calf.
- fixin' to: a future-tense modal verb analogous to "about to" or "going to" in much of American English. E.g., "I'm fixin' to leave for school."
- geddup: outfit (clothing) ["get up" but pronounced with accent meaning an outfit or costume typically meaning an exceptional context and may be negative or positive connotation]
- howdy: a general greeting; a shortened form of "How do you do?"
- looker: an attractive woman
- maverick: stray or unbranded.
- motte (mot): The term motte or mot refers to a small grove of trees in open grasslands. It was first introduced by Irish immigrants in the 1830s. They brought this term from Ireland where people used to call similar woods this way. In the United States one hears of motte only in Texas.
- plumb: superlative adjective, equivalent to "absolutely" or "very much". E.g., "He's plumb out of luck."
- pole cat: a skunk
- shinnery: a well-known term in western Texas for a shinnery oak or a sand shinnery oak. These trees grow in Texas, western Oklahoma, and eastern New Mexico. The term shinnery can also mean the area or landscape in which shinnery oaks grow.
- spindletop: a gushing oil well
- tank: stock pond.
- tumpt: to knock over. Tumble.
- varmint: a wild or rascally animal, especially a mammal (sometimes used endearingly). Derivative of vermin.
- y'all: a second-person plural pronoun; a shortened form of "you all"
- (over) yonder: an adverbial used to designate a faraway place; analogous to "over there"

=== South Texas vocabulary ===
- acequia (from Spanish acequia): an irrigation ditch.
- arroyo (from Spanish arroyo): a gulch, ravine, creek bed
- caliche (from Spanish caliche): a hardened layer of calcium carbonate in the ground.
- chaparral (from Spanish chaparral): brush-covered terrain
- frijoles (from Spanish frijol): beans
- hacienda (from Spanish hacienda): the main house of a ranch
- icehouse: a term used in the San Antonio area to mean a convenience store. Elsewhere, this denotes an open-air tavern, the origin of which dates back to the times when fresh beer was stored in "ice houses" placed strategically along beer delivery routes for local and regional delivery. Over time these locations began to serve cold beer, since it was stored there already, and other conveniences, such as food items, cigarettes, etc. In more modern times, the surviving ice houses are little more than open air beer bars. It is the "open air" feature (often obtained with multiple garage doors in place of walls), in fact, that distinguishes an ice house from a tavern.
- llano (from Spanish llano): a plain
- olla (from Spanish olla): an earthenware pot or crock
- pelado (from Spanish pelado): a catch-all term for low-class and popular-culture people. Now considered an offensive and derogatory word
- pilon (from Spanish pilón): a bonus, lagniappe
- reata (from Spanish reata): a rope or lasso
- resaca (from Spanish resaca): a small body of water
- toro (from Spanish toro): a bull
- vaquero (from Spanish vaquero): a cowboy

=== Central Texas vocabulary ===
- clook, cluck: (from German Glucke) a setting hen
- cook cheese, kochcase: (from German Kochkäse = (literally) smearing cheese) a soft cheese cooked and poured into jars
- grass sack or gunny sack: a burlap bag
- icebox: a refrigerator or freezer (used interchangeably to refer to both)
- plunder room: a storage room
- roping rope: a lariat
- settee: (from settle) a couch or sofa
- smearcase: (from German Schmierkäse) cottage cheese
- tarviated road: a paved or blacktopped road
- tool house: a toolshed
- wood house: a woodshed

=== Statewide Spanish loanwords ===
Due to Spain's past influence in Texas, the vocabulary of Texas is much more influenced by Spanish than the vocabulary of other states. Some of the Texan terms that originated from Spanish are listed below.

- esplanade: Sometimes grassy strips between two divided highway lanes are called esplanade.
- jalapeño: The Spanish word jalapeño, which refers to a type of hot pepper from Mexico, was once solely Texan. The term is now well known in other states of the U.S. and many other countries.
- lariat (from Spanish la reata): rope or lasso.
- pinto or paint (from Spanish pinto = painted): familiar spotted or piebald Western pony.
- remuda (from Spanish remudar = to exchange): spare horse or remount; mainly used in West Texas.
- Tejano: The noun Tejano is derived from the Spanish adjective tejano or tejana (feminine). It refers to a Hispanic Texan whose heritage is from Texas before Texas was incorporated into the United States. This term also embraces cultural manifestations in language, literature, art, music, cuisine, etc. already in 1824 the author of the Mexican Constitution of 1824, Miguel Ramos Arispe, called the citizens of Texas tejanos. After the Mexican War the term coahuiltejano which contains the term tejano denoted the residents of the Mexican state Coahuila y Tejas. Already in 1833 Hispanics in Texas started to identify themselves as tejanos. In 1855 when the San Antonio newspaper El Bejareño reported a letter by José Antonio Navarro read at the second meeting of the Spanish-speaking members of the Bexar County Democratic party the term Méjico-Tejano first appeared in print. Tejano occurred more often in speech and texts when the political activity of Hispanics in Texas became pronounced, in particular since the Chicano movement of the mid-1960s started. This term is common enough that it is considered an item in the Texas lexicon. Other and broader terms used for the same ethnic group are Hispanic American, Latin American, Mexican American, Mexican, and Chicano.
- wrangler or horse wrangler (Anglicized form of the Spanish word caballerango): a groom; the typical Texas wrangler was "a bachelor and worked with several outfits over the course of his hard career".

== In the media ==
Texan English frequently shows up in the media. In the 1950s and 1960s, many Hollywood western movies like Giant, Hud, and The Alamo were set in Texas. In those movies, Hollywood stars like James Dean, Rock Hudson, Dennis Hopper, Paul Newman, and Patricia Neal first had to learn how to speak Texan English and were instructed by native Texans. Also the famous TV series Dallas was often characterized by Texan English.

Texas Instruments sometimes uses Texan English in its products. The TIFORM software for its TI-990 minicomputer sometimes displayed "Shut 'er Down Clancey She's a-Pumping Mud" as a humorous error message.

The Texan accent gained nationwide fame with the presidency of native Texan Lyndon B. Johnson. A lifelong resident of the Texas Hill Country, Johnson's thick accent was a large part of his personality and brought attention and fame to the dialect.

The Texan dialect gained fame again when George W. Bush started to serve as president. He had moved to West Texas at the age of two and has since retained the Texan dialect. In his speech, words like "America" sometimes sound like "Amur-kah" or even just like "Mur-kah". Former U.S. Secretary of State Rex Tillerson also speaks with a distinctively Texan accent.

== Spanglish and Tejano English ==
After the Mexican Revolution of 1910–1920, a large number of Spanish-speaking Mexicans immigrated to Texas, migration slowed down in the mid-20th century only to increase significantly since 1990, driving the development of a young Spanish-influenced dialect of Texan English: Tejano English. Due to hundreds of years of Spanish and later Mexican intermingling, around 6 million (ca. 29%) people in Texas speak Spanish as the first language. Data from 2006 shows that use of Spanish was still increasing. Due to the high number of Spanish speakers in Texas, Spanish has a high impact on many of the English dialect spoken in Texas. Many Mexican Americans in Texas speak their own variety of English which has many Spanish features (terms, phonology, etc.), Tejano English, a Chicano English dialect mostly spoken by working-class Mexican Americans. A very distinctive feature of that dialect is the /-t, d/-deletion in words which contain a /t/ or /d/ in the final position.

== African American English in Texas ==
Texas, which has the highest African American population among all US states, has developed its own unique dialects of African American Vernacular English (AAVE). These dialects were heavily influenced by rural farming communities from 1890 and 1940. Since the Great Migration, these dialects saw rapid influences from more urban varieties of AAVE, especially among individuals born after World War II. African American Vernacular English remains largely unrecognized in K-12 education in the state which may present difficulties in standardized testing among speakers.
