= Pacific Northwest English =

Dialect of American English

- Region: Cascadia, Northwestern United States (Oregon, Northern California, British Columbia and Washington)
- Language family: Indo-European: Germanic; West Germanic; Ingvaeonic; Anglo-Frisian; English; North American English; Pacific Northwest English
- Early forms: Old English: Middle English; Early Modern English

Language codes
- ISO 639-3: –

Pacific Northwest English (also known, in American linguistics, as Northwest English) is a variety of North American English spoken in the U.S. states of Washington and Oregon, sometimes also including Idaho and the Canadian province of British Columbia. Due to the internal diversity within Pacific Northwest English, current studies remain inconclusive about whether it is best regarded as a dialect of its own, separate from Western American English or even California English or Canadian English, with which it shares its major phonological features. The dialect region contains a highly diverse and mobile population, which is reflected in the historical and continuing development of the variety.

== History ==
The linguistic traits that flourish throughout the Pacific Northwest attest to a culture that transcends boundaries. Historically, this hearkens back to the early years of colonial expansion by the British and Americans, when the entire region was considered a single area and people of all different mother tongues and nationalities used Chinook Jargon (along with English and French) to communicate with each other. Until the Oregon Treaty of 1846, it was identified as being either Oregon Country (by the Americans) or Columbia (by the British).

Linguists immediately after World War II tended to find few patterns unique to the Western region, as among other things, Chinook Jargon and other "slang words" (despite Chinook Jargon being an actual separate language in and of itself, individual words from it like salt chuck, muckamuck, siwash and tyee were and still are used in Pacific Northwest English) were pushed away in favor of having a "proper, clean" dialect. Several decades later, linguists began noticing emerging characteristics of Pacific Northwest English, although it remains close to the standard American accent.

Note that "Pacific Northwest" is primarily used in the US. In Canada, the region north of the Canada-US border is generally called "West Coast", but residents of the Lower Mainland and Vancouver Island still typically consider themselves part of the greater Pacific Northwest region.

== Phonology ==
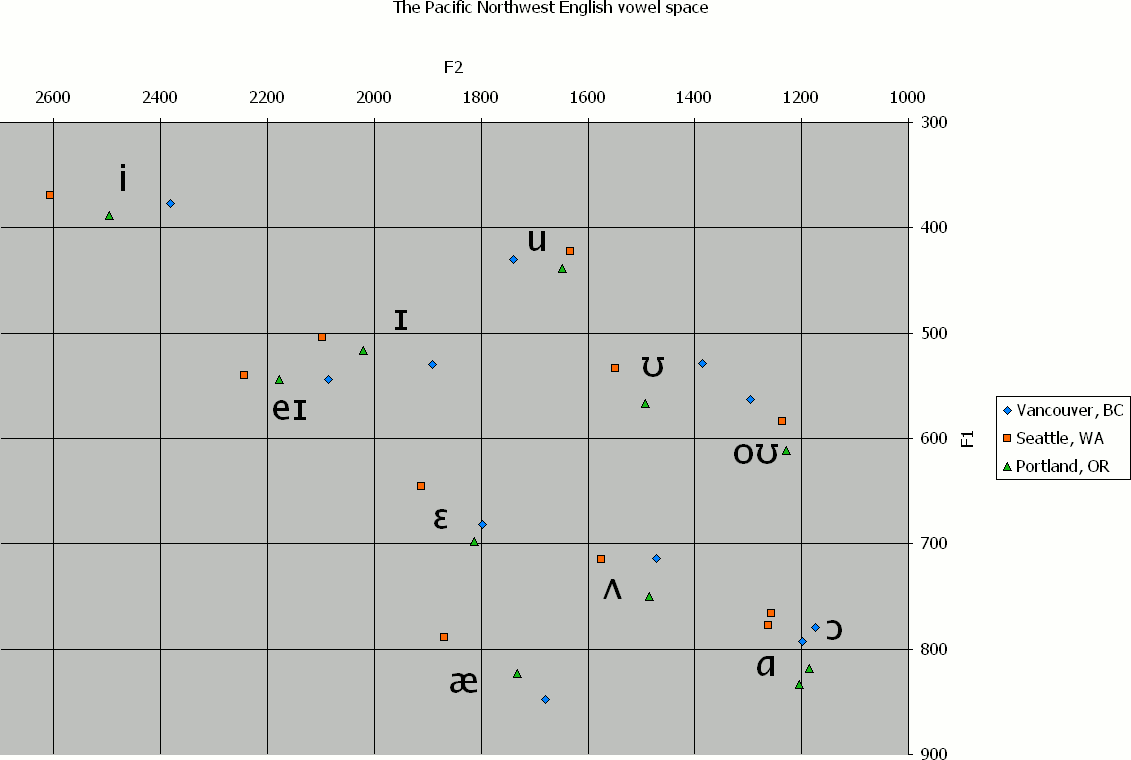
The Pacific Northwest English vowel space. Based on TELSUR data from Labov et al. The /ɑ/ and /ɔ/ are indistinguishable in the F1/F2 means for three speakers from Vancouver, British Columbia, two speakers from Seattle, Washington, and three from Portland, Oregon.

=== Commonalities with both Canada and California ===
- Pacific Northwest English has all the phonological mergers typical of North American English and, more specifically, all the mergers typical of Western American English, including the cot–caught merger.
- Younger speakers of Pacific Northwest English also show features of the Canadian/California Vowel Shift, which moves front vowels through a lowering of the tongue:
  - /ɑ/ is backed and sometimes rounded to become [ɒ]. Most Pacific Northwest speakers have undergone the cot–caught merger. A notable exception occurs with some speakers born before roughly the end of World War II. In addition, one study found that in Portland, Oregon, a distinction might still be made by some speakers, especially women.
  - Throughout the Pacific Northwest, /æ/ is often backed towards [a] among younger speakers.
- There are also conditional raising processes of open front vowels. These processes are often more extreme than in Canada and the North Central United States.
  - Before the velar nasal /ŋ/, /æ/ becomes /eɪ/. This change makes for minimal pairs such as rang and rain, both having the same vowel /eɪ/.
  - Among some speakers in Portland and southern Oregon, /æ/ is sometimes raised and diphthongized to [eə] or [ɪə] before the nasal consonants [m] and [n]. This is typical throughout the U.S.
  - While /æ/ raising is present in Canadian, Californian, and Pacific Northwest English, differences exist between the groups most commonly presenting these features. Pre-nasal /æ/ raising is more prominent in Washingtonian speakers than in Canadian speakers.
- The close central rounded vowel [ʉ] or close back unrounded vowel [ɯ] for /u/ is found in Portland and some areas of Southern Oregon, as well as in Seattle and Vancouver. This fronting does not happen before /l/, where the vowel is backed instead. This is common throughout the country.

=== Commonalities with Canada ===
These commonalities are shared with Canada and the North Central United States.

- Pacific Northwestern speakers tend to realize [oʊ] as in boat and [eɪ] as in bait with almost monophthongal values ([o] and [e]) instead of the diphthongs typical of most of the U.S.
  - In Cowlitz County, Washington, this is actually reversing, and the onset and upglide of /oʊ/ are getting further apart in apparent time.
- /ɛ/ and, in the northern Pacific Northwest, /æ/ tend to merge with /eɪ/ before the voiced velar plosive /ɡ/: egg and leg are pronounced to rhyme with plague and vague, with the merged vowel being in between /ɛ/ and /eɪ/. This is most frequently found in the areas north of Seattle, and is a feature shared by many northern Midwestern dialects (many settlers of Western Washington were from the Upper Midwest, often Scandinavians from Minnesota, Wisconsin, and Michigan) and the Utah accent. In addition, sometimes the vowel in bag is raised toward /e:/.
  - While /æ/ raising is present in Canadian, Californian, and Pacific Northwest English, differences exist between the groups most commonly presenting these features. /æ/ raising is more common in younger Canadian speakers and less common in younger Washingtonian speakers.
  - /ɛ/ and /eɪ/ may continue to be distinguished before /g/ by some speakers through length, with /ɛ/ being shorter than /eɪ/.

=== Commonalities with California ===
- Back vowels of the California Shift: In speakers born around the 1960s, and also among working-class young-adult females in Portland, (though not in Seattle,) there is a tendency to move the tongue forward in the first element of the diphthong /oʊ/. This is reminiscent of Midland, Mid-Atlantic, Southern U.S. English, as well as California English, but not Canadian English. This fronting does not appear before /m/ and /n/, for example, in the word home.
- Absence of Canadian raising: For most speakers, /aʊ/ (though, in Seattle, not /aɪ/) remains mostly lax before voiceless obstruents, although some variation has been reported. This likens the Pacific Northwest accent with Californian accents and contrasts it with Canadian (notably, though, most speakers from Vancouver, British Columbia, if included, do raise /aʊ/.)
- A recognizable though nonstandard trait is raising the short i /ɪ/ sound to an almost long ee [i] sound before ng, even when the g is dropped, such that the local pronunciation of syllable-medial or -final -ing [iŋ], even with G-dropping ([in]), takes on the same vowel quality as, but remains shorter than, the rime of bean or the traditional British pronunciation of been when stressed ([iːn]).

=== Miscellaneous characteristics ===
- Some speakers perceive or produce the pairs /ɛn/ and /ɪn/ close to each other, for example, resulting in a merger between pen and pin, most notably for some speakers in Southern Oregon and the Inland Northwest. Examples of this merger are evident in Eugene, Oregon, and Spokane, Washington.
- Some speakers in Cowlitz County may have the bull–bowl merger.
- Some speakers may have the mary-marry-merry merger, while other speakers do not.
- "Up-speak" or high rising terminal contours: Some speakers in the Pacific Northwest, particularly Portland, may exhibit up-speak, a rising intonation at the end of declarative sentences, also associated with certain New England English dialects (The Pacific Northwest was substantially settled by people of Yankee stock).
- Vocal fry, the use of creaky voice in everyday speech, stands out as a documented feature of Pacific Northwest English. More broadly, research on American English speakers has found that American women are more likely than men to use vocal fry.. A 2009 study by John M. Riebold from University of Washington found women from Portland, Oregon were significantly more likely than men to use vocal fry extensively.
- In Cowlitz County, Washington, outside the Mormon culture region, there are very few phonological differences between the speech of Latter-day Saints (Mormons) and non-Mormons. The only statistically significant difference found was that Mormons had a higher F2 formant in /l/ following /i/, /oʊ/ and /ʊ/. This is in contrast to other studies finding some differences between Mormon and non-Mormon speech within the Mormon culture region.

== Lexicon ==
Several English terms originated in or are largely unique to the region:

- cougar: mountain lion
- duff: forest litter
- jojos: variation of potato wedges
- (high) muckamuck: an important person or person of authority, usually a pompous one (from Chinook Jargon, where it means 'eats a lot; much food')
- pop: soft drink
- potato bug: woodlouse
- skookum: (referring to a person) strong, powerful; (referring to a thing) big, good (from Chinook Jargon)
- spodie: An outdoor high school party in which attendees pay for and drink from a central container of mixed alcohol and sugary drinks.
- sunbreak: a passage of sunlight in the clouds during dark, rainy weather (typical west of the Cascade Mountains)
- tolo: Sadie Hawkins dance

== See also ==
- California English
- Canadian English
- American English
- Chinook Jargon
- Chinook Jargon use by English-language speakers
