= Northern American English (disambiguation) =

Northern American English may refer to:

- Northern American English, a variety of American English used in the northern United States, comprising:
  - North Central American English
  - Inland Northern American English
  - General American
  - Western American English

== See also ==
- North American English
- Northern America
- Northern England English
