= Northern English =

Northern English may refer to:

- People from Northern England
- Northern England English, English language in Northern England
- Northern American English, English language in Northern United States
- A historical term for Northumbria or area governed by the Viking-Age rulers of Bamburgh

== See also ==
- Southern English (disambiguation)
- Northern American English (disambiguation)
