= Pronunciation of English ⟨ng⟩ =

Consonant sounds associated with the digraph ⟨ng⟩

In English, the digraph ⟨ng⟩ often represents the velar nasal, as in long /lɒŋ/ and nothing /ˈnʌθɪŋ/. In other cases, it represents a sequence of the velar nasal followed by the voiced velar stop, as in longer /ˈlɒŋɡər/, which had been the original pronunciation of the digraph up until Early Modern English when the /ɡ/ sound was lost in most words, giving /ŋ/ a phonemic status in English. Another pronunciation is /ndʒ/, as in angel /ˈeɪndʒəl/ and one pronunciation of longevity /lɒnˈdʒɛvɪti/ (alternatively pronounced with /ŋdʒ/, /lɒŋˈdʒɛvɪti/, by analogy with long).

== NG-coalescence ==
In Old English and Middle English, any ng sequence stood for two sounds: the velar nasal [ŋ] followed by the voiced velar stop [ɡ]. The velar nasal did not have a phonemic status, being a mere allophone of /n/, as in Spanish or Italian (or as in Modern Standard English in words such as Bengali or Vancouver, where there is a free variation between an alveolar nasal and a velar nasal). From Early Modern English onwards, the oral stop [ɡ] ceased to be pronounced in educated London speech, giving /ŋ/ a phonemic status according to some analyses (some scholars still reject it as a phoneme and consider it to be a realization of the underlying /nɡ/). This is termed NG-coalescence by John C. Wells. There are certain varieties of English where the ng-coalescence did not take place, such as those spoken in the western part of the English Midlands and the middle north of England, such as Brummie, Mancunian and Scouse. Since the underlying form in those dialects is /nɡ/ (i.e. the speakers perceive [n] and [ŋ] to be the same sound), the g is literally dropped for those speakers who use [ɪn] etc. for -‍ing.

== G-dropping ==
G-dropping in English is a linguistic variable by which what in standard English is /ɪŋ/ is realized as [ɪn], [ɨ̞n] or [ən] in unstressed morpheme-final (often word-final) syllables. In most varieties of English, G-dropping does not involve actually omitting a /ɡ/ sound; there is no /ɡ/ sound present in the standard pronunciation to be dropped. The name "G-dropping" is a reference to the way this process is represented in spelling: Since in English /ŋ/ is typically spelled ⟨ng⟩ and /n/ is spelled ⟨n⟩, the process of replacing /ŋ/ with /n/ causes the ⟨g⟩ to "drop" from the spelling. Sociolinguists often refer to this variable by the notation (ing).

G-dropping is most frequently observed in present participles, whose -‍ing suffix meets the criteria for the variation. For example, with G-dropping, the word singing may be pronounced as [ˈsɪŋɪn], [ˈsɪŋɨ̞n] or [ˈsɪŋən], and spelled as singin' to emphasize that the g has been "dropped". G-dropping also occurs, although at lower rates of frequency than in present participles, in other words ending in the syllable -ing, including nouns such as ceiling and morning.

According to phonetician John C. Wells, "it is safe... to make the generalization" that G-dropping exists in all communities where there is an English-speaking working class, the only exception being in South Africa, where the working class does not have English as a first language. G-dropping is used frequently in pop culture such as music and movies.

=== History ===
G-dropping is a linguistic phenomenon that has been studied by sociolinguists since the 1950s. The origin of G-dropping has been studied by historical linguists since the late 19th century. The contemporary variation between /ɪŋ/ and [ɪn] has its roots in the morphology of Old English. Old English possessed suffixes -ung and -ing, which created verbal nouns, alongside a suffix -inde that created present participles. By the 15th century, the ⟨nd⟩ forms had begun to be replaced by the ⟨ng⟩ forms, creating an alternation between velar and alveolar suffixes for the same functions that is at the root of the modern alternation between /ɪŋ/ and [ɪn]. As Middle English transformed into Modern English, G-dropping became highly correlated with socioeconomic class. It is more common among the lower working class, but is sometimes found in the casual speech of other classes. In some research, G-dropping has been seen to be more common among males than females. It was a fashionable pronunciation in 18th-century England. The stereotypical U-RP pronunciation of huntin', shootin' and fishin' features G-dropping in all three words: [ˈhʌntɪn ˈʃuːtɪn ən ˈfɪʃɪn].

=== Linguistic phenomenon ===
When "dropping a g", the speaker turns the /ɪŋ/ sequence to [ɪn], as in taking [ˈteɪkɪn]. In dialects with the weak vowel merger, such as most varieties of North American English and Australian English, the resulting sequence is [ən], so that taking with a dropped g is pronounced the same as taken, as [ˈteɪkən, -kn̩, -kŋ̍]. The realization [ɨ̞n] (with a lowered close central unrounded vowel) appears in both types of dialects. In dialects without the merger (such as U-RP), the words are distinct as [ˈteɪkɪn] vs. [ˈteɪkən, -kn̩, -kŋ̍], with only the latter word being subject to syllabic consonant formation. However, in some dialects, the variant [ən] exists despite the lack of the weak vowel merger. An example of such dialect is Cockney, in which wireless has been reported to be pronounced [ˈwɑːlɪs] even in broadest speech. In that dialect, taking can be pronounced [ˈtæɪkən] (more often that not with a sounded schwa, so not [ˈtæɪʔ(k)ŋ̍] etc.) instead of [ˈtæɪkɪn], though both are possible. The pronunciation with [ən] etc. is perceived as strongly non-standard by speakers of RP, in which the most casual variants are [ˈteɪkɪn] and [ˈteɪkɨ̞n]. The latter is usually not homophonous with taken [ˈteɪkən, -kn̩, -kŋ̍] as the final vowels in these words differ in height (though /ə/ can be as close as [ɘ] in the vicinity of alveolars) as well as in the fact that [ɨ̞] does not participate in syllabic consonant formation, being phonemically /ɪ/.

However, /ɪŋ/ is also realized as [in] when the raising of /ɪ/ to [i] before the underlying /ŋ/ (found in various dialects of North American English) is applied even after the "g" is dropped, leading to a variant pronunciation [ˈteɪkin] by speakers from not just California but also from other Western states, Midwestern areas including the Upper Midwest and even Canada. Speakers who use the [in] variant use it only for the underlying /ɪŋ/, which makes taking with a dropped "g" no longer homophonous with taken. A reverse phenomenon has been reported to occur in New Zealand English, in which even the stressed instances of the KIT vowel are central [ə] (with the height being somewhat variable) that is not distinct from the schwa phoneme /ə/ (hence the stereotypical NZE pronunciation of "fish and chips" as /ˌfəʃ ən ˈtʃəps/, sounding like "fush and chups" to Australians). However, the typical allophone before any phonetic velar nasal (stressed or otherwise) is [ɪ], as in other dialects. When the G is dropped, the behavior mirrors the General American pattern ([ˈtæɪkən] etc.)

Monosyllabic words that have a stressed "-ing" ending like sing or king are not affected by G-dropping. When writing, an apostrophe can be used in place of the ⟨g⟩ to indicate it has been dropped.

There are some syntactic restraints on G-dropping as well. Most commonly, the feature will be found mostly with progressives and particles, and not as commonly in adjectives.

=== Modern usage ===
==== Demographics ====
A study from the 1950s previously mentioned showed that southern areas of the US are more likely to use G-dropping, with young men being the higher demographic. Many in North America associate this linguistic feature with lower class societies. This has been reinforced by pop culture references where the less educated characters were more likely to be seen dropping the "g", for example in Uncle Tom's Cabin.

As previously said, G-dropping is more prevalent in some southern areas of the United States; and we can see a clear example in Appalachian English. A foundational study by Wolfram and Christian's Appalachian Speech which analyzed counties in West Virginia found that the dropping of "g" was clearly more predominant than in other parts of the country.

This linguistic feature can also be seen in African-American English. A study showed that African-American English speakers drop the "G" 54% of the time, and the proportion is even higher for those in the working class.

==== Popular culture ====
===== Music =====
Although G-dropping has been heavily stigmatized in some dialects, it is not perceived as abnormal when sung and occurs commonly in popular music. Both the sound change and spelling are used for example Bob Dylan's Blowin' in the Wind employs ⟨n'⟩ to explicitly indicate G-dropping.

In African American Vernacular English, the phonological action of G-dropping is seen as commonplace in the language, so much so that this trait bleeds into other facets of the culture such as music. Arguably, the genre of hip-hop has been most influential on young African American urban communities. There are several linguistic aspects to be studied, and G-dropping happens to be amongst them when in songs, words like "something" or "thumping" are pronounced as [ˈsʌmθɨ̞n] and [ˈθʌmpɨ̞n].

==== Movies ====
G-dropping can be heard in various types of Canadian media, especially their movies. G-dropping can be heard in the 1970 Canadian movie Goin' Down the Road. The film follows two boys who travel from an impoverished, rural area to Toronto in search of fame. The G-dropping is used to emphasize the socio-economic position of the two main characters; G-dropping is common in the working class of Cape Breton Island.

== Changes affecting the -‍thing suffix ==
In Cockney, the -‍thing suffix, often affected by the G-dropping like -‍ing, can be pronounced with a voiceless [k] instead. This yields [ˈnʌfɪŋk] for "nothing". This [k] can be preglottalized ([ˈnʌfɪŋʔk]) just like the underlying voiceless stops in "think", "limp" and "tint": [fɪŋʔk, lɪmʔp, tɪnʔt]. However, the nasal is frequently lost in all of these cases, being realized instead as a mere nasalization of the preceding vowel: [ˈnʌfɪ̃ʔk] etc. The [k] can disappear too, leaving a mere glottal stop behind: [ˈnʌfɪ̃ʔ], just like /p/ and /t/ in the same environment. John C. Wells states these realizations of -‍thing are best analyzed as /θɪŋk/.
