= Western American English =

Variety of American English

- Western U.S. English
- Region: Western United States
- Language family: Indo-European: Germanic; West Germanic; North Sea Germanic; Anglo–Frisian; Anglic; English; North American English; American English; Western American English
- Early forms: Old English: Middle English; Early Modern English
- Dialects: California English; Pacific Northwest English

Language codes
- ISO 639-3: –
- Glottolog: west2920 Western American English
- Linguasphere: 52-ABA-cgd
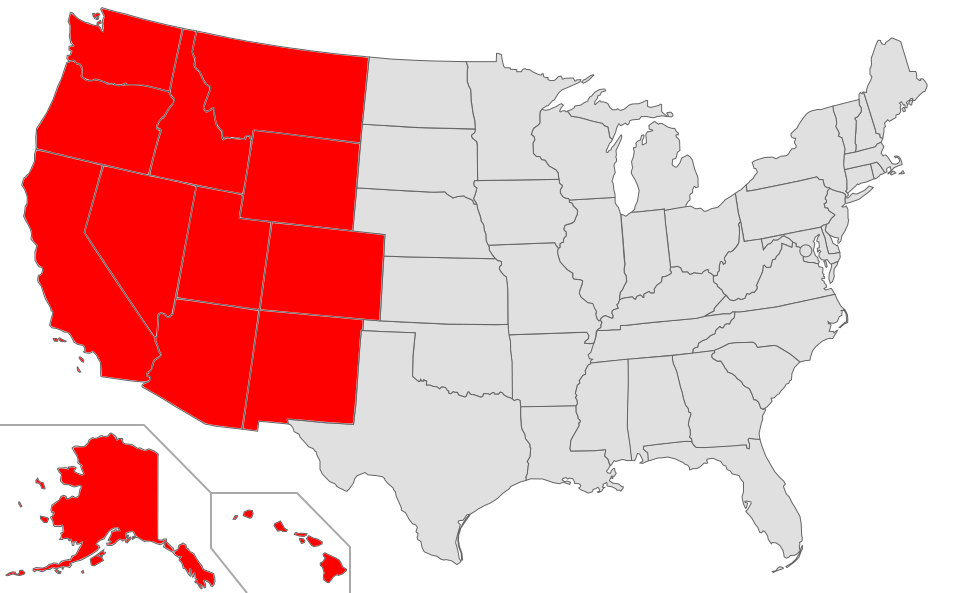
- States where Western American English and its dialects are spoken

Western American English (also known as Western U.S. English) is a variety of American English that largely unites the entire Western United States as a single dialect region, including the states of California, Nevada, Arizona, Utah, New Mexico, Colorado, Wyoming, and Montana. It also generally encompasses Washington, Oregon, and Idaho, some of whose speakers are classified under Pacific Northwest English.

The West was the last area in the United States to be reached during the gradual westward expansion of settlement by English speakers and its history shows considerable mixing and leveling of the linguistic patterns of other regions. Therefore, since the settlement populations are relatively young when compared with other regions, the American West continues to be a dialect region in formation. According to the 2006 Atlas of North American English, as a very broad generalization, Western U.S. accents are differentiated from Southern U.S. accents in maintaining /aɪ/ as a diphthong, from Northern U.S. accents by fronting /u/ (the GOOSE vowel), and from both by consistently showing the low back merger (the merger of the vowel sounds in words like cot and caught). Furthermore, in speakers born from the 1980s onward, the related low-back-merger shift has been spreading throughout the Western States, as well as throughout the entire United States. The standard Canadian accent also aligns with these defining features, though it typically includes certain additional vowel differences.

== Phonology and phonetics ==
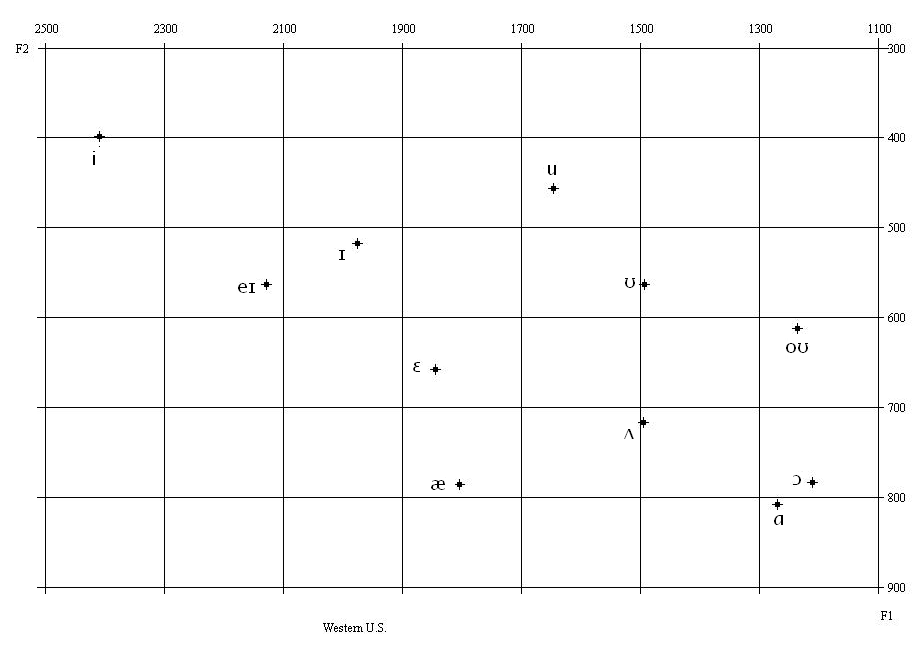
Western American English vowel formant plot

The Western regional accent of American English is somewhat variable and not necessarily distinct from "General American" or from the speech of younger or educated Americans nationwide. Western American English is defined primarily by two phonological features: the cot-caught merger (as distinct from most traditional Northern and Southern U.S. English) and the fronting of the /u/ (GOOSE) vowel but not the /oʊ/ (GOAT) vowel. This fronting is distinct from most Southern and Mid-Atlantic American English, in which both of those vowels are fronted, as well as from most Northern U.S. English, in which both of these remain backed.

Like most Canadian dialects and younger General American, /ɑ/ (LOT/PALM) allophones remain back and may be either rounded or unrounded due to the low back merger: the merger between the sounds /ɑ/ and /ɔ/ (THOUGHT), commonly represented as words like cot and caught, or pod and pawed, becoming perfect homophones. Linguists believe this is the cause of, or at least related to, more and more Western speakers in general lowering or retracting the TRAP vowel and the DRESS vowel in a chain shift first associated with California and led by young women: the low-back-merger shift. This shift is also documented in mainland Canadian English. However, unlike in Canada, the raising before voiceless consonants of /aʊ/ does not exist in Western American English and of /aɪ/ is not as consistent and pronounced. Like General American, the West is entirely rhotic, and the Mary–marry–merry merger is complete, so that words like Mary, marry, and merry are all pronounced identically because of the merger of all three of those vowels' sounds when before r.

Notably, though, there are still regions of the West where some speakers do not have a complete merger, most notably San Francisco, California, where younger speakers exhibit the merger more often than older speakers, but also Portland, Oregon, and Cowlitz County, Washington, where an incomplete merger exists for some speakers and where merging is not any more advanced among younger speakers than among older ones.

Although it occurs at least occasionally nationwide, T-glottalization at word boundaries, as in "right ankle", is more common in Western dialects, particularly among younger speakers and women. The use of a full (orally released) rather than syllabic pronunciation of /ən/ in the sequence /-tən/, in words like "kitten" or "mountain", is a minor but noted variant reported in the West, for example among some Californians and younger, female Utah speakers; thus, kitten as [ˈkʰɪʔən] in addition to more General American [ˈkʰɪʔn̩]; however, this feature has also been reported elsewhere in the country, like New Jersey. Men and teenage girls from Utah are also slightly more likely than average to elide the /t/ altogether in these words, and Utahns as a whole are slightly less likely to glottalize the /t/ in general.

A trend evident particularly in some speakers from the Salt Lake City, Utah, and Flagstaff, Arizona, areas, as well as in some Californian and New Mexican English, is the completion of, or transition towards, a full–fool merger. This may be related to scatterings of Western speakers, such as some Utah speakers, generally producing lax pronunciations of the tense front vowels before /l/, such as pronouncing "sale" as "sell" /sɛl/. Southern twang-like monophthongization of /aɪ/ has been sporadically reported in the Southwest, for example in some speakers before /l/ in southern Arizona and Utah. A significant minority of Western speakers have the pin–pen merger or a closeness to the merger, especially around Bakersfield, California, though it is a sound typically associated with Southern American English, which influenced Bakersfield settlers.

Another recognizable trait, particularly in California and the Pacific Northwest, is raising of the short i /ɪ/ sound to an almost long ee [i] sound before ng, even when the g is dropped, such that the local pronunciation of -ing [iŋ], even with G-dropping ([in]), takes on the same vowel quality as, but remains shorter than, a rhyme with bean. The word coding, for example, is pronounced [ˈkoʊdin], homophonous with codeine.

== Vocabulary ==
- barrow pit (variant of "borrow pit"): an excavated area where material has been dug for use as fill at another location
- bear claw: a large stuffed pastry
- buckaroo: cowboy
  - Originating in California, buckaroo is an Anglicization of the Mexican Spanish translation of cowboy vaquero; the corresponding term which originated in Texas is "wrangler" or "horse wrangler", itself an Anglicization of the Mexican caballerango.
- chippie: a woman of loose morals
- coke predominates in eastern New Mexico; pop in the Northwest and Northern Mountain States; and soda in California and Arizona: sweet carbonated soft drink
- firefly: any insect of the Lampyridae family, now widespread nationwide
- frontage road: a service or access road
- hella: very (adverb), much, or many (adjective); originated in the San Francisco Bay Area and now used throughout Northern California
- mud hen: the American coot

== Sub-varieties ==
Several sub-types of the Western dialect appear to be currently in formation, and the West, being an area of especially recent English-speaking settlement, shows relatively low homogeneity and low internal consistency. Additionally, most Mexican-American English is spoken within, and arguably falls under the regional dialect of, the Western United States.

=== Alaska ===
Currently, there is not enough data on the English of Alaska to either include it within Western American English or assign it its own "separate status". Of two documented speakers in Anchorage, their cot-caught merger is completed or transitional, /aʊ/ is not fronted, /oʊ/ is centralized, the placement of /u/ is inconsistent, and ag approaches the sound of egg. Not far from Anchorage, in Alaska's Matanuska-Susitna Valley, is a distinctly Minnesota-like accent due to immigration of Minnesotans to the valley in the 1930s.

=== California ===
A noticeable California Vowel Shift has been observed in the English of (largely younger) speakers scattered throughout California, though especially strong among coastal speakers. This shift involves multiple elements, including that the vowel in words like toe, rose, and go (though remaining back vowels elsewhere in the Western dialect), and the vowel in words like spoon, move, and rude are both pronounced farther forward in the mouth than most other English dialects; at the same time, a lowering chain movement of the front vowels is occurring (identical to the Canadian Vowel Shift), so that, to listeners of other English dialects, sit may approach the sound of set, set may approach sat, and sat may approach sot. This front-vowel lowering is also reported around Portland, Oregon, the hub of a unique Northwestern variety of American English that demonstrates other similarities with Canadian English.

=== Hawaii ===
Studies demonstrate that gender, age, and ability to speak Hawaiian Creole (a language locally called "Pidgin" and spoken by about two-fifths of Hawaii residents) correlate with the recent emergence of different Hawaiian English accents. In a 2013 study of twenty Oʻahu-raised native English speakers, non-Pidgin and male speakers were shown to lower /ɪ/ and /ɛ/; younger speakers of the first group also lowered /æ/, and younger participants in general backed /æ/. Though this movement of these vowels is superficially similar to the California Vowel Shift, it is not believed to be due to a chain shift, though Hawaii residents do have a cot–caught merger, at least among younger speakers. Unlike most Americans, Hawaii residents may not demonstrate any form of /æ/ tensing (even before nasal consonants, as with most Western Americans).

=== New Mexico ===
In New Mexico, the state with the largest Hispanic population by percentage and no Anglo majority population, studies have distinguished the English of English-Spanish bilinguals versus (Anglo) English monolinguals. Research showed the former more likely to participate in monophthongization of /eɪ/ and a recently developing Hispanic English vowel shift. However, this same shift failed to appear in a later study, in which Anglo New Mexicans (and particularly young women) were the ones more likely to engage in an innovative California-like vowel shift, whereas Hispanic speakers raised /æ/ before nasals significantly less, while pronouncing /u/ higher and further back. Many New Mexicans, both Anglo and Hispanic, pronounce the cluster /nj/ in the word new (not the yod-dropping after /n/ of most other Americans). Aside from noting a possible full–fool merger regardless of ethnicity, New Mexican English research has tended to focus on vocabulary: particularly loanwords from New Mexican Spanish, such as the word acequia [əˈseɪkjə] for a ditch; canales [kəˈnɑleɪs] for a type of rain and street gutter; corazón [ˌkʰɔɹəˈsoʊn] for sweetheart, darling, courage, or spirit; nana [ˈnɑnə] for one's grandmother (more widely heard than elsewhere in the U.S.); and vigas [ˈvigəs] for rafters. The New Mexican chile pepper has had such a large cultural impact that it has even been entered into the Congressional Record spelled as chile instead of chili.

=== Pacific Northwest ===
The states of Oregon and Washington show a mixture of features that vary widely among the local speakers themselves. Overall, these features are strongly similar to both Californian as well as Canadian English. Studies are therefore inconclusive about whether this region constitutes a distinct dialect or not. One feature of many Pacific Northwest dialects is the pre-velar merger, where, before /g/, /ɛ/ and /æ/ are raised, and /eɪ/ is lowered, causing beg and vague to rhyme, and sometimes causing bag to sound similar to or rhyme with both of them. Younger speakers may also show signs of the aforementioned California Vowel Shift.

=== Utah ===
The English of Utah shows great variation, though little overall consistency, making it difficult to classify as either a sub-dialect of Western American English or a full dialect of its own. Members of the LDS Church may use the propredicate "do" or "done", as in the sentence "I would have done", unlike other Americans, suggesting a more recent British influence within the Church. Some speakers may realize the /ɹ/ as a flap [ɾ] after /θ/. One prominent older, declining feature of Utah English is the cord-card merger without a horse-hoarse merger, particularly along the Wasatch Front, which merges /ɑɹ/ (as in far) and /ɔɹ/ (as in for), while keeping /oʊɹ/ distinct (as in four). Utahns may use slightly distinct vowel placement and vowel space area during articulation, particularly with young, female speakers documented as pronouncing /æ/ as lower than /ɑ/, unlike other Western dialects. Throughout the Mormon corridor beyond Utah, practicing members of the Church of Jesus Christ of Latter-day Saints tend to lag behind regional dialect changes while maintaining characteristic Utah features.

== See also ==
- Hawaiʻi Creole English, popularly known as Pidgin
- American Indian English or Native American English
- Chinook Jargon, a local creole language once much more widely spoken
- Boontling, a local English-based cant spoken in Boonville, California
