= General American English =

Accents typical of English in the US

Speech example
An example of a White man from Pennsylvania (Bradley Cooper)

Speech example
An example of a Black woman from Georgia (Alice Walker)

Speech example
An example of an Asian woman from Illinois (Michelle Wu)

General American English, known in linguistics simply as General American (abbreviated GA or GenAm), is the umbrella accent of American English used by a majority of Americans, encompassing a continuum rather than a single unified accent. It is often perceived by Americans themselves as lacking any distinctly regional, ethnic, or socioeconomic characteristics, though Americans with high education, or from the (North) Midland, Western New England, and Western regions of the country are the most likely to be perceived as using General American speech.

The precise definition and usefulness of the term continue to be debated, and the scholars who use it today admittedly do so as a convenient basis for comparison rather than for exactness. Some scholars prefer other names, such as Standard American English, though this can be a wider term encompassing more than just accent, whereas General American does not incorporate other linguistic features like grammar structures, spelling conventions, vocabulary, etc.

Standard Canadian English accents may be considered to fall under General American, especially in opposition to the United Kingdom's Received Pronunciation. The phonetician John C. Wells, for instance, said in 1982 that typical Canadian English accents align with General American in nearly every situation where British and American accents differ.

== Consonants ==
A table containing the consonant phonemes is given below:

Consonant phonemes in General American
	Labial		Dental		Alveolar		Post- alveolar		Palatal	Velar		Glottal
Nasal		m				n					ŋ	
Stop	p	b			t	d				k	ɡ	
Affricate							tʃ	dʒ				
Fricative	f	v	θ	ð	s	z	ʃ	ʒ				h
Approximant						l		r	j	(ʍ)	w	

=== Pronunciation of L ===
England's typical distinction between a "clear L" (i.e. [l]) and a "dark L" (i.e. [ɫ]) is much less noticeable in nearly all dialects of American English; it is often altogether absent, with all "L" sounds tending to be "dark", meaning having some degree of velarization, perhaps even as dark as [ʟ] (though in the initial position, perhaps less dark than elsewhere among some speakers). The only notable exceptions to this "dark L" today are Southern American English and some Spanish-influenced American English varieties (such as East Coast Latino English) which can show a clear "L" in syllable onsets and intervocalically.

=== Pronunciation of R ===
The phoneme /r/ is pronounced as a postalveolar approximant [ɹ̠] or retroflex approximant [ɻ], but a unique "bunched tongue" variant of the sound is also associated with the United States, perhaps mostly in the Midwest and the South. All these variants exhibit various degrees of labialization and pharyngealization.

==== Rhoticity ====
Full rhoticity (or "R-fulness") is typical of American accents, in which /r/ is pronounced in all historical environments spelled with the letter ⟨r⟩. This includes in syllable-final position or before a consonant, such as in pearl, car and fort, whereas most speakers in England do not pronounce this ⟨r⟩ in these environments and so are called non-rhotic. Non-rhotic American accents, such as some accents of Eastern New England, New York City, and African-Americans, and a specific few (often older ones) spoken by Southerners, are often quickly noticed by General American listeners and perceived as sounding especially ethnic, regional, or antiquated.

Rhoticity is common in most American accents despite being now rare in England because, during the 17th-century British colonization of the Americas, nearly all dialects of English were rhotic, and most English in North America simply remained that way. The North American preservation of rhoticity was also supported by waves of rhotic-accented Scotch-Irish immigrants, most intensely during the 18th century, when this ethnic group eventually made up one-seventh of the colonial population, plus smaller waves during the following two centuries. Scotch-Irish settlers spread from Delaware and Pennsylvania throughout the larger Mid-Atlantic region, the inland regions of both the South and North, and throughout the West: American dialect areas that were all uninfluenced by upper-class non-rhoticity and that consequently have remained consistently rhotic. While non-rhoticity spread on the East Coast (perhaps first in imitation of early 19th-century London speech), even the East Coast has gradually begun to restore rhoticity, due to it becoming nationally prestigious since the mid-20th century.

=== T glottalization ===
/t/ is normally pronounced as a glottal stop [ʔ], both when after a vowel (or a liquid) and when before a syllabic [n̩] or any non-syllabic consonant, as in button [ˈbʌʔn̩] and fruitcake [ˈfɹuʔkʰeɪk]. Similarly, in absolute final position after a vowel or liquid, /t/ is replaced by, or simultaneously articulated with, glottal constriction: thus, what may be transcribed as [wʌʔ] and fruit as [fɹuʔ]. (This innovation of /t/ glottal stopping occurs in many British English dialects as well.)

=== T and D flapping ===
T-glottalization and flapping
mountain (glottalized t)
[ˈmaʊnʔn̩]

partner (glottalized t)
[ˈpʰɑɹʔnɚ]

leader (d-flapping)
[ˈɫiɾɚ]

cattle (t-flapping)
[ˈkʰæɾɫ̩]

party (t-flapping)
[ˈpʰɑɹɾi]

Optional flapping in certain contexts
relatively without flapping
[ˈɹɛɫɨtʰɪvɫi]

relatively with flapping
[ˈɹɛɫɨɾɪvɫi]

The consonants /t/ and /d/ become a flap [ɾ] both after a vowel or /r/ and before an unstressed vowel or a syllabic consonant other than [n̩]. Common example words include later [ˈɫeɪɾɚ], party [ˈpʰɑɹɾi] and model [ˈmɑɾɫ̩]. Flapping thus results in pairs of words such as ladder/latter, metal/medal, and coating/coding being pronounced the same. Flapping of /t/ or /d/ before a full stressed vowel is also possible but only if that vowel begins a new word or morpheme, as in what is it? [wʌɾˈɪzɨʔ] and twice in not at all [nɑɾəɾˈɔɫ]. Other rules apply to flapping, to such a complex degree in fact that flapping has been analyzed as being required in certain contexts, prohibited in others, and optional in still others. For instance, flapping is prohibited in words like seduce [səˈdus], retail [ˈɹitʰeɪɫ], and monotone [ˈmɑnɨtʰoʊn], yet optional in impotence [ˈɪmpɨɾɨns, ˈɪmpɨtʰɨns].

Both intervocalic /nt/ and /n/ may commonly be realized as [ɾ̃] (a nasalized alveolar flap) (flapping) or simply [n], making winter a homophone with winner in fast or informal speech.

=== Wine–whine merger ===
Word pairs like wine/whine, wet/whet, Wales/whales, wear/where, etc. are homophones, in most cases eliminating /ʍ/, also transcribed /hw/, the voiceless labiovelar fricative. However, scatterings of older speakers who do not merge these pairs still exist nationwide, perhaps most strongly in the South. This merger is also found in most modern varieties of British English.

=== Yod dropping after alveolar consonants ===
Dropping of the consonant /j/ (the sound of the y in yes or you) after another consonant, known as yod dropping in linguistics, is much more extensive in American accents than in most of England. In most North American accents, /j/ is "dropped" or "deleted" in stressed syllables after all alveolar and dental consonants (that is: everywhere except after /m/, /p/, /b/, /f/, /v/, /k/, /ɡ/, and /h/), so new, Tuesday, assume, duke are pronounced /nu/, /ˈtuzdeɪ/, /əˈsum/, /duk/ (compare with British /nju/, /ˈtjuzdeɪ/, /əˈsjum/, /djuk/. This applies also to syllables often transcribed with the secondary stress mark ⟨ˌ⟩ by American linguists, as in avenue /ˈævəˌnu/ (transcribed /ˈævənu/ in this article). In unstressed syllables (as in menu /ˈmɛnju/), however, /j/ is retained, as in most British accents.

== Vowels ==
Monophthongs of General American without the cot–caught merger, from Wells (1982, p. 486). [e] and [o] are monophthongal allophones of /eɪ/ and /oʊ/.

Diphthongs of General American, from Wells (1982, p. 486)

The 2006 Atlas of North American English surmises that "if one were to recognize a type of North American English to be called 'General American'" according to data measurements of vowel pronunciations, "it would be the configuration formed by these three" accent regions: (Standard) Canada, the American West, and the American Midland. The following charts present the vowels that converge across these three dialect regions to form an unmarked or generic American English sound system.

Vowel phonemes in General American
	Front		Central		Back	
	lax	tense	lax	tense	lax	tense
Close	ɪ	i			ʊ	u
Mid	ɛ	eɪ	ə		(ʌ)	oʊ
Open	æ			ɑ		(ɔ)
Historical diphthongs	aɪ ɔɪ aʊ					

=== Vowel length ===
Vowel length is not phonemic in General American, and therefore vowels such as /i/ are customarily transcribed without the length mark. Phonetically, the vowels of GA are short [ɪ, i, ʊ, u, eɪ, oʊ, ɛ, ʌ, ɔ, æ, ɑ, aɪ, ɔɪ, aʊ] when they precede the fortis consonants /p, t, k, tʃ, f, θ, s, ʃ/ within the same syllable and long [ɪː, iː, ʊː, uː, eːɪ, oːʊ, ɛː, ʌː, ɔː, æː, ɑː, aːɪ, ɔːɪ, aːʊ] elsewhere. (Listen to the minimal pair of kit and kid [ˈkʰɪt, ˈkʰɪːd].) All unstressed vowels are also shorter than the stressed ones, and the more unstressed syllables follow a stressed one, the shorter it is, so that /i/ in lead is noticeably longer than in leadership. (See Stress and vowel reduction in English.)

=== Vowel tenseness ===
/i, u, eɪ, oʊ, ɑ, ɔ/ are considered to compose a natural class of tense pure vowels (monophthongs) in General American. All of the tense vowels except /ɑ/ and /ɔ/ can have either monophthongal or diphthongal pronunciations (i.e. [i, u, e, ö̞] vs [ɪi, ʊu, eɪ, ö̞ʊ]). Diphthongs are the most usual realizations of /eɪ/ and /oʊ/ (as in stay [steɪ] and row [ɹö̞ʊ]), which is reflected in the way they are transcribed, though they are often perceptually regarded by speakers as monophthongs. Monophthongal realizations are still possible, most commonly in unstressed syllables; here are audio examples for potato [pʰəˈtʰeɪɾö̞] and window [ˈwɪndö̞]. In the case of /i/ and /u/, the monophthongal pronunciations ([i, u]) are in free variation with diphthongs ([ɪi~ɪ̈i, ʊu~ʊ̈ʉ]). As indicated in above phonetic transcriptions, /u/ is subject to the same variation (also when monophthongal: [u ~ ʉ]), but its mean phonetic value is usually somewhat less central than in modern Received Pronunciation (RP). /ɑ/ varies between back [ɑ] and central [ɑ̈].

==== Assigning of tense vowels to loanwords ====
The class of tense pure vowels manifests in how GA speakers treat recent loanwords, particularly borrowed in the last century or two, since in the majority of cases stressed syllables of foreign words are assigned one of these six vowels, regardless of whether the original pronunciation has a tense or a lax vowel. An example of this phenomenon is the Spanish word macho, Middle Eastern (for instance Turkish) word kebab, and German name Hans, which are all pronounced in GA with the tense /ɑ/, the PALM/LOT vowel, rather than lax /æ/, the TRAP vowel, as in Britain's Received Pronunciation (which approximates the original languages' pronunciation /a/ in using a lax vowel).

==== Pre-nasal TRAP tensing ====
For most speakers, the short a sound /æ/ as in TRAP or BATH, which is not normally a tense vowel, is pronounced with tensing—the tongue raised, followed by a centering glide—whenever occurring before a nasal consonant (that is, before /m/, /n/ and, for many speakers, /ŋ/). This sound may be broadly phonetically transcribed as [ɛə] (as in Anne and am), or, based on one's own unique accent or regional accent, variously as [eə] or [ɪə]. In the following audio clip, the first pronunciation is the tensed one for the word camp, much more common in American English than the second, which is more typical of British English. Linguists have variously called this "short a raising", "short a tensing", "pre-nasal /æ/ tensing", etc.

/æ/ raising in North American English
Following consonant	Example words	New York City, New Orleans	Baltimore, Philadelphia	Midland US, New England, Pittsburgh, Western US	Canada, Northern Mountain US	Minnesota, Wisconsin	Southern US	Great Lakes US
Non-prevocalic /m, n/	fan, lamb, stand	[ɛə] (Note: In New York City and Philadelphia, most function words (am, can, had, etc.) and some learned or less common words (alas, carafe, lad, etc.) have [æ].) (Note: In Philadelphia, the irregular verbs began, ran, and swam have [æ].)		[ɛə]	[ɛə]		[ɛə~ɛjə]	[ɛə]
Prevocalic /m, n/	animal, planet, Spanish	[æ]		[ɛə]	[ɛə]		[ɛə~ɛjə]	[ɛə]
/ŋ/	frank, language	[æ]		[ɛː~eɪ~æ]	[ɛː~ɛj]	[eː~ej]	[æ~æɛə]	[ɛə]
Prevocalic /ɡ/	dragon, magazine	[æ]		[æ] (Note: The untensed /æ/ may be lowered and retracted as much as [ä] in varieties affected by the Low-Back-Merger Shift, mainly predominant in Canada and the American West.)	[ɛː~ɛj]	[eː~ej]	[æ~æɛə]	[ɛə]
Non-prevocalic /ɡ/	bag, drag	[ɛə]	[æ] (Note: In Philadelphia, bad, mad, and glad alone in this context have [ɛə].)	[æ]	[ɛː~ɛj]	[eː~ej]	[æ~æɛə]	[ɛə]
Non-prevocalic /b, d, ʃ/	grab, flash, sad	[ɛə]	[æ]	[æ]	[æ]	[ɛə]	[æ~æɛə]	[ɛə]
Non-prevocalic /f, θ, s/	ask, bath, half, glass	[ɛə]		[æ]	[æ]	[ɛə]	[æ~æɛə]	[ɛə]
Otherwise	as, back, happy, locality	[æ] (Note: In New York City, certain lexical exceptions exist (like avenue being tense) and variability is common before /dʒ/ and /z/ as in imagine, magic, and jazz. In New Orleans, [ɛə] additionally occurs before /v/ and /z/.)		[æ]	[æ]	[ɛə]	[æ~æɛə]	[ɛə]

==== Tense vowels before L ====
Before dark l in a syllable coda, /i, u/ and sometimes also /eɪ, oʊ/ are realized as centering diphthongs [iə, uə, eə, oə]. Therefore, words such as peel /pil/ and fool /ful/ are often pronounced [pʰiəɫ] and [fuəɫ], whereas scale /skeɪl/ and goal /ɡoʊl/ may be pronounced [skeəɫ] and [ɡoəɫ].

=== PALM, LOT, CLOTH, and THOUGHT vowels ===
==== Unrounded LOT ====
The American phenomenon of the LOT vowel (often spelled ⟨o⟩ in words like box, don, clock, notch, pot, etc.) being produced without rounded lips, like the PALM vowel, allows the two vowels to unify as a single phoneme, usually transcribed /ɑ/ in IPA. A consequence is that some words, like father and bother, rhyme for most Americans. This father-bother merger is normal throughout the country, except in northeastern New England English (such as the Boston accent), the Pittsburgh accent, and variably in some older New York accents, which may retain a rounded articulation of bother, keeping it distinct from father.

==== LOT–THOUGHT merger in transition ====
The vowel in a word like LOT /ɑ/ versus the vowel in THOUGHT /ɔ/ are undergoing a merger, the cot–caught merger, in many parts of North America, but not in certain regions. American speakers with a completed merger pronounce the two historically separate vowels with the same sound (especially in the West, Great Plains region, northern New England, West Virginia and western Pennsylvania), but other speakers have no trace of a merger at all (especially middle-aged or older speakers in the South, the Great Lakes region, southern New England, and the Philadelphia–Baltimore and New York metropolitan areas) and so pronounce each vowel with distinct sounds. Among speakers who distinguish between the two, the vowel of cot is often a central [ɑ̈] or slightly advanced back [ɑ̟], while /ɔ/ is pronounced with more rounded lips and possibly phonetically higher in the mouth, close to [ɒ] or [ɔ]. Furthermore, there are dialectal differences regarding the amount of rounding of /ɔ/, with speakers from Baltimore, New York and Philadelphia having a more rounded vowel [ɔ̹] than other dialects. Among speakers who do not distinguish between them, thus producing a cot–caught merger, /ɑ/ usually remains a back vowel, [ɑ], sometimes showing lip rounding as [ɒ]. This is why it is sometimes called the low back merger. Therefore, even mainstream Americans vary greatly with this speech feature, with possibilities ranging from a full merger to no merger at all. In the West, for instance, PALM, LOT, CLOTH, and THOUGHT are all typically pronounced the same, falling under one phoneme. A transitional stage of the merger is also common in scatterings throughout the United States, most consistently in 1990s and early 2000s research in the American Midlands lying between the historical dialect regions of the North and the South. Meanwhile, younger Americans, in general, tend to be transitioning toward the merger. According to a 2003 dialect survey carried out across the country, about 61% of participants perceived themselves as keeping the two vowels distinct and 39% do not. A 2009 follow-up survey put the percentages at 58% non-merging speakers and 41% merging.

==== LOT–CLOTH split ====
American accents that have not undergone the cot–caught merger (the lexical sets LOT and THOUGHT) have instead retained a LOT–CLOTH split: a 17th-century distinction in which certain words (labeled as the CLOTH lexical set) separated away from the LOT set. The split, which has now reversed in most British English, simultaneously shifts this relatively recent CLOTH set into a merger with the THOUGHT (caught) set. Having taken place prior to the unrounding of the cot vowel, it results in lengthening and perhaps raising, merging the more recently separated vowel into the THOUGHT vowel in the following environments: before many instances of /f/, /θ/, and particularly /s/ (as in Austria, cloth, cost, loss, off, often, etc.), a few instances before /ŋ/ (as in strong, long, wrong), and variably by region or speaker in gone, on, and certain other words.

=== STRUT and COMMA vowels ===
The phonetic quality of /ʌ/ (STRUT) varies in General American. It is often an (advanced) open-mid back unrounded vowel [ʌ̟]:. Many Midland, Southern, African-American, and younger speakers nationwide pronounce it somewhat more centralized in the mouth.

Also, some scholars analyze [ʌ] to be an allophone of /ə/ (the unstressed vowel in words like COMMA, banana, oblige, etc.), that surfaces when stressed, so /ʌ/ and /ə/ may be considered to be in complementary distribution, comprising only one phoneme.

==== STRUT in special words ====
The STRUT vowel, rather than the one in LOT (as in Britain), is used in function words and certain other words like was, of, from, what, everybody, nobody, somebody, anybody, and, for many speakers because and sometimes even want, when stressed.

=== Pre-voiceless PRICE raising ===
Many speakers split the sound /aɪ/ based on whether it occurs before a voiceless consonant or not. Thus, in rider, it is pronounced [ä(ː)ɪ], but in writer, it is raised and potentially shortened to [ʌɪ] (because /t/ is a voiceless consonant while /d/ is not). Thus, words like bright, hike, price, wipe, etc. with a following voiceless consonant (such as /t, k, θ, s/) use a raised vowel sound compared to bride, high, prize, wide, etc. Because of this sound change, the words rider and writer, for instance, remain distinct from one another by virtue of their difference in height (and length) of the diphthong's starting point (unrelated to both the letters d and t being pronounced in these words as alveolar flaps [ɾ]). The sound change also applies across word boundaries, though the position of a word or phrase's stress may prevent the raising from taking place. For instance, a high school in the sense of "secondary school" is generally pronounced [ˈhɐɪskuɫ]; however, a high school in the literal sense of "a tall school" would be pronounced [ˌhaɪˈskuɫ]. The sound change began in the Northern, New England, and Mid-Atlantic regions of the country, and is becoming more common across the nation.

Many speakers outside of General American areas in the Inland North, Upper Midwestern, and Philadelphia dialect areas raise /aɪ/ before voiced consonants in certain words as well, particularly [d], [g] and [n]. Hence, words like tiny, spider, cider, tiger, dinosaur, beside, idle (but sometimes not idol), and fire may contain a raised nucleus. The use of [ʌɪ], rather than [aɪ], in such words is unpredictable from the phonetic environment alone, but it may have to do with their acoustic similarity to other words with [ʌɪ] before a voiceless consonant, per the traditional Canadian-raising system. Some researchers have argued that there has been a phonemic split in those dialects, and the distribution of the two sounds is becoming more unpredictable among younger speakers.

=== KIT variation in final unstressed /ɪŋ/ ===
General American speakers typically realize final unstressed /ɪŋ/, like at the end of singing, as [ɪŋ] or, in a particularly casual style, [ɪn ~ ɨn]. However, many speakers from California, other Western states including those in the Pacific Northwest, and the Upper Midwest realize final unstressed /ɪŋ/ as [in] when /ɪ/ ("short i") is raised to become [i] ("long ee") before the underlying /ŋ/ is converted to [n], so that coding, for example, is pronounced [ˈkoʊɾin], homophonous with codeine.

=== Weak vowel merger ===
The KIT vowel /ɪ/ in unstressed syllables generally merges with the COMMA vowel /ə/, so that the noun effect is pronounced like verb affect, and abbot and rabbit rhyme. The quality of the merged vowel varies considerably based on the environment but is typically more open, like [ə], in word-final or open-syllable word-initial positions (making salon [səˈɫɑn], cilantro [səˈɫɑntɹoʊ] and comma [ˈkʰɑmə]), but more close and often more fronted, like [ɪ~ɨ], in other positions (making rabbit [ˈɹæbɨt] and minus [ˈmaɪnɨs]). (Despite phonetic variation within the latter vowel, the symbol ⟨ɨ⟩ is used consistently on this page.) The word-final allophone [ə] is typically retained before inflectional suffixes, potentially creating minimal pairs such as Rosa's [ˈɹoʊzəz] vs. roses [ˈɹoʊzɨz]. (Note: Though analyses may differ, the choice to use the symbol ⟨ɨ⟩ here dates back to a tradition starting in the 1950s from linguist George L. Trager and others.)

=== Vowels before R ===
==== R-colored vowels ====
The lexical sets NURSE and lettER are merged as the sequence /ər/, a schwa vowel plus /r/, which can also be analyzed as a simple syllabic /r/, though often phonetically transcribed as the R-colored schwa [ɚ]. Therefore, perturb, pronounced /pəˈtɜːb/ in British Received Pronunciation (RP), is /pərˈtərb/ (phonetically [pɚˈtɚb]) in General American pronunciation. Similarly, the words forward and foreword, which are phonologically distinguished in RP as /ˈfɔːwəd/ and /ˈfɔːwɜːd/, are homophonous in GA: /ˈfɔrwərd/ (or phonetically [ˈfɔɹwɚd]). As General American is a rhotic accent (therefore lacking the commA–lettER merger), some minimal pairs that are distinguished by length in RP are still distinguished in GA by the absence of an /r/; compare the place name Downton /ˈdaʊntən/ and the common noun downturn /ˈdaʊntərn/ (RP /ˈdaʊntən/ vs. /ˈdaʊntɜːn/, with no trace of /r/). Thus, the merger affects only some minimal pairs found in RP. Moreover, what is historically /ʌr/, as in hurry, merges to /ər/ in GA as well, so the historical phonemes /ʌ/, /ɜ/, and /ə/ are all neutralized before /r/. Thus, unlike in most English dialects of England, /ɜ/ is not a true phoneme in General American but merely a different notation of /ə/ for when this phoneme precedes /r/ and is stressed—a convention preserved in many sources to facilitate comparisons with other accents.

==== Vowel mergers before R ====
Most North American accents are characterized by the mergers of certain vowels when they occur before intervocalic /r/. The only exceptions exist primarily along the East Coast.

- Mary–marry–merry merger in transition: According to the 2003 dialect survey, nearly 57% of participants from around the country self-identified as merging the sounds /ær/ (as in the first syllable of parish), /ɛr/ (as in the first syllable of perish), and /ɛər/ (as in pear or pair). The merger is largely complete in most regions of the country, the major exceptions being much of the Atlantic Coast and southern Louisiana.
- Hurry–furry merger: The pre-/r/ vowels in words like hurry /ʌ/ and furry /ɜ/ are merged in most American accents to [ɚ] or a syllabic consonant [ɹ̩]. Roughly only 10% of American English speakers acknowledge the distinct hurry vowel before /r/, according to the same dialect survey aforementioned.
- Mirror–nearer merger in transition: The pre-/r/ vowels in words like mirror /ɪ/ and nearer /i/ are merged or very similar in most American accents. The quality of the historic mirror vowel in the word miracle is quite variable.
- Americans vary slightly in their pronunciations of R-colored vowels such as those in /ɛər/ and /ɪər/, which are sometimes monophthongized towards [ɛɹ] and [ɪɹ] or tensed towards [eɪɹ] and [i(ə)ɹ] respectively. That causes pronunciations like [pʰeɪɹ] for pair/pear and [pʰiəɹ] for peer/pier. Also, /jʊər/ is often reduced to [jɚ], so that cure, pure, and mature may all end with the sound [ɚ], thus rhyming with blur and sir. The word sure is also part of the rhyming set as it is commonly pronounced [ʃɚ].
- Horse–hoarse merger: This merger makes the vowels /ɔ/ and /o/ before /r/ homophones, with homophonous pairs like horse/hoarse, corps/core, for/four, morning/mourning, war/wore, etc. homophones. Many older varieties of American English still keep the sets of words distinct, particularly in the extreme Northeast, the South (especially along the Gulf Coast), and the central Midlands, but the merger is evidently spreading and younger Americans rarely show the distinction. This merger is also found in most modern varieties of British English.
- "Short o" before r before a vowel: In typical North American accents (both U.S. and Canada), the historical sequence /ɒr/ (a short o sound followed by r and then another vowel, as in orange, forest, moral, and warrant) is realized as [oɹ~ɔɹ], thus further merging with the already-merged /ɔr/–/oʊr/ (horse–hoarse) set. In the U.S., a small number of words (namely, tomorrow, sorry, sorrow, borrow, and morrow) usually contain the sound [ɑɹ] instead and thus merge with the /ɑr/ set (thus, sorry and sari become homophones, both rhyming with starry).

General American /ɑr/ and /ɔr/ followed by a vowel, compared with other dialects
	British RP	General American	Traditional American (Note: This here refers to accents of greater New York City, greater Philadelphia, the older Southern U.S., and the older Northeastern elite. It also includes some speakers, though particularly older ones, in Eastern New England (predominantly Rhode Island) and coastal states of the modern Southern U.S.)	Canada
Only borrow, sorrow, sorry, (to)morrow	/ɒr/	/ɑːr/	/ɒr/ or /ɑːr/	/ɔːr/
Forest, Florida, historic, moral, porridge, etc.	/ɒr/	/ɔːr/	/ɒr/ or /ɑːr/	/ɔːr/
Forum, memorial, oral, storage, story, etc.	/ɔːr/	/ɔːr/	/ɔːr/	/ɔːr/

=== Lists of monophthongs, diphthongs, and R-colored vowels ===
Historical pure vowels (monophthongs)
Wikipedia's IPA diaphoneme	Wells's GenAm phoneme	GenAm realization	Example words
/æ/		[æ]	bath, trap, yak
/æ/		[eə~ɛə]	ban, tram, sand (pre-nasal /æ/ tensing)
/ɑː/	/ɑ/	[ɑ~ɑ̈]	ah, father, spa
/ɒ/	/ɑ/	[ɑ~ɑ̈]	bother, lot, wasp (father–bother merger)
/ɒ/	/ɔ/	[ɑ~ɒ~ɔ̞]	boss, cloth, dog, off (lot–cloth split)
/ɔː/	/ɔ/	[ɑ~ɒ~ɔ̞]	all, bought, flaunt (cot–caught variability)
/oʊ/	/o/	[oʊ~ɔʊ~ʌʊ~o̞]	goat, home, toe
/ɛ/		[ɛ]	dress, met, bread
/eɪ/		[e̞ɪ~eɪ]	lake, paid, feint
/ʌ/		[ʌ̟~ʌ]	bus, flood, what
/ə/		[ə~ɐ~ʌ]	about, oblige, arena
/ə/		[ɨ~ɪ~ə]	ballad, focus, harmony (weak vowel merger)
/ɪ/		[ɪ~ɪ̞]	kit, pink, tip
/iː/	/i/	[i]	beam, chic, fleece
/iː/	/i/	[i]	happy, money, parties (happY tensing)
/ʊ/		[ʊ̞]	book, put, should
/uː/	/u/	[u̟~ʊu~ʉu~ɵu]	goose, new, true

Historical diphthongs
Wikipedia's IPA diaphoneme	GenAm realization	Example words
/aɪ/	[äːɪ]	bride, prize, tie
/aɪ/	[äɪ~ɐɪ~ʌ̈ɪ]	bright, price, tyke (price raising)
/aʊ/	[aʊ~æʊ]	now, ouch, scout
/ɔɪ/	[ɔɪ~oɪ]	boy, choice, moist

R-colored vowels
Wikipedia's IPA diaphoneme	GenAm realization	Example words
/ɑːr/	[ɑɹ]	barn, car, park
/ɛər/	[ɛəɹ]	bare, bear, there
/ɛər/	[ɛ(ə)ɹ]	bearing
/ɜːr/	[ɚ]	burn, first, murder
/ər/	[ɚ]	murder
/ɪər/	[iəɹ~ɪəɹ]	fear, peer, tier
/ɪər/	[i(ə)ɹ~ɪ(ə)ɹ]	fearing, peering
/ɔːr/	[ɔəɹ~oəɹ]	horse, storm, war
/ɔːr/	[ɔəɹ~oəɹ]	hoarse, store, wore
/ʊər/	[ʊəɹ~oəɹ~ɔəɹ]	moor, poor, tour
/ʊər/	[ʊ(ə)ɹ~o(ə)ɹ~ɔ(ə)ɹ]	poorer

== Terminology ==
=== History and modern definition ===
The term "General American" was first disseminated by American English scholar George Philip Krapp, who in 1925 described it as an American type of speech that was "Western" but "not local in character". In 1930, American linguist John Samuel Kenyon, who largely popularized the term, considered it equivalent to the speech of "the North" or "Northern American", but, in 1934, "Western and Midwestern". Now typically regarded as falling under the General American umbrella are the regional accents of the West, Western New England, and the North Midland (a band spanning central Ohio, central Indiana, central Illinois, northern Missouri, southern Iowa, and southeastern Nebraska), plus the accents of highly educated Americans nationwide. Arguably, all Canadian English accents west of Quebec are also General American, though Canadian vowel raising and certain other features may serve to distinguish such accents from U.S. ones. William Labov et al.'s 2006 Atlas of North American English presented a scattergram based on the formants of vowel sounds, finding the Midland U.S., the Western U.S., Western Pennsylvania, and Central and Western Canada to be closest to the center of the scattergram, and concluding that they had fewer marked dialectical features than other regional accents of North American English, such as New York City or the Southern U.S.

The Mid-Atlantic United States, the Inland Northern United States, and Western Pennsylvania were regarded as having General American accents in the earlier twentieth century but not by the middle of that century. Many younger speakers within the Mid-Atlantic region, the Inland North, and many other areas, however, appear to be retreating from their regional features towards a more General American accent. The regional accents (especially the r-dropping ones) of Eastern New England, New York City, and the Southern United States have never been labeled "General American", even since the term's popularization in the 1930s. In 1982, British phonetician John C. Wells wrote that two-thirds of the American population spoke with a General American accent.

=== Disputed usage ===
English-language scholar William A. Kretzschmar Jr. explains in a 2004 article that the term "General American" came to refer to "a presumed most common or 'default' form of American English, especially to be distinguished from marked regional speech of New England or the South" and referring especially to speech associated with the vaguely defined "Midwest", despite any historical or present evidence supporting this notion. Kretzschmar argues that a General American accent is simply the result of American speakers suppressing regional and social features that have become widely noticed and stigmatized.

Since calling one variety of American speech the "general" variety can imply privileging and prejudice, Kretzchmar instead promotes the term Standard American English, which he defines as a level of American English pronunciation "employed by educated speakers in formal settings", while still being variable within the U.S. from place to place, and even from speaker to speaker. However, the term "standard" may also be interpreted as problematically implying a superior or "best" form of speech. The terms Standard North American English and General North American English, in an effort to incorporate Canadian speakers under the accent continuum, have also been suggested by sociolinguist Charles Boberg. Since the 2000s, Mainstream American English has also been occasionally used, particularly in scholarly articles that contrast it with African-American English.

Modern language scholars discredit the original notion of General American as a single unified accent, or a standardized form of English—except perhaps as used by television networks and other mass media. Today, the term is understood to refer to a continuum of American speech, with some slight internal variation, but otherwise characterized by the absence of "marked" pronunciation features: those perceived by Americans as strongly indicative of a fellow American speaker's regional origin, ethnicity, or socioeconomic status. Despite confusion arising from the evolving definition and vagueness of the term "General American" and its consequent rejection by some linguists, the term persists mainly as a reference point to compare a baseline "typical" American English accent with other Englishes around the world (for instance, see Comparison of General American and Received Pronunciation).

== Origins ==
=== Regional origins ===
Though General American accents are not commonly perceived as associated with any region, their sound system does have traceable regional origins: specifically, the English of the non-coastal Northeastern United States in the very early 20th century, which was relatively stable since that region's original settlement by English speakers in the mid-19th century. This includes western New England and the area to its immediate west, settled by members of the same dialect community: interior Pennsylvania, Upstate New York, and the adjacent "Midwest" or Great Lakes region. However, since the early to mid-20th century, deviance away from General American sounds started occurring, and may be ongoing, in the eastern Great Lakes region due to its Northern Cities Vowel Shift (NCVS) towards a unique Inland Northern accent (often now associated with the region's urban centers, like Chicago and Detroit) and in the western Great Lakes region towards a unique North Central accent (often associated with Minnesota, Wisconsin, and North Dakota).

=== Theories about prevalence ===
Linguists have proposed multiple factors contributing to the popularity of a rhotic "General American" class of accents throughout the United States, largely focused on the first half of the twentieth century. However, a basic General American pronunciation system existed even before the twentieth century, since most American English dialects have diverged very little from each other anyway, when compared to dialects of single languages in other countries where there has been more time for language change (such as the English dialects of England or German dialects of Germany).

One factor fueling General American's popularity was the major demographic change of twentieth-century American society: increased suburbanization, leading to less mingling of different social classes and less density and diversity of linguistic interactions. As a result, wealthier and higher-educated Americans' communications became more restricted to their own demographic. This, alongside their new marketplace that transcended regional boundaries (arising from the century's faster transportation methods), reinforced a widespread belief that highly educated Americans should not possess a regional accent. A General American sound, then, originated from both suburbanization and suppression of regional accent by highly educated Americans in formal settings. A second factor was a rise in immigration to the Great Lakes area (one native region of supposed "General American" speech) following the region's rapid industrialization period after the American Civil War, when this region's speakers went on to form a successful and highly mobile business elite, who traveled around the country in the mid-twentieth century, spreading the high status of their accents. A third factor is that various sociological (often race- and class-based) forces repelled socially-conscious Americans away from accents negatively associated with certain minority groups, such as African Americans and poor white communities in the South and with Southern and Eastern European immigrant groups (for example, Jewish communities) in the coastal Northeast. Instead, socially-conscious Americans settled upon accents more prestigiously associated with White Anglo-Saxon Protestant communities in the remainder of the country: namely, the West, the Midwest, and the non-coastal Northeast.

Kenyon, author of American Pronunciation (1924) and pronunciation editor for the second edition of Webster's New International Dictionary (1934), was influential in codifying General American pronunciation standards in writing. He used as a basis his native Midwestern (specifically, northern Ohio) pronunciation. Kenyon's home state of Ohio, however, far from being an area of "non-regional" accents, has emerged now as a crossroads for at least four distinct regional accents, according to late twentieth-century research. Furthermore, Kenyon himself was vocally opposed to the notion of any superior variety of American speech.

== In the media ==
General American, like the British Received Pronunciation (RP) and prestige accents of many other societies, has never been the accent of the entire nation, and, unlike RP, does not constitute a homogeneous national standard. Starting in the 1930s, nationwide radio networks adopted non-coastal Northern U.S. rhotic pronunciations for their "General American" standard. The entertainment industry similarly shifted from a non-rhotic standard to a rhotic one in the late 1940s, after the triumph of the Second World War, with the patriotic incentive for a more wide-ranging and unpretentious "heartland variety" in television and radio. Newscaster Walter Cronkite exemplified the rise of General American in broadcasting during the mid-20th century.

General American is thus sometimes associated with the speech of North American radio and television announcers, promoted as prestigious in their industry, where it is sometimes called "Broadcast English", "Network English", or "Network Standard". Instructional classes in the United States that promise "accent reduction", "accent modification", or "accent neutralization" usually attempt to teach General American patterns. Television journalist Linda Ellerbee states that "in television you are not supposed to sound like you're from anywhere", and political comedian Stephen Colbert says he consciously avoided developing a Southern American accent in response to media portrayals of Southerners as stupid and uneducated.

== See also ==
- List of dialects of the English language
- List of English words from indigenous languages of the Americas
- Accent reduction
- African-American English
- American English
- California English
- Chicano English
- English phonology
- English-language spelling reform
- Hawaiian Pidgin
- Northern Cities Vowel Shift
- Received Pronunciation
- Regional vocabularies of American English
- Standard Written English
- Transatlantic accent
