= Sunbreak =

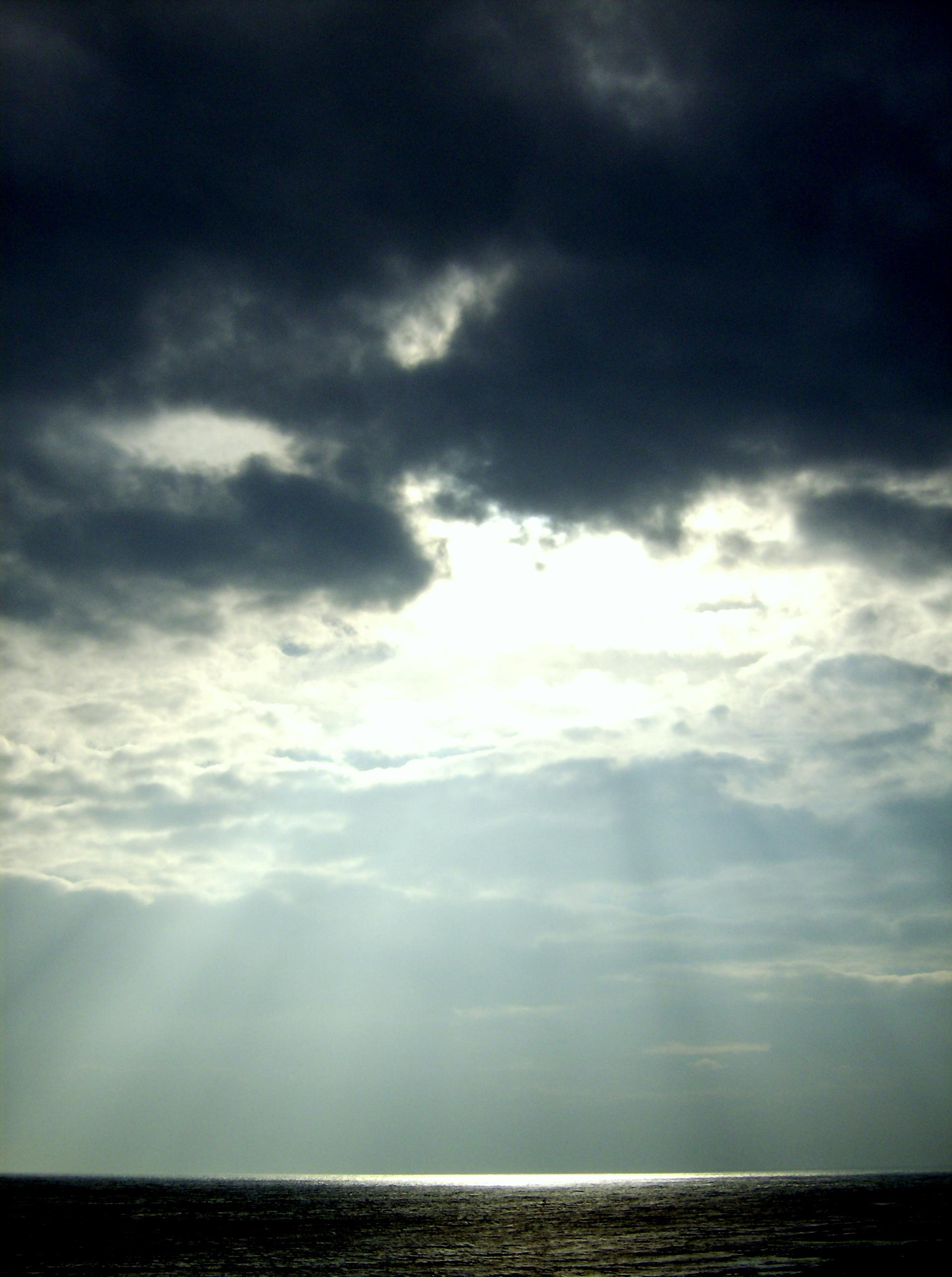
The sunlight shining through these clouds in England is an example of sunbreak.

A sunbreak is a natural phenomenon in which sunlight obscured over a relatively large area penetrates the obscuring material in a localized space. The typical example is of sunlight shining through a hole in cloud cover. A sunbreak piercing clouds normally produces a visible shaft of light reflected by atmospheric dust and or moisture, called a sunbeam. Another form of sunbreak occurs when sunlight passes into an area otherwise shadowed by surrounding large buildings through a gap temporarily aligned with the position of the sun.

The word is considered by some to have origins in Pacific Northwest English.

== In art ==
Artists such as cartoonists and filmmakers often use sunbreak to show protection or relief being brought upon an area of land by God or a receding storm.
