= Southern English =

Southern English may refer to:

- English language in Southern England, the English language of southern England
- Southern American English, the English language of the South of the United States

== See also ==
- Northern English (disambiguation)
