= Mid-Atlantic accent =

Mid-Atlantic accent or Transatlantic accent may refer to:

- Northeastern elite accent, any of various similar accents of English used by the Northeastern elite of the United States born between the 19th century and early 20th century, sharing features with upper-class British accents
- Good American Speech, a consciously learned American accent, partly influenced by the above and mostly associated with early 20th-century actors and announcers

Mid-Atlantic accent may also refer to:

- Philadelphia English, the dialect spoken in the lower Mid-Atlantic region (the Delaware Valley and Baltimore regions, specifically) of the United States
