= California English =

Dialect of English spoken in California

- Region: United States (California)
- Language family: Indo-European: Germanic; West Germanic; Ingvaeonic; Anglo–Frisian; Anglic; English; North American English; American English; Western American English; California English
- Early forms: Old English: Middle English; Early Modern English

Language codes
- ISO 639-3: –
- Glottolog: None
- IETF: en-u-sd-usca

California English (or Californian English) is the collection of English dialects native to California, traditionally classified under General or Western American English.

== History and overview ==
As California became more diverse, English speakers from a wide variety of backgrounds began to pick up different linguistic elements from one another and also developed new ones; the result is both divergence and convergence within California English. Overall, linguists who studied English around World War II tended to find few, if any, patterns unique to the state. Studies in the 1950s and 1960s largely only commented on the increasingly common cot–caught merger within the state.

In the 1980s, linguists first noted a distinctive chain shift of vowel sounds, the California Vowel Shift, used by young people in southern California and the San Francisco Bay Area of northern California. This helped to define an accent emerging primarily among youthful, white, urban, coastal speakers, and popularly associated with the valley girl and surfer youth subcultures. The possibility that this is, in fact, an age-specific variety of English is one hypothesis; however, certain features of this accent are intensifying and spreading geographically.

Other documented California English includes a "country" accent associated with rural and inland white Californians, which is also (to a lesser extent) affected by the California Vowel Shift; an older accent once spoken by Irish Americans in San Francisco; and distinctly Californian varieties of Chicano English mainly associated with Mexican Americans. Research has shown that Californians themselves perceive a linguistic boundary between northern and southern California, particularly regarding the northern use of hella, and southern (but now nationally widespread) use of dude, bro, and like.

== Urban coastal California English ==
Varieties of English most popularly associated with California largely correlate with the major urban areas along the coast. Notable is the absence of a distinct /ɔ/ phoneme (the vowel sound of caught, stalk, clawed, etc.), which has completely merged with /ɑ/ (the vowel sound of cot, stock, clod, etc.), as in most of the Western United States.

Vowels of California English
	Front		Central				Back
	Front		unrounded		rounded		Back
	lax	tense	lax	tense	lax	tense	tense
Close		i				u	
Close-mid	ɪ	eɪ	ə, ʌ		ʊ	oʊ	
Open	ɛ		æ				ɑ
Diphthongs	aɪ ɔɪ aʊ						

A few phonological processes have been identified as being particular to urban and coastal California English. However, these vowel changes are by no means universal in Californian speech, and any single Californian's speech may only have some or none of the changes identified below. These sounds might also be found in the speech of some people from areas outside of California.

Front vowels are raised before /ŋ/, so that the traditional "short a" /æ/ and "short i" /ɪ/ sounds are raised to the "long a" [eɪ~e] and "long ee" [i] sounds, respectively, when before the ng sound /ŋ/. In other contexts, /ɪ/ (as in bit, rich, quick, etc.) has a fairly open pronunciation, as indicated in the vowel chart here. Similarly, a word like rang /ɹæŋ/ will often have the same vowel as rain /ɹeɪn/ in California English, /ɹeɪŋ/, rather than the same vowel as ran /ɹæn/ (phonetically articulated as [ɹɛən~ɹeən]; see below). In addition, /ɪŋ/ may be pronounced with a raised vowel [iŋ], or even [in] in a nonfinite verb ending, so that thinking is pronounced /ˈθiŋkin/ ('theenkeen'), rather than /ˈθɪŋkən/ or /ˈθɪŋkɪŋ/ and king is pronounced more like /kiŋ/ ('keeng'), whereas bullying features two consecutive FLEECE vowels: /ˈbʊli.iŋ/ bull-ee-eeng or /ˈbʊli.in/ bull-ee-een (cf. GenAm /ˈbʊli.ɪŋ/, with FLEECE followed by KIT). As all vowels preceding /ŋ/ are historically short, this does not lead to a loss of phonemic contrast.

Before /n/ or /m/ (as in ran or ram), /æ/ is raised and diphthongized to [ɛə] or [eə] (a widespread shift throughout most of American English). Elsewhere, /æ/ is lowered and backed as a result of the California vowel shift (see below).

Uptalk, meaning a high-rising intonation in certain declarative sentences, is on the rise, for example in Southern Californian English. One 2014 study found uptalk used equally by Southern Californian men and women in 16% of declarative statements. However, women were twice as likely to use uptalk in order to hold the floor (a linguistic strategy similar to a filler or discourse marker).

In Northern California generally, a tense [eɪ~e] is the pronunciation of /ɛ/ before /g/ in words such as egg, beg, leg, which can thus be pronounced as /eɪg/ ayg, /beɪg/ bayg, /leɪg/ layg, respectively.

=== California vowel shift ===
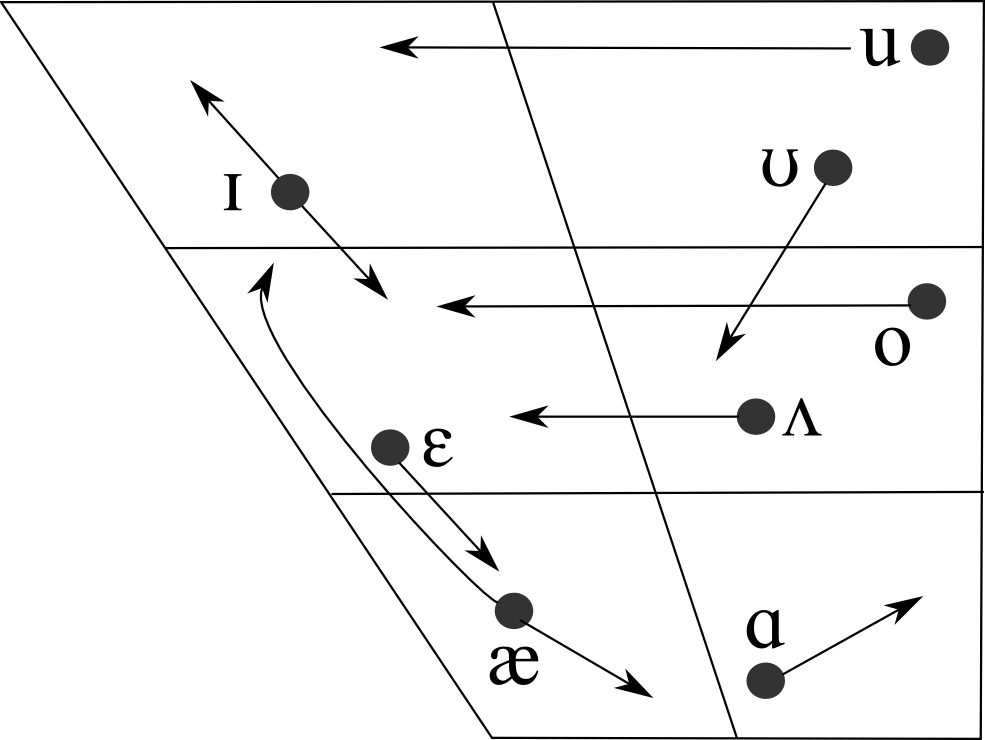
The California vowel shift in Northern California. The phoneme transcribed with ⟨o⟩ is represented in this article as ⟨oʊ⟩.

One topic that has begun to receive much attention from scholars in recent decades has been the emergence of a vowel-based chain shift in California (with a similar pattern now reported nationwide and known as the low-back-merger shift). The image in this section illustrates the California vowel shift in Northern California on a vowel chart. The vowel space of the image is a cross-section (as if looking at the interior of a mouth from a side profile perspective); it is a rough approximation of the space in a human mouth where the tongue is located in articulating certain vowel sounds (the left is the front of the mouth closer to the teeth, the right side of the chart being the back of the mouth). As with other vowel shifts, several vowels may be seen moving in a chain shift around the mouth. As one vowel encroaches upon the space of another, the adjacent vowel in turn experiences a movement in order to maximize phonemic differentiation.

For convenience, California English will be compared with a "typical" General American English, abbreviated "GA". /ɪ/ is pulled towards [ɛ] (bit and miss are sounding more like how other dialects realize bet and mess), /ɛ/ is pulled towards [æ] (wreck and kettle are sounding more like rack and cattle), /æ/ is pulled towards [ä], and /ɑ/ and /ɔ/ merge (cot and stock are sounding more like caught and stalk): the cot-caught merger.

Other vowel changes, whose relation with the shift is uncertain, are also emerging: except before /l/, /u/ is moving through [ʉ] towards [y] (rude and true are almost approaching reed and tree, but with rounded lips), and /oʊ/ is moving beyond [əʊ]. /ʊ/ is moving towards [ʌ] (so that, for example, book and could in the California dialect start to sound, to a GA speaker, more like buck and cud), /ʌ/ is moving through [ɜ], sometimes approaching [ɛ] (duck, crust, what, etc. are sounding like how U.S. Southerners pronounce them, or like how other Americans might pronounce deck, crest, wet, etc.).

New vowel characteristics of the California shift are increasingly found among younger speakers. For example, while some characteristics such as the close central rounded vowel [ʉ] or close front rounded vowel [y] for /u/ are widespread in Californian speech, the same high degree of fronting for /oʊ/ is found predominantly among young speakers.

The effects of the California vowel shift have been noted in varieties of Californian Spanish, particularly in the Bay Area.

== Rural inland California English ==
One dialect of English, mostly reported in California's rural interior, inland from the major coastal cities, has been popularly described as a "country", "hillbilly", or "twang" variety. This California English variety is reminiscent of and presumably related to Southern or South Midland U.S. accents, mostly correlated with white, outdoors-oriented speakers of the Central Valley. It has been studied even as far north as Trinity County but could possibly extend farther, and as far south as Kern County (metropolitan Bakersfield), possibly extending as far south as eastern San Diego County. Similar to the nonstandard accents of the South Midland and Southern United States, speakers of such towns as Redding and Merced have been found to use the word anymore in a positive sense and the verb was in place of the standard English plural verb were. Related other features of note include the pin–pen merger, fill–feel merger, and full–fool merger.

The Great Depression's westward Dust Bowl migrations of settlers into California from the Southern United States, namely from Oklahoma, Texas, Missouri, and Arkansas, is the presumable cause of this rural white accent's presence in California's Central Valley. Rural northern California was also settled by Oklahomans and Arkansans, though perhaps more recently in the 1970s and 1980s, due to the region's timber industry boom. However, even in a single town, any given individual's identification with working and playing outdoors versus indoors appears to be a greater determiner of this accent than the authenticity of the individual's Southern heritage. For example, this correlates with less educated rural men of northern California documented as raising /ɛ/ in a style similar to the Southern drawl. Overall, among those who orient toward a more town lifestyle, features of the California Vowel Shift are more prominent, but not to the same extent as in urban coastal communities such as San Jose. By contrast, among those who orient toward a more country lifestyle, the Southern features are more prominent, but some aspects of the California Vowel Shift remain present as well.

== Mission brogue (San Francisco) ==
The Mission brogue is a disappearing accent spoken within San Francisco, mostly during the 20th century in the Mission District. It sounds distinctly like New York and possibly Boston accents, due to a large number of Irish Americans migrating from those two East Coast cities to the Mission District in the late 19th century. It is today spoken only by some of the oldest Irish American and possibly Jewish residents of the city. From before the 1870s to the 1890s, Irish Americans were the largest share of migrants coming to San Francisco, the majority arriving by way of Northeastern U.S. cities like New York and Boston, thus bringing those cities' ways of speaking with them. In San Francisco, the Mission District quickly became a predominantly Irish Catholic neighborhood, and its local dialect became associated with all of San Francisco as a way to contrast it with the rest of California. Sounding like a "real San Franciscan" therefore once meant sounding "like a New Yorker", the speakers said to "talk like Brooklynites". Other names included the "south of the Slot" (referring to the cable car track running down Market Street) or "south of Market" accent.

Pronunciation features of this accent included:

- Th-stopping
- No cot–caught merger, with /ɔː/ being raised and accompanied with an inglide, so as to produce a vowel sound approximating [oə]
- Non-rhoticity
  - The use of [əɪ] for /ɜːr/ before unvoiced consonants such that NURSE would have almost the same vowel sound as "choice"
- Glottal stop, [ʔ], instead of /t/ before syllabic /əl/ such as in "bottle"; this and all the above features were reminiscent of a New York accent
- Possible TRAP–BATH split, reminiscent of older Boston English

Overall, starting in the latter half of the 20th century, San Francisco has been undergoing dialect levelling towards the broader regional Western American English, for example: younger Mission District speakers now exhibit a full cot–caught merger, show the vowel shift of urban coastal Californians, and front the GOOSE and GOAT vowels.

== Other varieties ==
Certain varieties of Chicano English are also native to California, sometimes even being spoken by non-Latino Californians. One example is East Los Angeles Chicano English, which has been influenced by both Californian and African American Vernacular English.

The coastal urban accent of California traces many of its features back to Valleyspeak: a social dialect arising in the 1980s among a particular white youthful demographic in the San Fernando Valley, including Los Angeles.

Boontling is a jargon or argot spoken in Boonville, California, with only about 100 speakers today.

== Lexical overview ==
The popular image of a typical southern California speaker often conjures up images of the so-called Valley girls popularized by the 1982 hit song by Frank and Moon Zappa, or "surfer-dude" speech made famous by movies such as Fast Times at Ridgemont High. While many phrases found in these extreme versions of California English from the 1980s may now be considered passé, certain words such as awesome, totally, for sure, harsh (verb), gnarly, and dude have remained popular in California and have spread to a national, even international, level.

A common example of a northern Californian colloquialism is hella (from "(a) hell of a (lot of)", and the euphemistic alternative hecka) to mean "many", "much", "so" or "very". It can be used with both count and mass nouns. For example: "I haven't seen you in hella long"; "There were hella people there"; or "This guacamole is hella good". The word can be casually used multiple times in multiple ways within a single sentence. Pop culture references to "hella" are common, as in the song "Hella Good" by the band No Doubt, which hails from southern California, and "Hella" by the band Skull Stomp, who come from northern California.

California, like other Southwestern states, has borrowed many words from Spanish, especially for place names, food, and other cultural items, reflecting the linguistic heritage of the Californios as well as more recent immigration from Mexico and elsewhere in Latin America. High concentrations of various ethnic groups throughout the state have contributed to general familiarity with words describing (especially cultural) phenomena. For example, a high concentration of Asian Americans from various cultural backgrounds, especially in urban and suburban metropolitan areas in California, has led to the adoption of the word hapa (itself originally a Hawaiian borrowing of English "half") to mean someone of mixed European/Islander or Asian/Islander heritage.

In 1958, essayist Clifton Fadiman pointed out that northern California is the only place (besides England and the area surrounding Ontario and the Canadian Prairies) where the word chesterfield is used as a synonym for sofa or couch.

=== Freeways ===
In Southern California, freeways are often referred to either by name or by route number but with the addition of the definite article "the", such as "the 405 North", "the 99" or "the 605 (Freeway)". This usage has been parodied in the recurring Saturday Night Live sketch "The Californians". In contrast, typical Northern California usage omits the definite article. When Southern California freeways were built in the 1940s and early 1950s, local common usage was primarily the freeway name preceded by the definite article, such as "the Hollywood Freeway". It took several decades for Southern California locals to start to commonly refer to the freeways with the numerical designations, but usage of the definite article persisted. For example, it evolved to "the 605 Freeway" and then shortened to "the 605".

Signage along U.S. Route 101 reflects the different lexicon usage between Southern and Northern California.

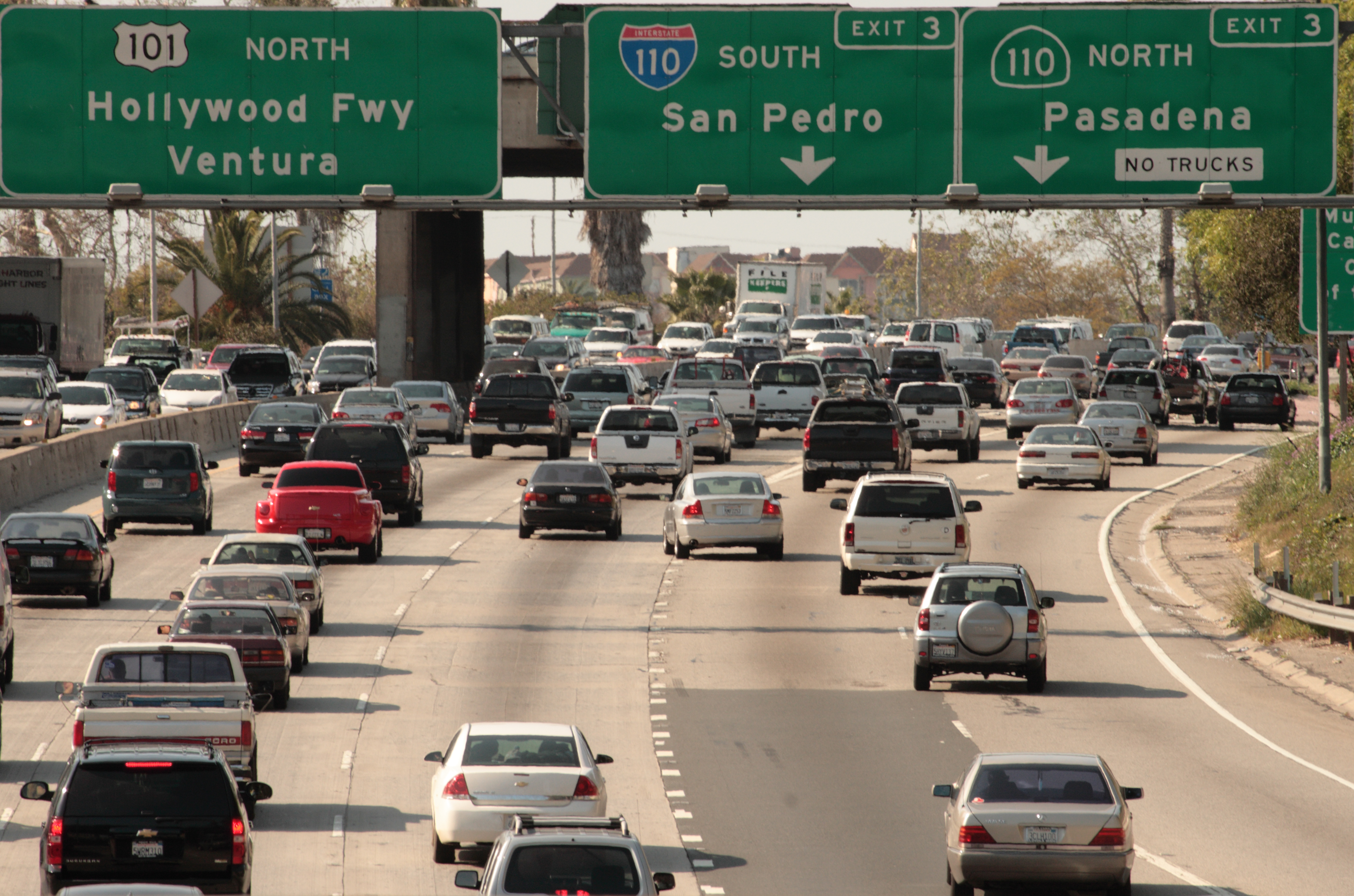
Signage at the 110 Freeway interchange in Los Angeles, with the leftmost sign for the 101 freeway north listing both its name, the Hollywood Freeway, as well as its destination, Ventura

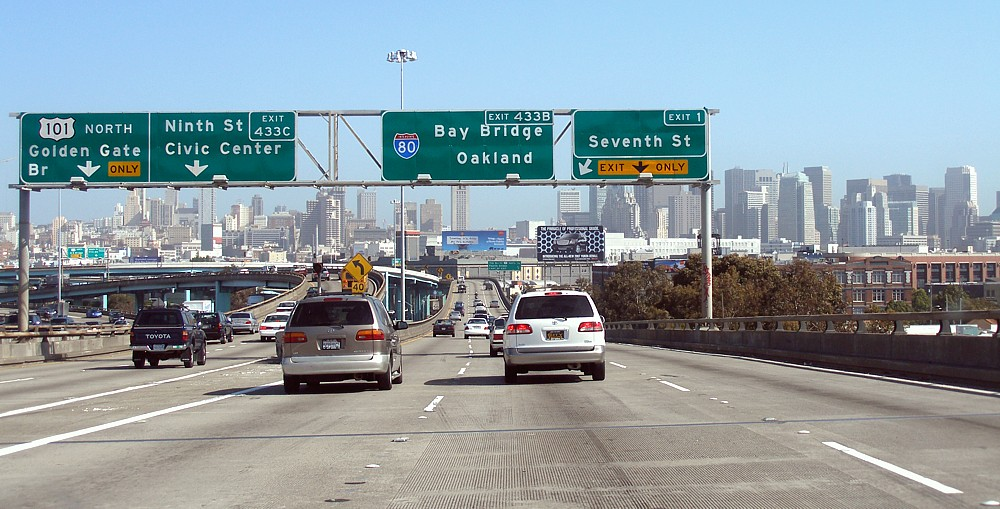
Signage at the I-80 interchange in San Francisco, with the leftmost sign for US101 north listing only its destination, the Golden Gate Bridge

== See also ==
- Hyphy
- North American English regional phonology
- Spanglish
- Valspeak
- Languages of California
  - Spanish language in California – Second-most spoken language in California
  - Chicano English – Dialect of English spoken in the Southwestern United States
  - Caló – Argot of Spanish spoken in the Southwestern United States
  - Indigenous languages of California – Native languages spoken in California
