= Chicano English =

Dialect of English spoken in the Southwestern United States

- Mexican-American English
- Native to: United States
- Region: Southwestern United States
- Ethnicity: Latino Americans, Hispanic Americans
- Language family: Indo-European: Germanic; West Germanic; North Sea Germanic; Anglo–Frisian; Anglic; English; North American English; American English; Chicano English
- Writing system: Latin (English alphabet); American Braille

Language codes
- ISO 639-3: –

Chicano English, or Mexican-American English, is a dialect of American English spoken primarily by Mexican Americans (sometimes known as Chicanos), particularly in the Southwestern United States ranging from Texas to California, as well as in Chicago. Chicano English is sometimes mistakenly conflated with Spanglish, which is a mixing of Spanish and English; however, Chicano English is a fully formed and native dialect of English, not a "learner English" or interlanguage. It is even the native dialect of some speakers who know little to no Spanish, or have no Mexican heritage.

== Naming issues ==
Many people who speak Chicano English do not themselves identify with the term "Chicano." For example, none of Brumbaugh (2017)'s eight Hispanic participants identified with the term. Despite this, Chicano English remains the most widely used and recognized term for this language variety. Some studies on Chicano English have used terms such as "Mexican-American English", "Latino English", and "Mexican Heritage English".

== History ==
Communities of Spanish-speaking Tejanos, Nuevomexicanos, Californios, and Mission Indians have existed in the American Southwest since the area was part of New Spain's Provincias Internas. Most of the historically Hispanophone populations eventually adopted English as their first language, as part of their overall Americanization.

A high level of Mexican immigration began in the 20th century, with the exodus of refugees from the Mexican Revolution (1910) and the linkage of Mexican railroads to the US (Santa Ana, 1991). The Hispanic population is one of the largest and fastest-growing ethnic groups in the United States. In the Los Angeles metropolitan area alone, they form 45% of the population (roughly 6 million out of 13.3 million in 2014). The result of the migration and the segregated social conditions of the immigrants in California made an ethnic community that is only partly assimilated to the matrix Anglo (European American) community. It retains symbolic links with Hispanic culture (as well as real links from continuing immigration), but linguistically, it is mostly an English-speaking, not a Spanish-speaking, community. However, its members have a distinctive accent.

The phonological inventory of Chicano English speakers appears to be identical to that of the local Anglo community. For example, long and short vowels are clearly distinguished, as is the English vowel /æ/. Speculatively, it seems that the main differences between the Chicano accent and the local Anglo accent are that the Chicanos are not always participating in ongoing phonetic changes in Anglo communities, such as the raising of /æ/ that characterizes Anglo Inland Northern speakers but not necessarily Hispanic ones.

Because Spanish-speaking people migrated from other parts of the Hispanophone world to the Southwest, Chicano English is now the customary dialect of many Hispanic Americans of diverse national heritages in the Southwest. As Hispanics are of diverse racial origins, Chicano English serves as the distinction from non-Hispanic and non-Latino Americans in the Southwest.

A common stereotype about Chicano English speakers, similar to stereotypes about other racial/ethnic minorities in the United States, is that Chicano English speakers are not proficient in English and are generally uneducated. This language ideology is linked to negative perceptions about Chicano Americans and Hispanics in general.

== Phonology ==
=== Prosody ===
The rhythm of Chicano English tends to have an intermediate prosody between a Spanish-like syllable timing, with syllables taking up roughly the same amount of time with roughly the same amount of stress, and General American English's stress timing, with only stressed syllables being evenly timed.

Chicano English also has a complex set of nonstandard English intonation patterns, such as pitch rises on significant words in the middle and at the end of sentences as well as initial-sentence high pitches, which are often accompanied by the lengthening of the affected syllables. When needing extra emphasis to certain words, there is the use of rising glides. Rising glides can be used multiple times in one sentence. On compound nouns and verbs, major stress is on the second word. Rising glides can occur at any time and at either monosyllabic or polysyllabic words.

=== Consonants ===
Certain Chicano English consonant pronunciations are similar to African-American Vernacular English.

- Chicano English often exhibits th-stopping. That is, /ð/ sounds may be replaced with /d/ sounds, as in "dese" and "dem" instead of "these" and "them".
- t/d deletion occurs at the end of a word when those consonants are part of a consonant cluster. For example, "missed" becomes "miss".

Certain consonants show Spanish-language influence:

- Chicano speakers may realize /v/ bilabially, as a stop [b] or a fricative/approximant [β], with very being pronounced [ˈbɛɹi] or [ˈβɛɹi].
- /l/ is never velarized and so it is pronounced similarly to Spanish /l/, which also lacks velarization, in all positions.
- /z/ can undergo devoicing in all environments: [ˈisi] for easy and [wʌs] for was.

=== Vowels ===
Mexican-Americans show variable participation in local sound shifts, like the Northern Cities Shift of the Great Lakes or the California Shift in the American West.

Reduction of unstressed vowels is less common in Chicano English than in Anglo varieties.

While a lack of pre-nasal /æ/ raising is often characteristic of Chicano English, in El Paso, /æ/ raising is found among both Anglos and Hispanics.

The cot–caught merger is complete, approximately to [ɑ̈]. For younger speakers, however, the vowel is retracted to [ɑ] by the Californian Vowel Shift.

The salary–celery merger occurs, with /æ/ and /ɛ/ merging before /l/. This is found in Los Angeles, northern New Mexico and Albuquerque, and in El Paso.

/ɪŋ/ is pronounced as [in], making showing sound like show-een. This feature has since spread to other varieties of California English.

The distinction between /ɪ/ and /i/ before liquid consonants is often reduced in some Chicano accents, making fill and feel homophones. That is also a feature of general California English.

/u/ is slightly fronted, as in most American and many British dialects, but less fronted than in mainstream California English.

Some realizations of /i/, /eɪ/, /oʊ/, and other long vowels are monophthongal. That may be an effect of Spanish, but other American English dialects (Minnesota, for example) also can show monophthongization of such vowels, which are more commonly diphthongs in English. Also, such vowels are underlyingly long monophthongs so the general effect thus is to simplify the system of phonetic implementation, compared to the /ɪi, eɪ, oʊ, ʊu/ of many other English dialects.

== Variation ==
A fair to strong degree of variation exists in the phonology of Chicano English. Its precise boundaries are difficult to delineate, perhaps because of its separate origins of the dialect in the Southwest and the Midwest.

One subvariety, referenced as Tejano English, is used mainly in southern Texas. California subvarieties are also widely studied, especially that of the Los Angeles metropolitan area, such as East Los Angeles Chicano English, which includes elements of African American Vernacular English and California English.

=== New Mexico ===
One type of Hispanic English, a sub-type under Chicano English of the American West, is specific to north-central New Mexico. A recent study found that native English–Spanish bilinguals in New Mexico have a lower/shorter/weaker voice-onset time than that typical of native monolingual English speakers. Northern New Mexico Hispanic English, transcending age, ethnicity, or socioeconomic status, has been reported as having its own vowel shift as follows: /i/ is [ɪ] before a final /l/ (so feel merges to the sound of fill), /u/ is [ʊ] before any consonant (so suit merges to the sound of soot), /ɛ/ is [æ] before a final /l/ (so shell merges to the sound of shall), and /ʌ/ is [ɑ̈] before any consonant (so cup merges to the sound of something like cop). However, a later study examining the speech of college students in Albuquerque failed to find evidence of /u/ being laxed to [ʊ] or of /ʌ/ becoming lowered to [ɑ̈].

=== East Los Angeles ===
This form of Chicano English is predominantly spoken in East Los Angeles and has been influenced by the California English of coastal European-Americans and African-American Vernacular English.

== See also ==
- Caló (Chicano)
- New York Latino English
- Spanish language in California

== Sources ==
- Bayley, Robert; Santa Ana, Otto (2004). "Chicano English: morphology and syntax". In Kortmann, Bernd; Schneider, Edgar W.; Burridge, Kate; Mesthrie, Rajend; Upton, Clive (eds.). A handbook of varieties of English. Vol. 2: Morphology and Syntax. Berlin: Mouton de Gruyter. pp. 374–390. doi:10.1515/9783110197181-100. ISBN 3-11-017532-0.
- Briggs, Charles L. Competence in Performance: The Creativity of Tradition in Mexicano Verbal Art. University of Pennsylvania Press conduct and communication series. Philadelphia: University of Pennsylvania Press, (1988).
- Brumbaugh, Susan (2017). Anglo and Hispanic Vowel Variation in New Mexican English (PhD). University of New Mexico.
- Castaneda, L. V. and Ulanoff, S. H. (2007). Examining Chicano English at school. In C. Gitsaki (Ed.). Language and Languages: Global and Local Tensions, (pp. 328–345). Newcastle, UK: Cambridge Scholars Publishing.
- Fought, Carmen. (2003). Chicano English in context. New York: Palgrave Macmillan.
- Galindo, Letticia D. (1987). Linguistic influence and variation of the English of Chicano adolescents in Austin, Texas. (PhD dissertation, University of Texas at Austin).
- Liu, Jennifer Anchor dissects American English Stanford Daily, February 23, 2005
- Maddieson, Ian, and Manuel Godinez Jr. "Vowel differences between Chicano and General Californian English." International Journal of the Sociology of Language 1985, no. 53 (May 1985): 43-58. Communication & Mass Media Complete, EBSCOhost (accessed October 15, 2015).
- Ornstein-Galicia, J. (1988). Form and Function in Chicano English. Rowley, Mass.: Newbury House Publishers.
- Penfield, Joyce. Chicano English: An Ethnic Contact Dialect. Varieties of English around the world, General series; v. 7. Amsterdam; Philadelphia: J. Benjamins Pub. Co., (1985).
- Sanchez, Rosaura. Chicano Discourse: Sociohistoric Perspectives. Rowley, Mass.: Newbury House Publishers, (1983).
- Santa Ana, Otto. (1993). Chicano English and the Chicano language setting. Hispanic Journal of Behavioral Sciences, 15 (1), 1-35.
- Santa Ana, Otto; Bayley, Robert (2004). "Chicano English: phonology". In Kortmann, Bernd; Schneider, Edgar W.; Burridge, Kate; Mesthrie, Rajend; Upton, Clive (eds.). A handbook of varieties of English. Vol. 1: Phonology. Berlin: Mouton de Gruyter. pp. 417–434. doi:10.1515/9783110197181-030. ISBN 3-11-017532-0.
- Veatch, Thomas Los Angeles Chicano English (2005)
- Wolfram, Walt. (1974). Sociolinguistic aspects of assimilation: Puerto Rican English in New York City. Washington, D.C.: Center for Applied Linguistics.
- A Handbook of Varieties of English
- Guerrero, Armando. “'You Speak Good English for Being Mexican' East Los Angeles Chicano/a English: Language & Identity.” Voices, 4 June 2014, escholarship.org/uc/item/94v4c08k.
- Santa Ana, Otto. “Chicano English and the Nature of the Chicano Language Setting.” Hispanic Journal of Behavioral Sciences, 1 Feb. 1993, journals.sagepub.com/doi/abs/10.1177/07399863930151001.
