= Phonological history of English close front vowels =

The close and mid-height front vowels of English (vowels of i and e type) have undergone a variety of changes over time and often vary by dialect.

== Developments involving long vowels ==
=== Merger of /y/ with /i/ and /yː/ with /iː/ ===
Old English had the two vowel pairs /y/–/yː/ (spelled with ⟨y⟩) and /i/–/iː/ (spelled with ⟨i⟩). By Middle English, the distinction in quality collapsed, leaving only the short–long pair /i/–/iː/, which became KIT /ɪ/ and PRICE /aɪ/ in Modern English. Changes in spelling mean that ⟨y⟩ and ⟨i⟩ are not good indicators of the Old English distinction between the four sounds. For example, Modern English bridge derives from Old English bryċġ, while Modern English scythe derives from Old English sīþe. The name of the letter ⟨y⟩ acquired an initial [w] sound in it to keep it distinct from the name of the letter ⟨i⟩.

=== Until the Great Vowel Shift ===
Middle English had a long close front vowel /iː/, and two long mid front vowels: the close-mid /eː/ and the open-mid /ɛː/. The three vowels generally correspond to the modern spellings ⟨i⟩, ⟨ee⟩ and ⟨ea⟩ respectively, but other spellings are also possible. The spellings that became established in Early Modern English are mostly still used today, but the qualities of the sounds have changed significantly.

The /iː/ and /eː/ generally corresponded to similar Old English vowels, and /ɛː/ came from Old English /æː/ or /æːɑ̯/. For other possible histories, see English historical vowel correspondences. In particular, the long vowels sometimes arose from short vowels by Middle English open syllable lengthening or other processes. For example, team comes from an originally-long Old English vowel, and eat comes from an originally short vowel that underwent lengthening. The distinction between both groups of words is still preserved in a few dialects, as is noted in the following section.

Middle English /ɛː/ was shortened in certain words. Both long and short forms of such words often existed alongside each other during Middle English. In Modern English, the short form has generally become standard, but the spelling ⟨ea⟩ reflects the formerly longer pronunciation. The words that were affected include several ending in d, such as bread, head, spread, and various others, including breath, weather, and threat. For example, bread was /brɛːd/ in earlier Middle English but came to be shortened and to be rhymed with bed.

During the Great Vowel Shift, the normal outcome of /iː/ was a diphthong, which developed into Modern English /aɪ/, as in mine and find. Meanwhile, /eː/ became /iː/, as in feed, and /ɛː/ of words like meat became /eː/, which later merged with /iː/ in nearly all dialects, as is described in the following section.

=== Meet–meat merger ===
The meet–meat merger or the FLEECE merger is the merger of the Early Modern English vowel /eː/ (as in meat) into the vowel /iː/ (as in meet). The merger was complete in standard accents of English by about 1700.

As noted in the previous section, the Early Modern/New English (ENE) vowel /eː/ developed from Middle English /ɛː/ via the Great Vowel Shift, and ENE /iː/ was usually the result of Middle English /eː/ (the effect in both cases was a raising of the vowel). The merger saw ENE /eː/ raised further to become identical to /iː/ and so Middle English /ɛː/ and /eː/ have become /iː/ in standard Modern English, and meat and meet are now homophones. The merger did not affect the words in which /ɛː/ had undergone shortening (see section above), and a handful of other words (such as break, steak, great) also escaped the merger in the standard accents and so acquired the same vowel as brake, stake, grate. Hence, the words meat, threat (which was shortened), and great now have three different vowels although all three words once rhymed.

The merger results in the FLEECE lexical set, as defined by John Wells. Words in the set that had ENE /iː/ (Middle English /eː/) are mostly spelled ⟨ee⟩ (meet, see, green, etc.), with a single ⟨e⟩ in monosyllables (be, me) or followed by a single consonant and a vowel letter (these, Peter), sometimes ⟨ie⟩ or ⟨ei⟩ (believe, ceiling), or irregularly (key, people). Most of those that had ENE /eː/ (Middle English /ɛː/) are spelled ⟨ea⟩ (meat, sea, team, eat, etc.), but some borrowed words have a single ⟨e⟩ (legal, decent, complete), ⟨ei⟩, or otherwise (receive, seize, phoenix, quay). There are also some loanwords in which /iː/ is spelled ⟨i⟩ (police, machine, ski), most of which entered the language later.

There are still some dialects in the British Isles that do not have the merger. Some speakers in Northern England have /iː/ or /əɪ/ in the first group of words (those that had ENE /iː/, like meet) but /ɪə/ in the second group (those that had ENE /eː/, like meat). In Staffordshire, the distinction might rather be between /ɛi/ in the first group and /iː/ in the second group. In some (particularly rural) varieties of Irish English, the first group has /i/, and the second preserves /eː/. A similar contrast has been reported in parts of Southern and Western England, but it is now rarely encountered there.

In some Yorkshire dialects, an additional distinction may be preserved within the meat set. Words that originally had long vowels, such as team and cream (which come from Old English tēam and Old French creme), may have /ɪə/, and those that had an original short vowel, which underwent open syllable lengthening in Middle English (see previous section), like eat and meat (from Old English etan and mete), have a sound resembling /ɛɪ/, similar to the sound that is heard in some dialects in words like eight and weight that lost a velar fricative.

In Alexander's book (2001) about the traditional Sheffield dialect, the spelling "eigh" is used for the vowel of eat and meat, but "eea" is used for the vowel of team and cream. However, a 1999 survey in Sheffield found the /ɛɪ/ pronunciation to be almost extinct there.

=== Changes before /r/ and /ə/ ===
In certain accents, when the FLEECE vowel was followed by /r/, it acquired a laxer pronunciation. In General American, words like near and beer now have the sequence /ir/, and nearer rhymes with mirror (the mirror–nearer merger). In Received Pronunciation, a diphthong /ɪə/ has developed (and by non-rhoticity, the /r/ is generally lost unless there is another vowel after it) and so beer and near are /bɪə/ and /nɪə/, and nearer (with /ɪə/) remains distinct from mirror (with /ɪ/). Several pronunciations are found in other accents, but outside North America, the nearer–mirror opposition is always preserved. For example, some conservative accents in Northern England have the sequence /iːə/ in words like near, with the schwa disappearing before a pronounced /r/, as in serious.

Another development is that bisyllabic /iːə/ may become smoothed to the diphthong [ɪə] (with the change being phonemic in non-rhotic dialects, so /ɪə/) in certain words, which leads to pronunciations like [ˈvɪəkəl], [ˈθɪətə] and [aɪˈdɪə] for vehicle, theatre/theater and idea, respectively. That is not restricted to any variety of English. It happens in both British English and (less noticeably or often) American English as well as other varieties although it is far more common for Britons. The words that have [ɪə] may vary depending on dialect. Dialects that have the smoothing usually also have the diphthong [ɪə] in words like beer, deer, and fear, and the smoothing causes idea, Korea, etc. to rhyme with those words.

=== Other changes ===
In Geordie, the FLEECE vowel undergoes an allophonic split, with the monophthong [iː] being used in morphologically-closed syllables (as in freeze [fɹiːz]) and the diphthong [ei] being used in morphologically-open syllables not only word-finally (as in free [fɹei]) but also word-internally at the end of a morpheme (as in frees [fɹeiz]).

Most dialects of English turn /iː/ into a diphthong, and the monophthongal [iː] is in free variation with the diphthongal [ɪi ~ əi] (with the former diphthong being the same as Geordie [ei], the only difference lying in the transcription), particularly word-internally. However, diphthongs are more common word-finally.

Compare the identical development of the close back GOOSE vowel.

== Developments involving short vowels ==
=== Lowering ===
Middle English short /i/ has developed into a lax near-close near-front unrounded vowel, /ɪ/, in Modern English, as found in words like kit. (Similarly, short /u/ has become /ʊ/.) According to Roger Lass, the laxing occurred in the 17th century, but other linguists have suggested that it took place potentially much earlier.

The short mid vowels have also undergone lowering and so the continuation of Middle English /e/ (as in words like dress) now has a quality closer to [ɛ] in most accents. Again, however, it is not clear whether the vowel already had a lower value in Middle English.

=== Pin–pen merger ===
The merger of pin and pen in Southern American English. In the purple areas, the merger is complete for most speakers. Note the exclusion of the New Orleans area, Southern Florida, and of the Lowcountry of South Carolina and Georgia. The purple area in California consists of the Bakersfield and Kern County area, where migrants from the south-central states settled during the Dust Bowl. There is also debate whether or not Austin, Texas, is an exclusion. Based on Labov, Ash & Boberg (2006:68).

The pin–pen merger is a conditional merger of /ɪ/ and /ɛ/ before the nasal consonants [m], [n], and [ŋ]. The merged vowel is usually closer to [ɪ] than to [ɛ]. Examples of homophones resulting from the merger include pin–pen, kin–ken and him–hem. The merger is widespread in Southern American English and is also found in many speakers in the Midland region immediately north of the South and in areas settled by migrants from Oklahoma and Texas who settled in the Western United States during the Dust Bowl. It is also a characteristic of much African-American Vernacular English.

The pin–pen merger is one of the most widely recognized features of Southern speech. A study of the written responses of American Civil War veterans from Tennessee, together with data from the Linguistic Atlas of the Gulf States and the Linguistic Atlas of the Middle South Atlantic States, shows that the prevalence of the merger was very low up to 1860 but then rose steeply to 90% in the mid-20th century. There is now very little variation throughout the South in general except that Savannah, Miami, and New Orleans are excluded from the merger. The area of consistent merger includes southern Virginia and most of the South Midland and extends westward to include much of Texas. The northern limit of the merged area shows a number of irregular curves. Central and southern Indiana is dominated by the merger, but there is very little evidence of it in Ohio, and northern Kentucky shows a solid area of distinction around Louisville.

Outside the South, most speakers of North American English maintain a clear distinction in perception and production. However, in the West, there is sporadic representation of merged speakers in Washington, Idaho, Kansas, Nebraska, and Colorado. However, the most striking concentration of merged speakers in the west is around Bakersfield, California, a pattern that may reflect the trajectory of migrant workers from the Ozarks westward.

The raising of /ɛ/ to /ɪ/ was formerly widespread in Irish English and was not limited to positions before nasals. Apparently, it came to be restricted to those positions in the late 19th and the early 20th centuries. The pin–pen merger is now commonly found only in Southern and South-West Irish English.

A complete merger of /ɪ/ and /ɛ/, not restricted to positions before nasals (and so termed kit–dress merger), is found in many speakers of Newfoundland English. The pronunciation in words like bit and bet is [ɪ], but before /r/, in words like beer and bear, it is [ɛ]. The merger is common in Irish-settled parts of Newfoundland and is thought to be a relic of the former Irish pronunciation.

Examples of homophonous pairs
/ɛ/	/ɪ/	IPA	Notes
Ben	bin	ˈbɪn	
bend	binned	ˈbɪnd	
cents	since	ˈsɪn(t)s	
clench	clinch	ˈklɪntʃ	
den	din	ˈdɪn	
emigrate	immigrate	ˈɪmɪɡreɪt	
eminent	imminent	ˈɪmɪnənt	
fen	fin	ˈfɪn	
gem	gym, Jim	ˈdʒɪm	
hem	him, hymn	ˈhɪm	
Jen	gin	ˈdʒɪn	
Ken	kin	ˈkɪn	
lent	lint	ˈlɪnt	
meant	mint	ˈmɪnt	
N	in	ˈɪn	
pen	pin	ˈpɪn	
send	sinned	ˈsɪnd	
sender	cinder	ˈsɪndə(r)	
sense	since	ˈsɪns	
ten	tin	ˈtɪn	
tender	tinder	ˈtɪndə(r)	
tent	tint	ˈtɪnt	
tremor	trimmer	ˈtrɪmə(r)	
wench	winch	ˈwɪntʃ	
Wendy	windy	ˈwɪndi	

=== Kit–bit split ===
The kit–bit split is a split of standard English /ɪ/ (the KIT vowel) that occurs in South African English. The two distinct sounds are:

- A standard [ɪ], or [i] in broader accents, which is used before or after a velar consonant (lick, big, sing; kiss, kit, gift), after /h/ (hit), word-initially (inn), generally before /ʃ/ (fish), and by some speakers before /tʃ, dʒ/ (ditch, bridge). It is found only in stressed syllables (in the first syllable of chicken but not the second).
- A centralized vowel [ɪ̈], or [ə] in broader accents, which is used in other positions (limb, dinner, limited, bit).

Different phonemic analyses of those vowels are possible. In one view, [ɪ] and [ɪ̈] are in complementary distribution and should therefore still be regarded as allophones of one phoneme. Wells, however, suggests that the non-rhyming of words like kit and bit, which is particularly marked in the broader accents, makes it more satisfactory to consider [ɪ̈] to constitute a different phoneme from [ɪ ~ i], and [ɪ̈] and [ə] can be regarded as comprising a single phoneme except for speakers who maintain the contrast in weak syllables. There is also the issue of the weak vowel merger in most non-conservative speakers, which means that rabbit /ˈræbət/ (conservative /ˈræbɪt/) rhymes with abbott /ˈæbət/. The weak vowel is consistently written ⟨ə⟩ in South African English dialectology, regardless of its precise quality.

=== Thank–think merger ===
The thank–think merger is the lowering of /ɪ/ to /æ/ before the velar nasal /ŋ/ that can be found in the speech of speakers of African American Vernacular English, Appalachian English, and (rarely) Southern American English. For speakers with the lowering, think and thank, sing and sang, etc. can sound alike. It is reflected in the colloquial variant spelling thang of thing. Note that there are very few English words with the sequence ɛŋ, which may help explain how such a dramatic shift could take place.

== Developments involving weak vowels ==
=== Weak vowel merger ===
The weak vowel merger is the loss of contrast between /ə/ (schwa) and unstressed /ɪ/, which occurs in certain dialects of English: notably many Southern Hemisphere, North American, Irish, and 21st-century (but not older) standard Southern British accents. In speakers with this merger, the words abbot and rabbit rhyme, and Lennon and Lenin are pronounced identically, as are addition and edition. However, it is possible among these merged speakers (such as General American) that a distinction is still maintained in certain contexts, such as in the pronunciation of Rosa's versus roses, because of the morpheme break in Rosa's. (Speakers without the merger generally have [ɪ] in the final syllables of rabbit, Lenin, roses and the first syllable of edition that is distinct from the schwa [ə] heard in the corresponding syllables of abbot, Lennon, Rosa's and addition.) If an accent with the merger is also non-rhotic, then for example chatted and chattered will be homophones, as will arches and archers. The merger also affects the weak forms of some words and causes unstressed it, for instance, to be pronounced with a schwa, so that dig it would rhyme with bigot.

The merger is very common in Southern Hemisphere accents. Most speakers of Australian English (as well as recent Southern England English) replace weak /ɪ/ with schwa, but in -ing, the pronunciation is frequently [ɪ]. If there is a following /k/, as in paddock or nomadic, some speakers maintain the contrast, but some who have the merger use [ɪ] as the merged vowel. In New Zealand English, the merger is complete, and indeed, /ɪ/ is very centralized even in stressed syllables and so it is usually regarded as the same phoneme as /ə/ although in -ing, it is closer to [i]. In South African English, most speakers have the merger, but in more conservative accents, the contrast may be retained (as [ɪ̈] vs. [ə]. Also, a kit split exists: see above.

The merger is also commonly found in American and Canadian English, but the realisation of the merged vowel varies according to syllable type, with [ə] appearing in word-final or open-syllable word-initial positions (such as drama or cilantro), but [ɪ~ɨ] often appearing in other positions (abbot and exhaust). In traditional Southern American English, the merger is generally not present, and /ɪ/ is also heard in some words that have schwa in RP, such as salad. The lack of the merger is also a traditional feature of New England English. In Caribbean English, schwa is often not used at all, and unreduced vowels are preferred, but if there is a schwa, /ɪ/ remains distinct from it.

In traditional RP, the contrast between /ə/ and weak /ɪ/ is maintained, but that may be declining among modern standard speakers of southern England, who increasingly prefer a merger, specifically with the realisation [ə]. In RP, the phone [ɨ̞], apart from being a frequent allophone of /ʊ/ (as in foot [fɨ̞ʔt]) in younger speakers, appears only as an allophone of /ɪ/, which is often centralized when it occurs as a weak vowel, and never as an allophone of /ə/. Therefore, [ˈlɛnɨ̞n] can stand for only "Lenin", not "Lennon", which has a lower vowel: [ˈlɛnən]. However, speakers may not always clearly perceive that difference, as /ə/ is sometimes raised to [ɘ] in contact with alveolar consonants (such as the alveolar nasals in "Lennon" [ˈlɛnɘn]). Furthermore, [ɨ̞] never participates in syllabic consonant formation and so G-dropping in words such as fishing never yields a syllabic nasal *[ˈfɪʃn̩] or a sounded mid schwa *[ˈfɪʃən], with the most casual RP forms being [ˈfɪʃɪn, -ɨ̞n]. Both [ˈfɪʃən] and especially [ˈfɪʃn̩] were considered to be strongly non-standard in England as late as 1982. They are characteristic of Cockney, which otherwise does not feature the weak vowel merger, but /ɪ/ can be centralized to [ɨ̞] as in RP and so [ˈfɪʃɪn] and [ˈfɪʃɨ̞n] are distinct possibilities in Cockney. In other accents of the British Isles, the contrast between /ə/ and weak /ɪ/ may be variable. In Irish English, the merger is almost universal.

The merger is not complete in Scottish English, whose speakers typically distinguish except from accept, but the latter can be phonemicized with an unstressed STRUT: /ʌkˈsɛpt/ (as can the word-final schwa in comma /ˈkɔmʌ/) and the former with /ə/: /əkˈsɛpt/. In other environments, KIT and COMMA are mostly merged to a quality around [ə], often even when stressed (Wells transcribes the merged vowel with ⟨ɪ⟩. There, ⟨ə⟩ is used for the sake of consistency and accuracy) and when before /r/, as in fir /fər/ and letter /ˈlɛtər/ (but not fern /fɛrn/ and fur /fʌr/: see nurse mergers). The HAPPY vowel is /e/: /ˈhape/.

Even in accents that do not have the merger, there may be certain words in which traditional /ɪ/ is replaced by /ə/ by many speakers (both sounds may then be considered to be in free variation). In RP, /ə/ is now often heard in place of /ɪ/ in endings such as -ace (as in palace); -ate (as in senate); -less, -let, for the ⟨i⟩ in -ily; -ity, -ible; and in initial weak be-, de-, re-, and e-.

Final /əl/, and also /ən/ and /əm/, are commonly realized as syllabic consonants, especially when /ən/ follows a pair of a vowel and a certain digraph (e.g. /ɛlt/, /ɑːrd/, or /ɔːrt/), or that of a diphthong or another vowel and /d/ or /t/ (e.g. /aɪt/, /iːd/). In accents without the merger, the use of /ɪ/, rather than /ə/, prevents the formation of syllabic consonants. Hence in RP, for example, the second syllable of Barton is pronounced as a syllabic [n̩], but that of Martin is [ɪn]. Many non-rhotic speakers also pronounce pattern with [n̩], which is accordingly homophonous with Patton.

Particularly in American linguistic tradition, the unmerged weak [ɪ]-type vowel is often transcribed with the barred i ⟨ɨ⟩, the IPA symbol for the close central unrounded vowel. Another symbol sometimes used is ⟨ᵻ⟩, the non-IPA symbol for a near-close central unrounded vowel. In the third edition of the OED, that symbol is used in the transcription of words (of the types listed above) that have free variation between /ɪ/ and /ə/ in RP.

Homophonous pairs
/ə/	/ɪ/	IPA	Notes
Aaron	Erin	ˈɛrən	With Mary-marry-merry merger.
accede	exceed	əkˈsiːd	
accept	except	əkˈsɛpt	
addition	edition	əˈdɪʃən	
Aleutian	elution	əˈl(j)uːʃən	
allide	elide	əˈlaɪd	
allied	elide	əˈlaɪd	
allision	elision	əˈlɪʒən	
allude	elude	əˈl(j)uːd	
alluded	eluted	əˈl(j)uːɾəd	With intervocalic alveolar flapping.
allusion	illusion	əˈl(j)uːʒən	
amend	emend	əˈmɛnd	
apatite	appetite	ˈæpətaɪt	
arrays	erase	əˈreɪz	Some accents pronounce erase as /ɪˈreɪs/.
barrel	beryl	ˈbɛrəl	With marry-merry merger.
battered	batted	ˈbætəd	Non-rhotic
bazaar	bizarre	bəˈzɑːr	
bettered	betted	ˈbɛtəd	Non-rhotic
bleachers	bleaches	ˈbliːtʃəz	Non-rhotic
brushers	brushes	ˈbrʌʃəz	Non-rhotic
bustard	busted	ˈbʌstəd	Non-rhotic
butchers	butches	ˈbʊtʃəz	Non-rhotic
buttered	butted	ˈbʌtəd	Non-rhotic
carat	caret	ˈkærət	
carrot	caret	ˈkærət	
censors	senses	ˈsɛnsəz	Non-rhotic
chartered	charted	ˈtʃɑːtəd	Non-rhotic
chattered	chatted	ˈtʃætəd	Non-rhotic
chiton	chitin	ˈkaɪtən	
chiton	kiting	ˈkaɪtən	With G-dropping.
chromous	chromis	ˈkroʊməs	
Devon	Devin	ˈdɛvən	
ferrous	Ferris	ˈfɛrəs	
foundered	founded	ˈfaʊndəd	Non-rhotic
humo(u)red	humid	ˈhjuːməd	Non-rhotic
installation	instillation	ˌɪnstəˈleɪʃən	
Karen	caring	ˈkɛrən	With G-dropping and with Mary-marry-merry merger.
Lennon	Lenin	ˈlɛnən	
mandrel	mandrill	ˈmændrəl	
mastered	masted	ˈmæstəd, ˈmɑːstəd	Non-rhotic
mattered	matted	ˈmætəd	Non-rhotic
mergers	merges	ˈmɜːdʒəz	Non-rhotic
modern	modding	ˈmɒdən	Non-rhotic with G-dropping.
officers	offices	ˈɒfəsəz	Non-rhotic
omission	emission	əˈmɪʃən	
parody	parity	ˈpærəɾi	With intervocalic alveolar flapping.
pattered	patted	ˈpætəd	Non-rhotic
pattern	patting	ˈpætən	Non-rhotic with G-dropping.
pigeon	pidgin	ˈpɪdʒən	
proscribe	prescribe	prəˈskraɪb	
racers	races	ˈreɪsəz	Non-rhotic
Rosa's	roses	ˈroʊzəz	
Saturn	satin	ˈsætən	Non-rhotic
scattered	scatted	ˈskætəd	Non-rhotic
seraph	serif	ˈsɛrəf	
splendo(u)red	splendid	ˈsplɛndəd	Non-rhotic
surplus	surplice	ˈsɜːrpləs	
tattered	tatted	ˈtætəd	Non-rhotic
taxers	taxes	ˈtæksəz	Non-rhotic
tendered	tended	ˈtɛndəd	Non-rhotic
titan	titin	ˈtaɪtən	

=== KIT–commA merger ===
A phonemic merger between KIT (the vowel /ɪ/) and word-internal commA (the vowel [ə] in gallop, distinct from word-final and sometimes also word-initial commA which can be analysed as STRUT: see above). The merger occurs in some Inland Northern American English (the areas in which the final stage of the Northern Cities Vowel Shift has been completed), New Zealand English, and also partially in South African English (specifically when not adjacent to a velar consonant; see kit–bit split). In New Zealand English (which is non-rhotic), the merger also encompasses the lettER lexical set, so villagers, lid, and balance all share the same vowel. This merger not to be confused with the weak vowel merger, which only merges unstressed KIT rather than KIT as a whole.

The merger is present in dialects where the quality of STRUT is far removed from [ɐ] (the word-final allophone of /ə/), such as Inland Northern American English, but can be a misleading name in the case of other accents.

=== Happy tensing ===
Happy tensing is a process whereby a final unstressed i-type vowel becomes tense [i] rather than lax [ɪ], today found in most dialects of English worldwide. That affects the final vowels of words such as happy, city, hurry, taxi, movie, Charlie, coffee, money and Chelsea. It may also apply in inflected forms of such words containing an additional final consonant sound, such as cities, Charlie's and hurried. It can also affect words such as me, he and she when they are used as clitics, as in show me, would he?

Until the 17th century, words in the happY lexical set could either end with the vowel of the PRICE lexical set (originally [iː], but diphthongized to [aɪ] etc. in the Great Vowel Shift) or a short [i] sound (some accents still exhibit alternation between that vowel and the happY vowel in words such as Sunday and Monday). It is not entirely clear when the vowel underwent the transition. The fact that tensing is uniformly present in South African English, Australian English and New Zealand English lends support to the idea that it may have already been present in southern British English in the early 19th century. However, it is not mentioned by descriptive phoneticians until the early 20th century and even then at first only in American English. The British phonetician Jack Windsor Lewis believed that the vowel moved from [i] to [ɪ] in Britain in the second quarter of the 19th century before it reverted to [i] in non-conservative British accents towards the last quarter of the 20th century.

The laxer [ɪ] pronunciation is also found in some Southern American English, in much of northern England and in Jamaica. In Scottish English, an [e] sound, similar to the Scottish realization of the vowel of day, may be used. It is also still found among some older speakers of Conservative RP. The tense [i] variant, however, is now established in as the norm in Standard Southern British and General American, and is also the usual form in Canada, Australia, New Zealand and South Africa, in southern England and in some northern English regions (such as Merseyside, Hull, and the entire North East).

The lax and tense variants of the happy vowel may be identified with the phonemes /ɪ/ and /iː/ respectively. They may also be considered to represent a neutralization between the two phonemes, but for speakers with the tense variant, there is the possibility of contrast in such pairs as taxis and taxes (see English phonology – vowels in unstressed syllables). Roach (2009) and Wells (2008) consider the tensing to be a neutralization between /ɪ/ and /iː/. Cruttenden (2014) regards the tense variant in Standard Southern British as still an allophone of /ɪ/ on the basis that it is shorter and more resistant to diphthongization than is /iː/. Lindsey (2019) regards the phenomenon to be a mere substitution of /iː/ for /ɪ/.

Most modern British dictionaries represent the happy vowel with the symbol ⟨i⟩ (distinct from both ⟨ɪ⟩ and ⟨iː⟩). That notation was first introduced in the Longman Dictionary of Contemporary English (1978) by its pronunciation editor, Gordon Walsh, and it was later taken up by Roach (1983), who extended it to ⟨u⟩ representing the weak vowel found word-medially in situation etc., and by some other dictionaries, including John C. Wells's Longman Pronunciation Dictionary (1990). In 2012, Wells wrote that the notation "seemed like a good idea at the time, but it clearly confuses a lot of people". Lindsey (2019) criticizes the notation for causing "widespread belief in a specific 'happY vowel'" that "never existed".

== Additional mergers ==
The kit–strut merger is possible in some Glaswegian speech in Scotland. As a result, pairs like fin and fun are homophones.

The mitt–meet merger is a phenomenon occurring in Malaysian English and Singaporean English in which the phonemes /iː/ and /ɪ/ are both pronounced /i/. As a result, pairs like mitt and meet, bit and beat, and bid and bead are homophones.

The met–mat merger is a phenomenon occurring in Malaysian English, Singaporean English and Hong Kong English in which the phonemes /ɛ/ and /æ/ are both pronounced /ɛ/. For some speakers, it occurs only before voiceless consonants, and pairs like met, mat, bet, bat are homophones, but bed, bad or med, mad are kept distinct. For others, it occurs in all positions.

The met–mate merger is a phenomenon occurring for some speakers of Zulu English in which the phonemes /eɪ/ and /ɛ/ are both pronounced /ɛ/. As a result, the words met and mate are homophonous as /mɛt/.

== See also ==
- Phonological history of English
- Phonological history of English vowels

== Bibliography ==
- Ashby, Michael; Ashby, Patricia; Baldwin, John; Holmes, Frederika; House, Jill; Maidment, John (1994). "Broad transcription in phonetic training". Speech, Hearing and Language: Work in Progress (8): 33–40.
- Bauer, Laurie; Warren, Paul; Bardsley, Dianne; Kennedy, Marianna; Major, George (2007). "New Zealand English". Journal of the International Phonetic Association. 37 (1): 97–102. doi:10.1017/S0025100306002830.
- Cruttenden, Alan (2014). Gimson's Pronunciation of English (8th ed.). Routledge. ISBN 9781444183092.
- Kortmann, Bernd; Schneider, Edgar W., eds. (2004). A Handbook of Varieties of English: CD-ROM. Walter de Gruyter. ISBN 3110175320.
- Lindsey, Geoff (2019). English After RP: Standard British Pronunciation Today. Palgrave Macmillan. ISBN 978-3-030-04356-8.
- Roach, Peter (1983). English Phonetics and Phonology: A Practical Course. Cambridge University Press. ISBN 0-521-28252-7.
- Roach, Peter (2009). English Phonetics and Phonology: A Practical Course (4th ed.). Cambridge University Press. ISBN 978-0-521-71740-3.
- Wells, John C. (1982). Accents of English. Vol. 1: An Introduction (pp. i–xx, 1–278), Vol. 2: The British Isles (pp. i–xx, 279–466), Vol. 3: Beyond the British Isles (pp. i–xx, 467–674). Cambridge University Press. doi:10.1017/CBO9780511611759, doi:10.1017/CBO9780511611766. ISBN 0-52129719-2, 0-52128540-2, 0-52128541-0.
- Wells, John C. (2008). Longman Pronunciation Dictionary (3rd ed.). Harlow: Pearson Education. ISBN 978-1-4058-8118-0.
