= Standard Canadian English =

Variety of Canadian English

Speech example
An example of a female speaker from Southern Ontario (Margaret Atwood).

Speech example
An example of a male speaker from Alberta (Mark Carney).

Standard Canadian English is the largely homogeneous variety of Canadian English that is spoken particularly across Ontario and Western Canada, as well as throughout Canada among urban middle-class speakers from English-speaking families, excluding the regional dialects of Atlantic Canadian English. Canadian English has a mostly uniform phonology and much less dialectal diversity than neighbouring American English. In particular, Standard Canadian English is defined by the cot–caught merger to [ɒ] and an accompanying chain shift of vowel sounds, which is called the Canadian Shift. A subset of the dialect geographically at its central core, excluding British Columbia to the west and everything east of Montreal, has been called Inland Canadian English. It is further defined by both of the phenomena that are known as Canadian raising (which is found also in British Columbia and Ontario): the production of /oʊ/ (Note: The GOAT phoneme is here transcribed as a diphthong /oʊ/, in accordance with leading phonologists on Canadian English like William Labov, Charles Boberg, and others, though monophthongal phonetic variants are also common in actual speech.) and /aʊ/ with back starting points in the mouth and the production of /eɪ/ with a front starting point and very little glide that is almost [e] in the Canadian Prairies.

== Phonetics and phonology ==
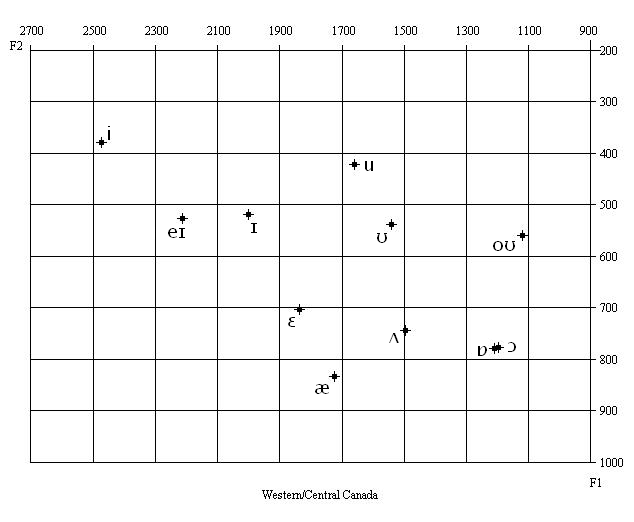
Based on Labov et al.; averaged F1/F2 means for speakers from Western and Central Canada. Note that /ɒ/ and /ɔ/ are indistinguishable and that /æ/ and /ɛ/ are very open.

Standard Canadian vowels
	Front		Central		Back	
	lax	tense	lax	tense	lax	tense
Close	ɪ	i		u	ʊ	
Mid	ɛ	eɪ	ə		(ʌ)	oʊ
Open			æ			ɒ
Diphthongs	aɪ ɔɪ aʊ (ʌɪ) (ʌʊ)					

- Vowel length is a secondary phonemic feature of tense vowels in Canadian English, with the lowered variant of /ɛ/ and the tense variant of /æ/ being distinguished entirely by length for some speakers
- The phonemes /oʊ/ (as in boat) and /eɪ/ (as in bait) behave as monophthongs phonologically, and are often pronounced as such, especially in the Prairie Provinces.

=== Back vowel fronting ===
The onset of unraised /aʊ/ is usually low central [äʊ], though it may be fronted before nasals. /oʊ/ usually remains backed [oʊ~o], unlike the fronted values found in the South, the Midland or California. That said, fronted pronunciations of /oʊ/ may exist for some younger speakers. In addition, some younger speakers front and lower /ʊ/.

Unlike most Northern American English, /u/ is generally fronted in Canadian English. In Victoria, where the historical distinction between post-coronal /ju/ and /u/ is often maintained, the latter may be so front as to gain a [j]-like onglide.

=== Low-back merger ===
Almost all Canadians have the cot–caught merger, which also occurs primarily in the Western United States but also often elsewhere in the country, especially recently. Few Canadians distinguish the vowels in cot and caught, which merge as [ɒ] (more common in Western and central Canada) or [ɑ] (more common in the Maritimes and eastern mainland Canada in which it can even be fronted). Speakers with the merger often fail to hear the difference when speakers without the merger, such as General American (GenAm) and Inland Northern American English, pronounce the vowels. The merger has existed in Canada for several generations.

Some speakers may not exhibit the merger, especially older speakers and those living in rural areas or in the Prairies.

The standard pronunciation of /ɑr/ (as in start) is [ɑɹ], as in GenAm, or perhaps somewhat fronted as [ɑ̈ɹ]. As with Canadian raising, the advancement of the raised nucleus can be a regional indicator. A striking feature of Atlantic Canadian speech (in the Maritime Provinces and Newfoundland) is a nucleus that approaches the front region of the vowel space; it is accompanied by a strong rhoticity ranging from [ɜɹ] to [ɐɹ].

Words such as origin, Florida, horrible, quarrel, warren, as well as tomorrow, sorry, sorrow, generally use the sound sequence of FORCE, rather than START. The latter set of words often distinguishes Canadian from American pronunciation. In Standard Canadian English, there is no distinction between horse and hoarse.

Loanwords that have a low central vowel in their language of origin, such as llama, pasta, and pyjamas, as well as place names like Gaza and Vietnam, tend to have /æ/, rather than /ɒ/ (which includes the historical /ɑ/, /ɒ/ and /ɔ/ because of the father–bother and cot–caught mergers). That also applies to older loans like drama or Apache. The word khaki is sometimes pronounced /ˈkɒki/ (or even /ˈkɒrki/). The pronunciation of drama with /æ/ is in decline, and studies found that 83% of Canadians used /æ/ in 1956, 47% in 1999, and 10% in 2012. More generally, younger speakers tend to use /ɒ/ more than they did before, though there's still quite a bit of variation. Some words, including plaza, façade, and lava will take a low central phone [ä], possibly distinct from both /æ/ and /ɒ/.

=== Canadian Shift ===
The cot-caught merger creates a gap in the short vowel subsystem and triggers a sound change known as the Canadian Shift, which involves the front lax vowels /æ, ɛ, ɪ/. The /æ/ of bat is lowered and retracted in the direction of [a] except in some environments, as is noted below. Indeed, /æ/ is farther back than in almost all other North American dialects, and the retraction of /æ/ was independently observed in Vancouver and is more advanced for Ontarians and for women than for people from the Prairies and Atlantic Canada and men.

Then, /ɛ/ and /ɪ/ may be lowered (close to [æ] and [e]) and/or retracted, but studies actually disagree on the trajectory of the shift. For example, Labov and others (2006) noted a backward and downward movement of /ɛ/ in apparent time in all of Canada except the Atlantic Provinces, but no movement of /ɪ/ was detected. In unstressed syllables, the phoneme /ɪ/ is usually lowered for the majority of speakers: message [ˈmæse̞d͡ʒ], captain [ˈkʰaːpte̞n], visit [ˈvɪze̞t], ticket [ˈtʰɪke̞t], women [ˈwɪme̞n], etc.

Therefore, in Canadian English, the short a of trap or bath and the broad ah quality of spa or lot are shifted oppositely from those of the Northern Cities shift, which is found across the border in Inland Northern American English, and is causing both dialects to diverge. In fact, the Canadian short-a is very similar in quality to Inland Northern spa or lot. For example, the production [maːp] would be understood as map in Canada, but it sounds more like mop in Inland Northern United States.

=== /æ/-raising ===
Unlike many American English dialects, /æ/ remains a low-front vowel in most environments in Canadian English. Raising along the front periphery of the vowel space is restricted to two environments, before nasal and voiced velar consonants, and even then varies regionally. Ontario and Maritime Canadian English often show some raising before nasals, but it is less extreme than in many American varieties. Much less raising is heard on the Prairies, and some ethnic groups in Montreal show no pre-nasal raising at all. On the other hand, some speakers in the Prairies and British Columbia have raising of /æ/ before voiced velars (/ɡ/ and /ŋ/, with an up-glide rather than an in-glide, such that bag may almost rhyme with vague. For most Canadian speakers, /ɛ/ is also realized higher as [e] before /ɡ/.

/æ/ raising in North American English
Following consonant	Example words	New York City, New Orleans	Baltimore, Philadelphia	Midland US, New England, Pittsburgh, Western US	Canada, Northern Mountain US	Minnesota, Wisconsin	Southern US	Great Lakes US
Non-prevocalic /m, n/	fan, lamb, stand	[ɛə] (Note: In New York City and Philadelphia, most function words (am, can, had, etc.) and some learned or less common words (alas, carafe, lad, etc.) have [æ].) (Note: In Philadelphia, the irregular verbs began, ran, and swam have [æ].)		[ɛə]	[ɛə]		[ɛə~ɛjə]	[ɛə]
Prevocalic /m, n/	animal, planet, Spanish	[æ]		[ɛə]	[ɛə]		[ɛə~ɛjə]	[ɛə]
/ŋ/	frank, language	[æ]		[ɛː~eɪ~æ]	[ɛː~ɛj]	[eː~ej]	[æ~æɛə]	[ɛə]
Prevocalic /ɡ/	dragon, magazine	[æ]		[æ] (Note: The untensed /æ/ may be lowered and retracted as much as [ä] in varieties affected by the Low-Back-Merger Shift, mainly predominant in Canada and the American West.)	[ɛː~ɛj]	[eː~ej]	[æ~æɛə]	[ɛə]
Non-prevocalic /ɡ/	bag, drag	[ɛə]	[æ] (Note: In Philadelphia, bad, mad, and glad alone in this context have [ɛə].)	[æ]	[ɛː~ɛj]	[eː~ej]	[æ~æɛə]	[ɛə]
Non-prevocalic /b, d, ʃ/	grab, flash, sad	[ɛə]	[æ]	[æ]	[æ]	[ɛə]	[æ~æɛə]	[ɛə]
Non-prevocalic /f, θ, s/	ask, bath, half, glass	[ɛə]		[æ]	[æ]	[ɛə]	[æ~æɛə]	[ɛə]
Otherwise	as, back, happy, locality	[æ] (Note: In New York City, certain lexical exceptions exist (like avenue being tense) and variability is common before /dʒ/ and /z/ as in imagine, magic, and jazz. In New Orleans, [ɛə] additionally occurs before /v/ and /z/.)		[æ]	[æ]	[ɛə]	[æ~æɛə]	[ɛə]

=== Canadian raising ===
Perhaps the most recognizable feature of Canadian English is "Canadian raising," which is found most prominently throughout central and west-central Canada and in parts of the Atlantic Provinces. For the beginning points of the diphthongs (gliding vowels) /aɪ/ (as in the words height and mice) and /aʊ/ (as in shout and house), the tongue is often more "raised" than in other varieties of English in the mouth when the diphthongs are before voiceless consonants: /p/, /t/, /k/, /s/, /ʃ/, and /f/.

Before voiceless consonants, /aɪ/ becomes [ʌɪ~ɜɪ~ɐɪ]. One of the few phonetic variables that divides Canadians regionally is the articulation of the raised allophone of that and /aʊ/. In Ontario, it tends to have a mid-central or even mid-front articulation sometimes approaching [ɛʊ], but in the West and the Maritimes, a more retracted sound is heard, which is closer to [ʌʊ]. For some speakers in the Prairies and in Nova Scotia, the retraction is strong enough to cause some tokens of raised /aʊ/ to merge with /oʊ/; couch then merges with coach, and both words sound the same (/koʊtʃ/). Also, about then sounds like a boat, which is often inaccurately represented as sounding like "a boot" for comic effect in American popular culture.

In GenAm, out is typically [äʊt], but with slight Canadian raising, it may sound more like [ɐʊt], and with the strong Canadian raising of the Prairies and Nova Scotia, it may sound more like [ʌʊt]. Canadian raising makes words like height and hide have two different vowel qualities. Also, for example, house as a noun (I saw a house) and house as a verb (Where will you house them tonight?) can then have two different vowel qualities: [hɐʊs] and [haʊz].

Especially in parts of the Atlantic Provinces, some Canadians do not have Canadian raising. On the other hand, certain non-Canadian accents use Canadian raising. In the United States, it can be found in areas near the border in dialects in the Upper Midwest, Pacific Northwest, and Northeastern New England (like Boston) dialects, but Canadian raising is much less common than in Canada. The raising of /aɪ/ alone is actually increasing throughout the United States and, unlike the raising of /aʊ/, is generally not perceived as unusual by people who do not exhibit the raising.

Because of Canadian raising, many speakers can distinguish between words such as writer and rider, which can otherwise be pronounced the same in North American dialects, which typically turn both intervocalic /t/ and /d/ into an alveolar flap. Thus, writer and rider are distinguished solely by their vowel characteristics as determined by Canadian raising, which causes a split between rider as [ˈɹäɪɾɚ] and writer as [ˈɹɐɪɾɚ].

== Phonemic incidence ==
Although Canadian English phonology is part of the greater North American sound system and so is therefore similar to American English phonology, the pronunciation of particular words may have British influence, and other pronunciations are uniquely Canadian. The Cambridge History of the English Language states, "What perhaps most characterizes Canadian speakers, however, is their use of several possible variant pronunciations for the same word, sometimes even in the same sentence."

- The name of the letter Z is normally the Anglo-European (and French) zed, and the American zee is less common in Canada and often stigmatized.
- Lieutenant was historically pronounced as the British /lɛfˈtɛnənt/, rather than the American /luˈtɛnənt/, and older speakers and official usage in military and government contexts typically still follow the older practice, but most younger speakers and many middle-aged speakers have shifted to the American pronunciation. Some middle-aged speakers cannot even remember the existence of the older pronunciation, even when they are specifically asked whether they can think of another pronunciation. Only 14-19% of 14-year-olds used the traditional pronunciation in a survey in 1972, and in early 2017, they were at least 57 years old.
- In the words adult and composite, the stress is usually on the first syllable (/ˈædʌlt/ ~ /ˈædəlt/, /ˈkɒmpəzət/), as in Britain.
- Canadians often side with the British on the pronunciation of lever /ˈlivər/, and several other words; been is pronounced by many speakers as /bin/, rather than /bɪn/; and either and neither are more commonly /ˈaɪðər/ and /ˈnaɪðər/, respectively.
- Furthermore, in accordance with British traditions, schedule is sometimes /ˈʃɛdʒul/; process, progress, and project are occasionally pronounced /ˈproʊsɛs/, /ˈproʊɡrɛs/, and /ˈproʊdʒɛkt/, respectively; harass and harassment are sometimes pronounced /ˈhærəs/ and /ˈhærəsmənt/ respectively, (Note: The pronunciation with the stress on the second syllable is the most common pronunciation but is considered incorrect by some people.) and leisure is rarely /ˈlɛʒər/.
- Shone is pronounced /ʃɒn/, rather than /ʃoʊn/.
- Again and against are often pronounced /əˈɡeɪn, əˈɡeɪnst/, rather than /əˈɡɛn, əˈɡɛnst/.
- Words like semi, anti, and multi tend to be pronounced /ˈsɛmi/, /ˈænti/, and /ˈmʌlti/, rather than /ˈsɛmaɪ/, /ˈæntaɪ/, and /ˈmʌltaɪ/.
- Words of French origin, such as clique and niche, are pronounced with a high vowel as in French, with /klik/ rather than /klɪk/ and /niʃ/ rather than /nɪtʃ/. Other words such as foyer (/ˈfɔɪ.eɪ/) have a French-influenced pronunciation.
- Pecan is usually /ˈpikæn/ or /piˈkæn/, as opposed to /pəˈkɒn/, which more common in the United States.
- The most common pronunciation of vase is /veɪz/. Resource, diagnose, and visa also have /z/.
- The word premier, the leader of a provincial or territorial government, is commonly pronounced /ˈprimjər/, but /ˈprɛmjɛr/ and /ˈprimjɛr/ are rare variants.
- Some Canadians pronounce predecessor as /ˈpridəsɛsər/ and asphalt as /ˈæʃfɒlt/.
- The word room is pronounced /rum/ or /rʊm/.
- Many anglophone Montrealers pronounced French names with a Quebec accent: Trois-Rivières [tʁ̥wɑʁiˈvjæːʁ] or [tʁ̥wɑʁiˈvjaɛ̯ʁ].
- The pour-poor merger is less common than in GenAm.

== Features shared with General American ==
Like most other North American English dialects, Canadian English is almost always spoken with a rhotic accent, meaning that the r sound is preserved in any environment and not "dropped" after vowels, as commonly done by, for example, speakers in central and southern England where it is only pronounced when preceding a vowel.

Like GenAm, Canadian English possesses a wide range of phonological mergers, many of which are not found in other major varieties of English: the Mary–marry–merry merger which makes word pairs like Barry/berry, Carrie/Kerry, hairy/Harry, perish/parish, etc. as well as trios like airable/errable/arable and Mary/merry/marry have identical pronunciations (however, a distinction between the marry and merry sets remains in Montreal); the father–bother merger that makes lager/logger, con/Kahn, etc. sound identical; the very common horse–hoarse merger making pairs like for/four, horse/hoarse, morning/mourning, war/wore etc. perfect homophones (as in California English, the vowel is phonemicized as /oʊ/ due to the cot–caught merger: /foʊr/ etc.); the hurry-furry merger; and the prevalent wine–whine merger which produces homophone pairs like Wales/whales, wear/where, wine/whine etc. by, in most cases, eliminating /hw/ (ʍ), except in some older speakers.

In addition to that, flapping of intervocalic /t/ and /d/ to alveolar tap [ɾ] before reduced vowels is ubiquitous, so the words ladder and latter, for example, are mostly or entirely pronounced the same. Therefore, the pronunciation of the word "British" /ˈbrɪtəʃ/ in Canada and the U.S. is most often [ˈbɹɪɾɪʃ], while in England it is commonly [ˈbɹɪtɪʃ] or [ˈbɹɪʔɪʃ]. For some speakers, the merger is incomplete and 't' before a reduced vowel is sometimes not tapped following /eɪ/ or /ɪ/ when it represents underlying 't'; thus greater and grader, and unbitten and unbidden are distinguished.

Many Canadian speakers have the typical American dropping of /j/ after alveolar consonants, so that new, duke, Tuesday, suit, resume, lute, for instance, are pronounced /nu/ (rather than /nju/), /duk/, /ˈtuzdeɪ/, /sut/, /rəˈzum/, /lut/. Traditionally, glide retention in these contexts has occasionally been held to be a shibboleth distinguishing Canadians from Americans. However, in a survey conducted in the Golden Horseshoe area of Southern Ontario in 1994, over 80% of respondents under the age of 40 pronounced student and news, for instance, without /j/. This glide-deletion is less common in Victoria, though younger speakers front /u/ to such a degree after coronals that some words can take a [j]-like onglide. Canadians do include /j/ in revenue and avenue.

Especially in Vancouver and Toronto, an increasing number of Canadians realize /ɪŋ/ as [in] when the raising of /ɪ/ to [i] before the underlying /ŋ/ is applied even after the "g" is dropped, leading to a variant pronunciation of taking, [ˈteɪkin]. Otherwise it primarily is found in speakers from not just California but also from other Western states and Midwestern areas including the Upper Midwest. Speakers who use the [in] variant use it only for the underlying /ɪŋ/, which makes taking with a dropped "g" no longer homophonous with taken. This pronunciation is otherwise perceived as incorrect and has been described as a "corruption of the language" by some listeners.

== Bibliography ==
- Baker, Adam; Mielke, Jeff; Archangeli, Diana (2008). "More velar than /g/: Consonant Coarticulation as a Cause of Diphthongization" (PDF). In Chang, Charles B.; Haynie, Hannah J. (eds.). Proceedings of the 26th West Coast Conference on Formal Linguistics. Somerville, Massachusetts: Cascadilla Proceedings Project. pp. 60–68. ISBN 978-1-57473-423-2.
- Boberg, Charles (2008). "Regional phonetic differentiation in Standard Canadian English". Journal of English Linguistics. 36 (2): 129–154. doi:10.1177/0075424208316648. S2CID 146478485.
- Boberg, Charles (2020). "Foreign (a) in North American English: Variation and Change in Loan Phonology". Journal of English Linguistics. 48 (1): 31–71. doi:10.1177/0075424219896397.
- Duncan, Daniel (2016). "'Tense' /æ/ is still lax: A phonotactics study" (PDF). In Hansson, Gunnar Ólafur; Farris-Trimble, Ashley; McMullin, Kevin; Pulleyblank, Douglas (eds.). Supplemental Proceedings of the 2015 Annual Meeting on Phonology. Vol. 3. Washington, D.C.: Linguistic Society of America. doi:10.3765/amp.v3i0.3653.
- Labov, William (2007). "Transmission and Diffusion" (PDF). Language. 83 (2): 344–387. doi:10.1353/lan.2007.0082. JSTOR 40070845. S2CID 6255506.
- Labov, William; Ash, Sharon; Boberg, Charles (2006). The Atlas of North American English. Berlin: Mouton de Gruyter. ISBN 978-3-11-016746-7.
