= Northern American English =

Variety of American English

- English
- Native to: United States
- Region: Northern United States
- Language family: Indo-European: Germanic; West Germanic; Ingvaeonic; Anglo–Frisian; Anglic; English; North American English; American English; Northern American English
- Early forms: Old English: Middle English; Early Modern English

Language codes
- ISO 639-3: –
- Glottolog: nort3316
- 21st century research unites the brown region of this map as a Northern U.S. superdialect region. Notice that the Northwest and much of New England are not included.

Northern American English or Northern U.S. English (also, Northern AmE) is a class of historically related American English dialects, spoken by predominantly white Americans, in much of the Great Lakes region and some of the Northeast region within the United States. The North as a superdialect region is documented by the 2006 Atlas of North American English (ANAE), based strictly on phonetic (accent) features, in the greater metropolitan areas of Connecticut, Western Massachusetts, Western and Central New York, Northwestern New Jersey, Northeastern Pennsylvania, Northern Ohio, Northern Indiana, Northern Illinois, Northeastern Nebraska, and Eastern South Dakota, plus among certain demographics or areas within Michigan, Wisconsin, Minnesota, Vermont, and New York's Hudson Valley. In summary, "the North" consists of the Inland Northern dialect (in the eastern Great Lakes region) and Southwestern New England dialect.

The ANAE argues that, though geographically located in the Northern United States, current-day New York City, Eastern New England, Northwestern U.S., and some Upper Midwestern accents do not fit under the Northern U.S. accent spectrum, or only marginally. Each has one or more phonological characteristics that disqualifies them or, for the latter two, exhibit too much internal variation to classify definitively. Meanwhile, Central and Western Canadian English is presumed to have originated, but branched off, from Northern U.S. English within the past two or three centuries.

Most broadly, the ANAE classifies Northern American accents as rhotic, distinguished from Southern U.S. accents by retaining /aɪ/ as a diphthong (unlike the South, which commonly monophthongizes this sound) and from Western U.S. and Canadian accents by mostly preserving the distinction between the /ɑ/ and /ɔ/ sounds in words like cot versus caught (though the latter feature appears to be changing among the younger generations).

In the very early 20th century, a generic Northern American accent was the basis for the term "General American", though regional accents have now since developed in some areas of the North.

== Phonology ==
The ANAE defines a Northern linguistic super-region of American English dialects as having:

- /oʊ/ (as in goat, toe, show, etc.) and traditionally /u/ (as in goose, too, shoe, etc.) pronounced conservatively far in the back of the mouth.
- "r-fulness" or rhoticity (though r-dropping is possible in Rhode Island and some areas that are geographically though not linguistically Northern: New York City and eastern coastal New England).
- A common lack of the cot–caught merger, meaning that words like pond and pawned, or bot and bought, are not pronounced identically (with the second of this class of words being pronounced usually farther back in the mouth and with more rounded lips); however, the merger is common in northern New England and spreading among younger Northerners generally.
- Raising of /aɪ/ before voiceless consonants, including in the Great Lakes area, and elsewhere in New England.
  - This type of raising also appears to be spreading beyond the North, appearing also in California English, Philadelphia English, and Western American English dialects overall. "Canadian raising"—the lifting of the body of the tongue in both /aɪ/ and /aʊ/ before voiceless consonants (therefore, in words, like height, slight, advice, clout, ouch, lout, etc., but not in words like hide, slide, advise, cloud, gouge, loud, etc.)—is common in eastern New England, for example in Boston (and the traditional accent of Martha's Vineyard), as well as in the Upper Midwest.

The Northern Cities Vowel Shift is a series of sound changes in the North that covers a large area from western New York State west through the U.S. Great Lakes region and some of the Upper Midwest.

=== Phonemic distribution ===
The following pronunciation variants used more strongly in this region than anywhere else in the country:

- apricot as /ˈæprɪkɑt/ (rather than /ˈeɪprɪkɑt/)
- been as /bɛn/ (a homophone with the name Ben)
- crayon as the single-syllable /kræn/ (phonetically [kɹɛən])
- pajamas as /pəˈdʒæməz/ (in addition to /pəˈdʒɑməz/ more widely common around Boston, New York City, and the South)
- handkerchief rhyming with beef
- poem as the single-syllable /poʊm/, rhyming with dome
- root and roof using the FOOT vowel [ʊ] as a somewhat common alternative to the typical GOOSE vowel [u]

=== Declining characteristics ===
The North has historically been one of the last U.S. regions to maintain the distinction between /ɔr/ and /oʊr/, in which words like horse and hoarse or war and wore, for example, are not homophones; however, the merger of the two has quickly spread throughout the North. The KIT vowel [ɪ] was once a common Northern U.S. sound in the word creek, but this has largely given way to the FLEECE vowel [i], as in the rest of the country.

== Vocabulary ==
The North is reported as uniquely or most strongly using certain words:

- babushka (a woman's headscarf, tied under the chin)
- bare-naked (synonym for naked)
- crayfish (a freshwater lobster-like crustacean)
- crust (the end of a bread loaf)
- diagonal or kitty-corner (situated slanted across a street or intersection)
- doing cookies (rare synonym, scattered throughout the North, for doing doughnuts)
- frosting (synonym for icing)
- futz or futz around (/fʌts/; to fool around or waste time)
- garbage (synonym for trash)
- on the fritz (out of order, or into a state of disrepair)
- pit (the seed or stone of a fruit)
- you guys (the usual plural form of you)
- woodchuck (synonym for groundhog)

== Northeastern American English ==
Northeastern American English occurs in the red areas, particularly along the Atlantic coast.

A Northeastern corridor of the United States follows the Atlantic coast, comprising all the dialects of New England, Greater New York City, and Greater Philadelphia (including adjacent areas of New Jersey), sometimes even classified as extending to Greater Baltimore, Washington D.C., and New York's Hudson Valley north of New York City. This large region, despite being home to numerous different dialects and accents, constitutes a huge area unified in certain linguistic respects, including particular notable vocabulary and phonemic incidence.

=== Phonemic distribution ===
These phonemic variants in certain words are particularly correlated with the American Northeast (with the more common variants nationwide given in parentheses):

- cauliflower with the "i" pronounced with the fleece vowel /i/ (in addition to the KIT vowel /ɪ/)
- centaur rhyming with four (in addition to the variant rhyming with far)
- miracle as /ˈmɛrəkəl/ or /ˈmirəkəl/ (in addition to /ˈmɪrəkəl/)
- route rhyming with shoot (in addition to shout)
- syrup as /ˈsirəp/ or /ˈsɪrəp/ (in addition to /ˈsɜrəp/)
- tour and tournament with /tɔr/ (like tore)
- vase as /veɪz/ or /vɑz/ (rhyming with stays or spas, in addition to the more General American /veɪs/, rhyming with space)

The Northeast tends to retain a contrastive /ɔ/ vowel (in words like all, caught, flaw, loss, thought, etc.): specifically, this is realized as [ɒ~ɔə]. Northern New England and many younger speakers do not retain this vowel, however. Non-rhoticity or "r"-dropping is variable in Eastern New England and New York City, though gradually declining.

=== Vocabulary ===
Terms common or even usual to the whole Northeast include:

- brook (synonym for stream)
- bureau (synonym for chest of drawers or dresser)
- cellar (synonym for basement)
- cruller (a twisted, often stick-like doughnut)
- goose pimples (synonym for goose bumps),
- elastic, hair elastic, or hair thing (synonyms for hair tie)
- papering or TP'ing (synonym for toilet papering)
- rotary (synonym for traffic circle)
- sneakers (any athletic shoes)
- soda (any sweet, carbonated soft drink)
- stoop (small outdoor staircase to a building's front door, particularly in the NYC area)
- sunshower (a sunny rainshower)
- tractor trailer (a semi-trailer truck)

=== Elite Northeastern American English ===
A cultivated or elite Northeastern U.S. accent, such as a "Boston Brahmin accent" in Boston, was once associated with members of upper-class Northeastern (largely, New England and New York) families in the late 19th and early 20th centuries. In 1988, the documentary American Tongues featured interviews with two Brahmin speakers who estimated that there were about 1000 such Brahmins left. Notable example speakers included many members of the Kennedy family, including President John F. Kennedy, whose accent is not an ordinary Boston accent so much as a "tony Harvard accent". This accent included non-rhoticity and even, variably, a non-rhotic pronunciation of NURSE, a resistance to the cot-caught merger, and a resistance to the Mary-marry-merry merger. Variably, speakers dipped into other then-prestigious features, such as the TRAP–BATH split ([æ] versus [a]), no happY tensing, and a backed pronunciation of START, though some New England speakers pronounced it more fronted. This accent corresponds in its time-frame and in much of its sound with a cultivated transatlantic accent promoted in theatrical and elocution courses in the same era.

== Inland Northern American English ==
Inland North American English appears in all these states, especially in areas along the Great Lakes

The recent Northern Cities Vowel Shift, beginning only in the twentieth century, now affects much of the North away from the Atlantic coast, occurring specifically at its geographic center: the Great Lakes region. It is therefore a defining feature of the Inland North dialect (most notably spoken in Chicago, Detroit, and western New York State). The vowel shift's generating conditions are also present in some Western New England English; otherwise, however, this vowel shift is not occurring in the Northeastern United States.

== Transitional dialects ==
North-Central American or Upper Midwestern English, based around Minnesota, northern Wisconsin, and North Dakota, may show some elements of the Northern Cities Vowel Shift and the ANAE classifies it as a transitional dialect between the Inland North, Canada, and the West. Many Upper Midwesterners have a full cot-caught merger, however, which disqualifies this dialect from the ANAE's traditional definition for a "Northern" dialect region in the United States.

Northwestern American English similarly does not qualify under the ANAE definition, instead falling broadly under Western American English, not Northern. Northwestern accents are not yet identified by linguists as settling into a singular stable variety; its speakers share major commonalities with both Californian and Canadian accents.
