= Low-back-merger shift =

Vowel shift

The low-back-merger shift is a chain shift of vowel sounds found in several accents of North American English, beginning in the last quarter of the 20th century and most significantly involving the low back merger (which collapses together the low-back vowel sounds: /ɑː/, /ɒ/, and /ɔː/ in words like PALM, LOT, and THOUGHT respectively) accompanied by the lowering and backing of each of the front-lax vowels: /æ/, /ɛ/, and /ɪ/ (in words like TRAP, DRESS, and KIT respectively).

The back and downward movement of all the front lax vowels was first noted as distinguishing certain California English speakers in 1987, and it was soon known by linguists as the California vowel shift. Then, it came to distinguish certain Canadian English speakers in a 1995 study, now known in that variety as the Canadian shift; today, it helps define Standard Canadian English. The California and Canadian Shifts were initially reported as two separate phenomena, but the same basic pattern was next documented among some younger varieties of Western New England English, Western American English, Pacific Northwest English, and Midland American English, all in speakers born from the 1980s onward. Linguists have proposed possible relationships between the low back merger and the similarly structured shifts in these regional dialects, though no unifying hypothesis is dominantly agreed upon yet. Assuming the similar chain shifts found in Canada and various parts of the U.S. have a single common origin, a variety of names have been proposed for this trans-regional chain shift which, besides the low-back-merger shift, include the third dialect shift, elsewhere shift, short front vowel shift, and North American shift.

Aside from the low-back-merger shift characterizing these North American varieties, similar, though not identical, shifts to the short front vowels are also attested in other English dialects globally as of 21st-century research, including Standard Southern British, Indian English, Hiberno-English, South African English, and Australian English (the last two dialects traditionally defined by a chain shift moving in the opposite direction of the Low-Back-Merger Shift). These changes outside of North America particularly intrigue linguists as they lack the vowel configuration presumed to initiate this shift: the low back merger.

== Canadian Shift ==
Vowels of Toronto English on a vowel chart, from Tse (2018:141). It shows the Canadian Shift from [ɪ, ɛ, æ] towards [ɘ, ɛ̠, ä] as well as the cot–caught merger towards a rounded open back vowel [ɒ].

The Canadian Shift involves the lowering of the tongue in the front lax vowels /æ/ (the short-a of trap), /ɛ/ (the short-e of dress), and /ɪ/ (the short-i of kit).

It is triggered by the cot–caught merger: /ɑ/ (as in cot) and /ɔ/ (as in caught) merge as [ɒ], a low back rounded vowel. As each space opens up, the next vowel along moves into it. Thus, the short a /æ/ retracts from a near-low front position to a low central position, with a quality similar to the vowel heard in Northern England [a]. The retraction of /æ/ was independently observed in Vancouver and is more advanced for Ontarians and women than for people from the Prairies or Atlantic Canada and men. /æ/ also retracts more before /l/ than other consonants. In Toronto, /æ/-retraction is inhibited by a following nasal, but it is not in Vancouver.

However, scholars disagree on the behaviour of /ɛ/ and /ɪ/:

The Canadian Shift according to Clarke (red), Boberg (blue), and both (purple)

- According to Clarke et al. (1995), who impressionistically studied the speech of a few young Ontarians, /ɛ/ and /ɪ/ tend to lower in the direction of [æ] and [ɛ], respectively. Hence, bet and bit tend to sound, respectively, like bat and bet as pronounced by a speaker without the shift.
- Labov et al. (2006), through acoustic analysis of 33 subjects from all over the country, noted a backward and downward movement of /ɛ/ in apparent time in all of Canada except the Atlantic Provinces. No movement of /ɪ/ was detected.
- Boberg (2005) considers the primary movement of /ɛ/ and /ɪ/ to be retraction, at least in Montreal. He studied a diverse range of English-speaking Montrealers and found that younger speakers had a significantly retracted /ɛ/ and /ɪ/ compared with older speakers but did not find that the vowels were significantly lower. A small group of young people from Ontario were also studied, and there too retraction was most evident. Under this scenario, a similar group of vowels (short front) are retracting in a parallel manner, with /ɛ/ and /ʌ/ approaching each other. Therefore, with Boberg's results, bet approaches but remains different from but, and bit sounds different but remains distinct.
- Hagiwara (2006), through acoustic analysis, noted that /ɛ/ and /ɪ/ do not seem to be lowered in Winnipeg, although the lowering and retraction of /æ/ has caused a redistribution of backness values for the front lax vowels.
- Sadlier-Brown and Tamminga (2008) studied a few speakers from Vancouver and Halifax and found the shift to be active in Halifax as well, although not as advanced as in Vancouver. For these speakers, the movement of /ɛ/ and /ɪ/ in apparent time was diagonal, and Halifax had /æ/ diagonal movement too; in Vancouver, however, the retraction of /æ/ was not accompanied by lowering.

Due to the Canadian Shift, the short-a and the short-o are shifted in opposite directions to that of the Northern cities vowel shift, found across the border in the Inland Northern U.S. and Western New England, which is causing these two dialects to diverge: the Canadian short-a is very similar in quality to the Inland Northern short-o. For example, the production [kʰat] would be recognized as cat in Canada but as cot in the Inland North.

== Similar shifts in the United States ==
In the United States, the cot–caught merger is widespread across many regions of the United States, particularly in the Midland and West, but speakers with the merger are often not affected by the shift, possibly due to the fact that the merged vowel is less rounded, less back and slightly lower than the Canadian vowel. This means that there is less space for the retraction of the vowel /æ/, which is a key feature of the Canadian shift. However, there are many regions of the United States where the Canadian shift can be observed, and this is often more closely linked to the raising or retraction of /ɑ/, rather than the actual low back merger.

=== California ===
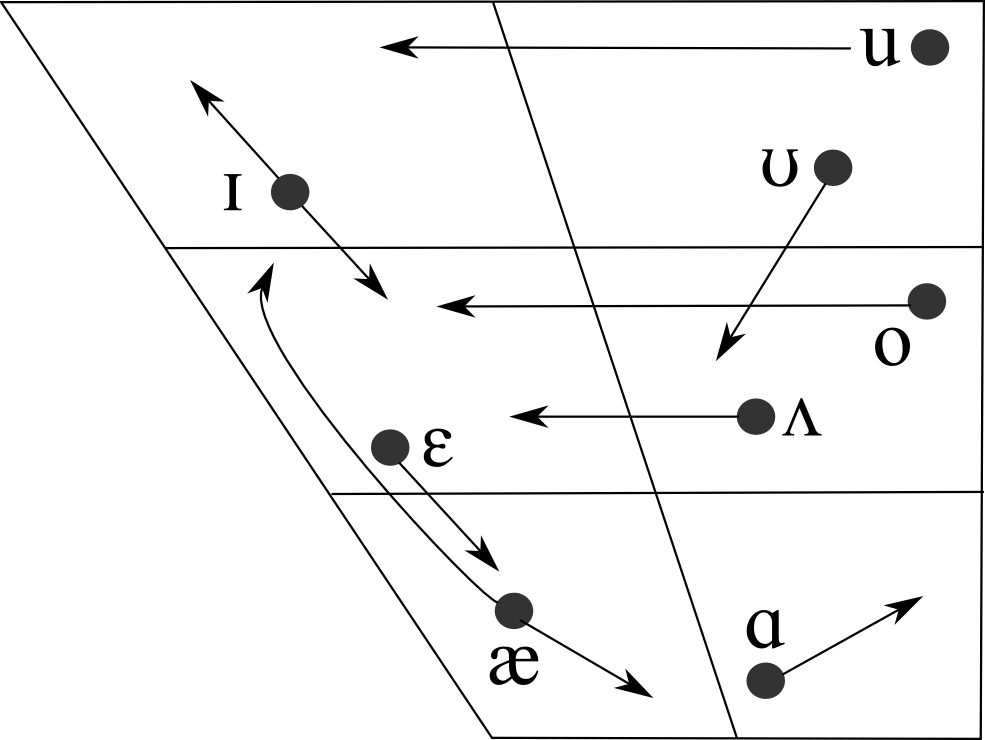
The California vowel shift

The California vowel shift in progress in California English contains features similar to the Canadian Shift, including the lowering/retraction of the front lax vowels. However, the retraction of /æ/ has happened in California even though the Californian /ɑ/ may be more centralized and not as rounded as the Canadian /ɒ/, leading some scholars suggest that the two phenomena are distinct, while others suggest that it was backed "just enough" to allow the shift to happen. Within speakers, the retraction of /æ/ is more correlated with the raising of /ɑ/ than with the low back merger.

=== Other Western states ===
The Atlas of North American English finds that, in the Western United States, one out of every four speakers exhibits the Canadian Shift, as defined quantitatively by Labov et al. based on the formant values for /æ/, /ɑ/, and /ɛ/. More recent data, however, suggests that the shift is widespread among younger speakers throughout the West.

Stanley (2020) found evidence of the shift in Cowlitz County, Washington, where the formant trajectories of /æ/, /ɛ/, and /ɪ/ flattened, causing the onset of /æ/ to lower and slightly retract, the onset of /ɛ/ to lower and retract, and the onset of /ɪ/ to retract. However, the speakers in the study tended to pronounce /ɑ/ and /ɔ/ "close" but distinct, with /ɔ/ being further back and more diphthongal. Furthermore, this state of near merger had persisted for all four generations in the study. An explanation for this is that while the merger itself was not the trigger for the shift, the backing of /ɑ/ leading to the near-merger of /ɑ/ and /ɔ/ was the trigger.

=== U.S. Midland region ===
Durian (2008) found evidence of the Canadian shift in the vowel systems of men born in 1965 and later in Columbus, Ohio. This is located in the U.S. Midland. The Midland dialect is a mix of Northern and Southern dialect features. In Columbus, /ʌ/ is undergoing fronting without lowering, while still remaining distinct from the space occupied by /ɛ/. At the same time, historical /ɒ/ (the vowel in "lot") is merged with the /ɑ/ class, which is raising and backing towards /ɔ/, such that the two are merged or "close". This allows a "free space" for the retraction of /æ/, which is also suggested as a possibility for Western U.S. dialects by Boberg (2005). In Columbus, the Canadian shift closely resembles the version found by Boberg (2005) in Montreal, where /ɑ/ and /ɔ/ are either merged or "close", and /æ/, /ɛ/, and /ɪ/ show retraction of the nucleus without much lowering (with /æ/ also showing "rising diphthong" behavior). However, the retraction of /ɪ/ was not found among all speakers and is more mild among the speakers that do show it than the retraction of /ɛ/ among those speakers. Additionally, the outcome of low back merger-like behavior is more like the California shift outcome noted above than the rounded variant found in most of Canada.

=== Western Pennsylvania ===
In Pittsburgh, another region where the cot–caught merger is prevalent, the mouth vowel, /aʊ/, is usually a monophthong ([äː]) that fills the lower central space, which prevents retracting. However, as /aʊ/ monophthongization declines, some younger speakers are retracting /æ/.

=== Reversal of the Northern cities shift ===
As noted above, the first two stages of the Northern cities shift (NCS) move /æ/ and /ɑ/ in the exact opposite direction of the Canadian shift. However, the NCS is gaining stigma among younger speakers, which can trigger the lowering of /æ/ and the backing of /ɑ/. In fact, Savage et al. (2015) found that, while the raising of /æ/ and fronting of /ɑ/ are stigmatized, the lowering and backing of /ɛ/, a feature of both shifts, is considered prestigious. Nesbitt et al. (2019) say that the Canadian shift may be replacing the NCS.

Jacewicz (2011) found the shift in parts of Wisconsin, where, despite the NCS, /æ/ is lowered and backed, and /ɑ/ raises, and backs, to approach /ɔ/, although, like in Columbus and in Cowlitz County, the merger is not actually complete for most of the speakers in the study, and the lowering of /æ/ is more linked with the raising of /ɑ/. In addition, /ɛ/ is lowered and backed which is in alignment with both the NCS and the Canadian shift.

=== The South ===
Jacewicz (2011) also found evidence for the shift in parts of North Carolina, where the vowels /ɪ/, /ɛ/, and /æ/ lower and monophthongize, undoing the Southern U.S. Shift. /ɑ/ raises, and backs to approach /ɔ/, although the low back merger is not complete for any of the speakers in the study.

In the ANAE, the speech of Atlanta, Georgia, is classified as a typologically Midland dialect because it had already lacked the monopthongization of /aɪ/. However, it appears that the monopthongization of /aɪ/ was a feature of Atlantan speech in the early 20th century, and that much younger speakers have undone the reversal of the front lax and tense vowels that is part of the Southern shift, retracted /ɪ/, /ɛ/, and /æ/, and have a near merger /ɑ/ and /ɔ/.

=== New York City ===
In New York City, there is evidence of the lowering and retraction of /æ/ (except before nasals), /ɛ/, and /ɪ/ particularly among younger non-white speakers. This is despite the fact that Traditional New York City English has an opaque split of the /æ/ phoneme; younger speakers are increasingly lowering /æ/ before voiceless fricatives and voiceless stops and raising it before all nasals. This also correlates with retraction of /ɑ/ and the lowering of /ɔ/, but not necessarily with the low back merger.

== See also ==
- Canadian raising
