= /æ/ raising =

American and Canadian English phonological phenomenon

Examples of /æ/ raising in American English
camp, with and without raising
[kʰɛəmp] with raising,
[kʰæmp] without it

can, with and without raising
[kʰɛən] with raising,
[kʰæn] without it

hang, with and without raising
[heɪŋ] with raising,
[hæŋ] without it

language, with and without raising
[ˈleɪŋɡwɪd͡ʒ] with raising,
[ˈlæŋɡwɪd͡ʒ] without it

thank you, with and without raising
[ˈθeɪŋk ju] with raising,
[ˈθæŋk ju] without it

In the sociolinguistics of the English language, /æ/ raising, or short-a raising, is a phenomenon by which the "short a" vowel /æ/, the trap/bath vowel (found in such words as lack and laugh), is pronounced with a raising of the tongue. In most American and many Canadian English accents, /æ/ raising is specifically /æ/ tensing: a combination of greater raising, fronting, lengthening, and gliding that occurs only in certain phonological environments or certain words. The most common context for tensing /æ/ throughout North American English, regardless of dialect, is when this vowel appears before a nasal consonant (thus, for example, commonly in pan, but rarely in pat).

The realization of this "tense" (as opposed to "lax") /æ/ includes variants such as [ɛə], [eə], [ɛː], etc., which can depend on the particular dialect or even speaker. One common realization is [ɛə], a transcription that will be used throughout this article as a generalized representation of the tensed pronunciation. A similar pronunciation (and variance) occurs in the Mary–marry–merry merger.

Variable raising of /æ/ (and /æɔ/, the MOUTH vowel transcribed with ⟨aʊ⟩ in General American) before nasal consonants also occurs in Australian English.

/æ/ raising in North American English
| Following consonant | Example words | New York City, New Orleans | Baltimore, Philadelphia | Midland US, New England, Pittsburgh, Western US | Canada, Northern Mountain US | Minnesota, Wisconsin | Southern US | Great Lakes US |
|---|---|---|---|---|---|---|---|---|
| Non-prevocalic /m, n/ | fan, lamb, stand | [ɛə] (Note: In New York City and Philadelphia, most function words (am, can, had, etc.) and some learned or less common words (alas, carafe, lad, etc.) have [æ].) (Note: In Philadelphia, the irregular verbs began, ran, and swam have [æ].) | | [ɛə] | [ɛə] | | [ɛə~ɛjə] | [ɛə] |
| Prevocalic /m, n/ | animal, planet, Spanish | [æ] | | [ɛə] | [ɛə] | | [ɛə~ɛjə] | [ɛə] |
| /ŋ/ | frank, language | [æ] | | [ɛː~eɪ~æ] | [ɛː~ɛj] | [eː~ej] | [æ~æɛə] | [ɛə] |
| Prevocalic /ɡ/ | dragon, magazine | [æ] | | [æ] (Note: The untensed /æ/ may be lowered and retracted as much as [ä] in varieties affected by the Low-Back-Merger Shift, mainly predominant in Canada and the American West.) | [ɛː~ɛj] | [eː~ej] | [æ~æɛə] | [ɛə] |
| Non-prevocalic /ɡ/ | bag, drag | [ɛə] | [æ] (Note: In Philadelphia, bad, mad, and glad alone in this context have [ɛə].) | [æ] | [ɛː~ɛj] | [eː~ej] | [æ~æɛə] | [ɛə] |
| Non-prevocalic /b, d, ʃ/ | grab, flash, sad | [ɛə] | [æ] | [æ] | [æ] | [ɛə] | [æ~æɛə] | [ɛə] |
| Non-prevocalic /f, θ, s/ | ask, bath, half, glass | [ɛə] | | [æ] | [æ] | [ɛə] | [æ~æɛə] | [ɛə] |
| Otherwise | as, back, happy, locality | [æ] (Note: In New York City, certain lexical exceptions exist (like avenue being tense) and variability is common before /dʒ/ and /z/ as in imagine, magic, and jazz. In New Orleans, [ɛə] additionally occurs before /v/ and /z/.) | | [æ] | [æ] | [ɛə] | [æ~æɛə] | [ɛə] |

== Distinction between phonemic and non-phonemic /æ/ raising ==
Short-a (or /æ/) tensing can manifest in a variety of possible ways, including "continuous", discrete, and phonemic ("split"). In a continuous system, the phoneme /æ/, as in man, can be pronounced on a continuum from a lax-vowel pronunciation to a tense-vowel pronunciation, depending on the context in which it appears. In a discrete /æ/-tensing system, there is no continuum; any given instance of /æ/ is either tense or lax, with no intermediate realizations. However, in both of these types of system, the degree of raising depends on the context in which the vowel appears, meaning all degrees of tensing are (allophones) of the single "short a" phoneme.

In certain traditional regional dialects of American English, however, including the New York City and Philadelphia ones, using a tense short-a vowel rather than a lax one could actually change the identity of a word, meaning that "short a" sound has been split into two distinct phonemes. For instance, in traditional Philadelphia English, the surname Manning is pronounced with a lax vowel as /ˈmænɪŋ/, whereas the verb manning (as in "He was manning the vehicle") uses the tense vowel as in /ˈmɛənɪŋ/. Therefore, such dialects have a phonemic split of the "short a" vowel, sometimes called a "split short-a system". The relationship between two words (like Manning and manning) that differ in only a single differentiating sound is known as a minimal pair. Here are further examples of minimal pairs of the short a that use the Philadelphia and General American accents for reference as, respectively, phonemic and non-phonemic accents:

| Example words | | Philadelphia | General U.S. |
|---|---|---|---|
| calf e.g. The calf was born today. | caf e.g. Students must eat in the caf. | /kɛəf/ versus /kæf/ | both homophonous as [kʰæf] |
| halve e.g. A knife can halve the bread in two. | have e.g. She might have fun. | /hɛəv/ versus /hæv/ or /(h)əv/ | both potentially homophonous as [hæv] unless 'have' is given a weak form /həv/ or /əv/. |
| manning e.g. He was manning the control panel. | Manning e.g. We met the Manning family. | /ˈmɛənɪŋ/ versus /ˈmænɪŋ/ | both homophonous as [ˈmɛənɪŋ] |
| madder e.g. He's madder than a rabid dog. | matter e.g. Discuss this matter further. | /ˈmɛədər/, [ˈmɛəɾɚ] versus /ˈmætər/, [ˈmæɾɚ] | both homophonous as [ˈmæɾɚ] |
| mass e.g. I grabbed a mass of clay. | Mass e.g. She works at Mass General. | /mɛəs/ versus /mæs/ | both homophonous as [mæs] |
| plan it e.g. We'll plan it after breakfast. | planet e.g. The planet orbits the Sun. | /ˈplɛənət, -ɪt/ versus /ˈplænət/ | both potentially homophonous as [ˈpʰlɛənɨt] unless 'it' is given the strong form /ɪt/ despite being unstressed. |

== Phonemic /æ/ raising systems ==
In a North American short-a phonemic split system (or, simply, a short-a split), the terms "raising" and "tensing" can be used interchangeably. Phonemic tensing occurs in the dialects of New York City and the Mid-Atlantic States (centering on the cities of Philadelphia and Baltimore). John C. Wells has called this BATH raising. It is similar in its word patterns, but not in its resulting pronunciation, to the TRAP–BATH split of certain British English accents, notably London and other Southeast England dialects, which assigns "broad a" of the non-rhotic START class to words that elsewhere retain a "short a" sound. The environment of "broad a" overlaps with that of /æ/ tensing in that it occurs before voiceless fricatives in the same syllable and before nasals in certain environments, and both phenomena involve replacement of the short lax vowel /æ/ with a longer and tenser vowel. However, the "broad a" is lower and backer than [æ], and the result of /æ/ tensing is higher and fronter. In some types of West Country English, the result is a distinct phoneme separate from both /æ/ and /ɑː/.

It is also related to the bad–lad split of Australian English and some Southern British dialects in which a short flat /æ/ is lengthened to [æː] in some conditions. The most significant differences from the Philadelphia system described here are that dialects that split bad–lad have the "broad a" phenomenon, which then prevents the split; 'sad' is long; and lengthening can occur before /ɡ/ and /l/.

=== New York City ===
In the traditional New York accent, the tense /ɛə/ is traditionally an entirely separate phoneme from /æ/ as a result of a phonemic split. The distribution between /æ/ and /ɛə/ is largely predictable. In New York City, tensing occurs uniformly in closed syllables before /n/, /m/, voiceless fricatives (/f θ s ʃ/), and voiced stops (/b g d/). Tensing occurs much more variably before /dʒ/ and /z/, in both closed and open syllables, such as in magic and jazz. In other open syllables, /æ/ tends to stay lax, regardless of the following consonant. (Contrasting that with the distinction between /ɒ/ and /ɔ/, Labov et al. reported that, in New York City, /sæd/ and /sɛəd/ were heard as the same word, but /sɒd/ and /sɔd/ were heard as two different words, suggesting minimal pairs of /æ/ and /ɛə/ to be not as likely in New York City as in Philadelphia.)

Exceptions include the following:

1. Function words with simple codas are usually lax
  can (simple coda) with /æ/ vs. can't (complex coda) with /ɛə/
2. Learned words (often including loanwords) are usually lax
  alas and carafe with /æ/
3. Abbreviated personal names are usually lax
  Cass and Babs with /æ/
4. When a vowel-initial word-level suffix is added to a word with tense /ɛə/, the vowel remains tense even though it now stands in an open syllable
  mannish has /ɛə/ like man, not /æ/ like manage
  classy has /ɛə/ like class, not /æ/ like classic
  passing has /ɛə/ like pass, not /æ/ like Pasadena
5. Words with initial /æ/ are usually lax, except for the most common words
  aspirin and asterisk with /æ/ vs. ask and after (more common words) with /ɛə/
6. Certain one-off exceptions (The word avenue usually has tense /ɛə/, unlike any other case of /æ/ before /v/. The word family is quite variable.)

The New York City split system has also diffused, often with slightly different conditioning, into Albany, Cincinnati, New Orleans, and nearby parts of New Jersey.

=== Northern New Jersey ===
In Northern New Jersey, Labov finds the New York City split system, though with some variability. East of the Hackensack River—by Hoboken, Weehawken, and Jersey City—and also in Newark, Labov finds the split to occur with no more variation than in New York City itself.

Between the Hackensack and Passaic Rivers, Labov finds that speakers typically lose the city's function word constraint before nasal consonants. Thus, am, can (the verb), an, and and all typically take on tense /ɛə/, while had ordinarily retains lax /æ/. Labov also reports variable tensing in open syllables, resulting in potential tensing of words like planet and fashionable.

West of the Passaic River, /æ/ tensing only occurs before nasal consonants.

=== Albany ===
Like in Northern New Jersey, Labov finds that the New York split system has also diffused in Albany with some alterations. Although the function is lost in Northern New Jersey, Labov reports that the function constraint is weakened only in Albany. Thus, can, an, and has may be tensed while have and had may be lax. Also, the open syllable constraint is variable in Northern New Jersey, but Labov reports that in Albany, that constraint is absent altogether. Thus, national, cashew, family, camera, planet, and manner are all tense.

=== Older Cincinnati ===
Labov finds the remnants of the New York split system present in the now-declining traditional dialect of Cincinnati, with variations similar to those of Northern New Jersey and Albany. Like in Albany, the open-syllable constraint is completely absent. However, the function word and is reported as being lax.

Labov further reports consistently laxing before /g/. In New York, tensing before voiced fricatives is variable, but it is reported as consistent in Cincinnati.

=== New Orleans ===
Labov finds the New York split system in New Orleans with similar variations. As in older Cincinnati, tensing may also occur before voiced fricatives. As in Northern New Jersey, the function constraint is virtually absent. However, closer to the split of New York City proper, the open syllable constraint is still retained. Also, the tense variant [ɛə] appears to always be present before voiced fricatives like /v/ and /z/.

=== Philadelphia and Baltimore ===
Philadelphia and Baltimore use a different short-a system than New York City, but it is similar in that it is also a split system. Tensing does not occur before voiced stops and /ʃ/, with the only exceptions being mad, bad, and glad. Here are further examples that are true for Philadelphia and Baltimore, as well as for New York City:

| Tense /ɛə/ | | Lax /æ/ | |
|---|---|---|---|
| man | /mɛən/ | hang | /hæŋ/ |
| ham | /hɛəm/ | pal | /pæl/ |
| laugh | /lɛəf/ | lap | /læp/ |
| bath | /bɛəθ/ | bat | /bæt/ |
| pass | /pɛəs/ | passage | /ˈpæsɪdʒ/ |

Philadelphia/Baltimore exceptions include the New York exceptions listed above, as well as the following:

1. When a polysyllabic word with /æ/ in an open syllable gets truncated to a single closed syllable, the vowel remains lax:
  caf (truncation of cafeteria) has /æ/, not /ɛə/ like calf
  path (truncation of pathology) has /æ/, not /ɛə/ like path 'way, road'
  Mass (truncation of Massachusetts) has /æ/, not /ɛə/ like mass
2. Function words and irregular verb tenses have lax /æ/, even in an environment which would usually cause tensing:
  and (a function word) has /æ/, not /ɛə/ like sand
  ran (a strong verb tense) has /æ/, not /ɛə/ like man

== Non-phonemic /æ/ raising systems ==
=== Before nasals ===
Most American and many Canadian English speakers, at the very least, display an /æ/ that is raised (tensed) and diphthongized before the front nasals /m/ and /n/, such as in camp, man, ram, pan, ran, clamber, Sammy, which are otherwise lower and laxer. However, they fail to split the "short a" into two contrasting phonemes, which the New York, Baltimore, Philadelphia, and Yat accents do. A common form is what William Labov calls the "nasal system" in which /æ/ is raised and tensed most severely but not necessarily exclusively before nasal consonants, regardless of whether there is a syllabic or morphemic boundary present. The nasal system is found in several separate and unrelated dialect regions, including the southern Midwest, Northern New Jersey, Florida, and parts of Canada, but it is most prominent, the difference between the two allophones of /æ/ being the greatest and speakers with the nasal system being most concentrated, in eastern New England, including in Boston.

More widespread among speakers of the Western United States, Canada, and the southern Midwest is a "continuous system", which also revolves around "short a" before nasal consonants but has a less-extreme raising of the tongue than the "nasal system". Most varieties of General American English fall under that category. The system resembles the nasal system in that /æ/ is usually raised and tensed to [ɛə] before nasals, but instead of a sharp divide between a high, tense allophone before nasals and a low, lax one before other consonants, allophones of /æ/ occupy a continuum of varying degrees of height and tenseness between both extremes, with a variety of phonetic and phonological factors interacting (sometimes differently in different dialects) to determine the height and tenseness of any particular example of /æ/.

The pattern most characteristic of Southern American English does not use /æ/ raising at all but uses what has been called the "Southern drawl" instead, with /æ/ becoming in essence a triphthong [æjə]. However, many speakers from the South still use the nasal /æ/-raising system described above, particularly in Charleston, Atlanta, and Florida. Also, some speakers from the New Orleans area have been reported to have a system that is very similar to the phonemic split of New York.

=== Before /ɡ, ŋ/ ===
For speakers in much of Canada and in the North-Central and the Northwestern United States, a following /ɡ/ (as in magazine, rag, bags, etc.) or /ŋ/ (as in bang, pang, gangster, angler, etc.) tenses an /æ/ as much as or more than a following nasal does. In Wisconsin, Minnesota, and Central Canada, a merger of /æ/ with /eɪ/ before /ɡ/ has been reported, making, for example, haggle and Hegel homophones.

=== General /æ/ raising ===
In accents that have undergone the Northern Cities Vowel Shift, mostly those of the Inland Northern United States, the phoneme /æ/ is raised and diphthongized in all possible environments: a "general raising" system. The Inland North dialect is spoken in such cities as Chicago, Milwaukee, Detroit, Cleveland, Buffalo, Rochester, and Syracuse. However, a reversal of the raising (except before nasal consonants) has been observed in at least some of the communities in which it has been documented, including Syracuse and Lansing, Michigan.

== Australian English ==
In Australian English, /æ/ and the backing diphthong /æɔ/ (which corresponds to /aʊ/ in General American and RP) may be raised to [ɛː, ɛɔ] before nasal consonants. In the case of /æ/, the raised allophone approaches the DRESS vowel /e/ but is typically somewhat longer, similar to the SQUARE vowel /eː/. In the case of /æɔ/, it is only the first element that is variably raised, the second element remains unchanged.

For some speakers this raising is substantial, yet for others it is nonexistent.

Vowel length has become the main perceptual difference between /æ/ and /e/ when before /n/ or /m/. For example, a word like 'Ben' would be pronounced [ben], while 'ban' would be pronounced [beːn].

== See also ==
- Canadian raising, raising of the diphthongs /aɪ/ and /aʊ/ in many North American English varieties

== Sources ==
- Baker, Adam; Mielke, Jeff; Archangeli, Diana (2008). "More velar than /g/: Consonant Coarticulation as a Cause of Diphthongization" (PDF). In Chang, Charles B.; Haynie, Hannah J. (eds.). Proceedings of the 26th West Coast Conference on Formal Linguistics. Somerville, Massachusetts: Cascadilla Proceedings Project. pp. 60–68. ISBN 978-1-57473-423-2.
- Boberg, Charles (2008). "Regional phonetic differentiation in Standard Canadian English". Journal of English Linguistics. 36 (2): 129–154. doi:10.1177/0075424208316648. S2CID 146478485.
- Duncan, Daniel (2016). ""Tense" /æ/ is still lax: A phonotactics study". In Hansson, Gunnar Ólafur; Farris-Trimble, Ashley; McMullin, Kevin; Pulleyblank, Douglas (eds.). Supplemental Proceedings of the 2015 Annual Meeting on Phonology. Proceedings of the Annual Meetings on Phonology. Vol. 3. Washington, D.C.: Linguistic Society of America. doi:10.3765/amp.v3i0.3653.
- Labov, William (2007). "Transmission and Diffusion" (PDF). Language. 83 (2): 344–387. doi:10.1353/lan.2007.0082. JSTOR 40070845. S2CID 6255506.
- Labov, William; Ash, Sharon; Boberg, Charles (2006). The Atlas of North American English. Berlin: Mouton de Gruyter. ISBN 3-11-016746-8.
- Mielke, Jeff; Carignan, Christopher; Thomas, Erik R. (2017). "The articulatory dynamics of pre-velar and pre-nasal /æ/-raising in English: An ultrasound study" (PDF). The Journal of the Acoustical Society of America. 142 (1): 332–349. Bibcode:2017ASAJ..142..332M. doi:10.1121/1.4991348. PMID 28764450.
