= Drawl =

Perceived longer vowel sounds and diphthongs in speech

A drawl is a perceived feature of some varieties of spoken English and generally indicates slower, longer vowel sounds and diphthongs. The drawl is often perceived as a method of speaking more slowly and may be erroneously attributed to laziness or fatigue. That particular speech pattern exists primarily in varieties of English, the most noticeable of which are Southern American English, Broad Australian English, Broad New Zealand English, and East Midlands English. The word drawl is believed to have its origin in the 1590-1600s Dutch or Low German word dralen [ˈdraːlə(n)], meaning 'to linger'.

The most commonly-recognized Southern Drawl features the diphthongization or triphthongization of the traditional short front vowels, as in the words pat, pet, and pit, especially at the end of sentences. They develop a glide up from their original starting position to [j] and, in some cases, back down to schwa.

== Southern drawl ==
The Southern drawl is a common name for, broadly, the Southern accent of the United States or, narrowly, a particular feature of the accent: the historical front pure vowels of English articulated with lengthening and breaking (diphthongization or even triphthongization), perhaps also co-occurring with a marked change in pitch. Across a sentence, this phenomenon results in the "prolongation of the most heavily stressed syllables, with the corresponding weakening of the less stressed ones, so that there is an illusion of slowness even though the tempo may be fast."

=== Characteristics ===
The major characteristic of the Southern drawl is vowel breaking: the shifting of a monophthong into a diphthong or even a triphthong. In the Southern accent, the short front vowels /æ/, /ɛ/, and /ɪ/ may be somewhat raised (or become an up-gliding diphthong, or both) before finally centralizing towards a schwa-like off-glide [ə]. See the examples below:

/æ/ → [æ(i)ə)]; thus sat [sæt] can become [sæi̯ət]
/ɛ/ → [ɛ(i)ə)]; thus set [sɛt] can become [sɛi̯ət]
/ɪ/ → [ɪ(i)ə)]; thus sit [sɪt] can become [sɪi̯ət]

=== History and social perceptions ===
Drawling was established in older Southern American English, surviving into 20th-century Southern American English, though declining in speakers born since 1960.

The drawl is often associated with social stereotypes, positive and negative. Studies have shown that American adults tend to attribute Southern accents with friendliness and humility. However, the drawl is also perceived as slow and (mistakenly) attributed to the hot Southern climate or the laziness of its speakers.

== Broad Australian ==
Broad Australian likely emerged from New South Wales, in southeastern Australia, in the early 1800s, when the population was significantly increasing by the importation of convicts, many of whom came from Britain and Ireland. The area was relatively isolated from outside influences, which fostered the growth of a new dialect. In the late 1800s, people from New South Wales began to move to other parts of the continent because of increased overseas immigration, gold rushes, and other factors.

=== Vowel changes ===
- /oʊ/ has a lowered first target and a lowered and fronted second target
- /u/ is lowered
- /i/ significant onglide – The degree of this onglide is affected by age and is less marked by younger speakers than older speakers
- /ɜ/ is fronted
- /aʊ/ has a fronted and raised first target
- /eɪ/ has a retracted first target
- /aɪ/ has a retracted and raised first target
- /ɪə/ has a diminished offglide
- /ɛə/ has a diminished offglide

The "cavalry drawl" was a phenomenon of English-speaking officers in England, which was noted around 1840. Officers in certain cavalry regiments considered to be fashionable would affect a drawling delivery in their speech.

== Broad New Zealand ==
Broad New Zealand, much like Broad Australian, began taking hold in the late 1800s when people from the British Isles brought their varieties of English to New Zealand. Its drawl in is caused by vowel shifts and diphthongization.
