= Northern accent =

A northern accent, in general, is an accent characteristic of the northern part of any country or region. With reference to the English language, the term usually refers to either of:

- United States:
  - Midwestern General American
  - North-Central American English
  - Northern American English
    - Inland Northern American English
  - Western American English
- United Kingdom:
  - Northern England English
