= Midwestern American English =

Midwestern or Upper Northern dialects or accents of American English are any of those associated with the Midwestern region of the United States, and they include:

- General American English, the most widely perceived "mainstream" American English accent, sometimes considered "Midwestern" in character, particularly prior to the Northern Cities Vowel Shift.
- Inland Northern American English, spoken in cities like Chicago, Detroit, Milwaukee, and Cleveland as well as in Western and Central New York State (Buffalo, Rochester, Syracuse, etc.).
- Midland American English, spoken in cities like Columbus, Indianapolis, and Kansas City.
- North-Central American English, spoken in areas like Minnesota, northern Wisconsin, northern Iowa, and the Dakotas.
