= Western New England English =

Varieties of American English

Western New England English refers to the varieties of New England English native to Vermont, Connecticut, and the western half of Massachusetts; New York State's Hudson Valley (from Albany to Poughkeepsie) also aligns to this classification. Sound patterns historically associated with Western New England English include the features of rhoticity (full pronunciation of all r sounds), the horse–hoarse merger, and the father–bother merger, none of which are features traditionally shared in neighboring Eastern New England English. The status of the cot–caught merger in Western New England is inconsistent, being complete in the north of this dialect region (Vermont), but incomplete or absent in the south (southern Connecticut), with a "cot–caught approximation" in the middle area (primarily, western Massachusetts).

Western New England English is relatively difficult for most American laypersons and even dialectologists to identify by any "distinct" accent when compared to its popularly recognized neighbors (Eastern New England English, New York City English, and Inland Northern U.S. English), meaning that its accents are typically perceived as unmarked "General American" varieties. Linguistic research, however, reveals that Western New England English is not simply one single or uniform dialect. Linguist Charles Boberg proposes that it be most generally divided into a Northwestern New England English (a standalone "Vermont" accent) and a Southwestern New England English (a less advanced subdialect of Inland Northern English); however, even Boberg lists the possibilities of several distinct accent divisions of Western New England.

== Vocabulary ==
Vocabulary features that predominate in Western New England English include grinder for sub (submarine sandwich), and tag sale for garage sale (predominant in Connecticut and Western Massachusetts).

== Overview of phonology ==
Some Western New England speakers show the "generating conditions" for the Northern Cities Vowel Shift (or NCVS: the defining feature of the Great Lakes region's modern dialect) in backing of /ɛ/ (to [ɛ~ɜ]), possible fronting of /ɑ/ to [ɑ̈], and tensing all instances of /æ/ to something like [ɛə]. Though actually variable, these features occur among Western New England speakers just enough to suggest that they may be the "pivot conditions" that influenced the NCVS in the Inland North, likely beginning in the early twentieth century.

The English of Western New England in fact shows many sharp differences throughout rather than one uniform accent. In 2001, Charles Boberg, discussing that Western New England English was a likely direct influence on the Inland Northern English of the Great Lakes region, still identified as many as four or five English sub-regional accents within Western New England itself, based on data from the late 1990s:

- Northwestern Vermont (centered on Burlington) shows no raising of /æ/ (except before nasal consonants), and therefore /ɑ/ stays back in the mouth, leading to a cot–caught merger to [ɑ]; this whole process consistently follows the logic of the Canadian Shift of Standard Canadian English.
- Southwestern Vermont (centered on Rutland) shows a universal /æ/ raising to [ɛə] and /ɑ/ fronting to [ɑ̈], but then oversteps and defies the logical direction of the Northern Cities Vowel Shift by producing a cot–caught merger to [ɑ̈].
- Western Massachusetts (centered on Springfield) shows a universal /æ/ raising to [ɛə] and /ɑ/ fronting to [ɑ̈], following the logic of the Northern Cities Vowel Shift, except that it tends towards a cot–caught merger to [ɑ], which is especially completed among younger speakers.
- Central Connecticut (centered on Hartford) shows a universal /æ/ raising to [ɛə] and /ɑ/ fronting to [ɑ̈], and thus avoiding the cot–caught merger; this whole process consistently follows the logic of the Northern Cities Vowel Shift.
- Coastal Connecticut (centered on New Haven), in the above respects, appears to have more in common with New York City English, including a clear absence of the cot–caught merger.

Charles Boberg argues that Northwestern New England (Vermont) English, due to its cot–caught merger but failure to demonstrate other features of the Eastern New England dialect, must be considered as its own separate dialect. On the other hand, in discussing Southwestern New England English as its own unique dialect, he instead proposed that it be regarded as a "subtype" of the Inland North dialect, based on the aforementioned commonalities, even if variable, such as the universal raising of the short a and no cot–caught merger. However, some younger Southwestern New England speakers have diverged away from both of these features, which Boberg at least partly foresaw; such variables are discussed in greater detail below.

== Northwestern New England English ==
Northwestern New England English, sometimes labeled as a Vermont accent, is the most complete or advanced Western New England English variety in terms of the cot–caught merger, occurring largely everywhere north of Northampton, Massachusetts, towards [ɑ]. Today, speakers documented in Burlington (northwestern Vermont) and Rutland (southwestern Vermont) show consistent fronting of /ɑ/ before /r/, therefore towards [ɑ̈~a], in words like car or barn. The first element of /oʊ/ (e.g. in "goat") is similar to [o̞ʊ~ɔʊ] with a low and lax first element, and sometimes with no glide as monophthongal [o̞].

=== Burlington ===
Northwestern Vermont (centered on Burlington) shows no raising of /æ/ (except before nasal consonants), and therefore /ɑ/ stays back in the mouth, leading to a cot–caught merger to [ɑ]; this whole process follows the logic of the Canadian Shift of Standard Canadian English.

=== Rural Vermont ===
Since the mid-twentieth century, Vermont speakers have largely avoided stigmatized local features, and now follow the rhotic r of the rest of Western New England. However, before this time, the eastern edge of Vermont spoke Eastern New England English, even dropping the r sound everywhere except before vowels, just like in traditional Boston or Maine accents. These speakers may retain vestigial elements of Eastern New England's trap-bath split, backing and lowering /æ/ in certain environments. Today, a dwindling, generally rural, older, and male segment of the northern Vermont population, best studied in the Northeast Kingdom, uniquely pronounces /aʊ/ with a raised starting point as [ɛʊ] (e.g. in "cows";) and /aɪ/ (e.g. in "lie") with a backer, raised, or somewhat more rounded starting point as [ɒɪ~əɪ]. A deep retroflex approximant for "r" may be noted among rural northern speakers, perhaps inherited from West Country or Scots-Irish ancestors, due to such immigrants largely settling in western New England (though not as much in eastern New England). One notable lifelong native speaker of the rural Vermont accent was Fred Tuttle.

=== Rutland ===
Southwestern Vermont (centered on Rutland) shows a universal /æ/ raising to [ɛə] and /ɑ/ fronting to [ɑ̈], but then oversteps and defies the logical direction of the Northern Cities Vowel Shift by producing a cot–caught merger to [ɑ̈]. The universal /æ/ raising is most consistently recorded in speakers born before 1950; those born since 1960 show somewhat less raising.

== Southwestern New England English ==
Southwestern New England English is centered primarily around Hartford, CT and Springfield, MA. Its older speakers show more instances of universal tensing of the short a /æ/, while younger speakers show the more General American feature of tensing this vowel only before nasal consonants. The Atlas of North American English confirms that this raising phenomenon is highly variable in the region, though studies agree that raising always occurs strongest before nasal consonants.

Regarding the cot–caught merger, Southwestern New England speech has historically lacked the merger, before entering a transitional state of the merger in the mid-1900s. A "cot–caught approximation" now prevails especially in Springfield and western Massachusetts, but is variable from one speaker to the next with no apparent age-based correlation, except that the youngest speakers now are tending to demonstrate a full merger. Local, especially working-class speakers of southwestern Connecticut (especially Greater Bridgeport and New Haven) and the Albany area of New York State, strongly influenced by nearby New York City dialect, continue to resist the cot–caught merger.

=== Hudson Valley ===
Though not belonging geographically to New England, New York State's Hudson Valley speaks a sub-type of Southwestern New England English (best studied in Albany, New York), demonstrating additional influence from New York City English. Albany English shows Southwestern New England English's slight backing of /ɛ/ (to [ɛ~ɜ]) and possible fronting of /ɑ/ to [ɑ̈], but New York City's caught vowel [ɔə] and, though having a continuous short-a system, still shows influence from New York City's short-a split system. Also, Albany starts /aɪ/ fairly back [ɑɪ~äɪ] and /aʊ/ somewhat forward in the mouth [aʊ].
