= Southern American English =

Varieties of English spoken in the Southern United States

- Southern U.S. English
- Region: Southern United States
- Language family: Indo-European: Germanic; West Germanic; Ingvaeonic; Anglo–Frisian; Anglic; English; North American English; American English; Southern American English
- Early forms: Old English: Middle English; Early Modern English; Older Southern American English, Appalachian English
- Writing system: Latin (English alphabet)

Language codes
- ISO 639-3: –
- Glottolog: sout3302

Southern American English or Southern U.S. English is a regional dialect or collection of dialects of American English spoken throughout the Southern United States, primarily by white Southerners and increasingly concentrated in more rural areas. Research from the turn of the 21st century reveals its most innovative features exist in southern Appalachian and certain Texan accents. Such research has described Southern American English as the largest American regional accent group by number of speakers. More formal terms used within American linguistics include Southern White Vernacular English and Rural White Southern English. However, more commonly in the United States, the variety is recognized as a Southern accent, which technically refers merely to the dialect's sound system, often also called a Southern twang, or simply Southern.

== History ==
A diversity of earlier Southern dialects once existed: a consequence of the mix of English speakers from the British Isles (including largely English and Scots-Irish immigrants) who migrated to the American South in the 17th and 18th centuries, with particular 19th-century elements also borrowed from the London upper class and enslaved African-Americans. By the 19th century, this included distinct dialects in eastern Virginia, the greater Lowcountry area surrounding Charleston, the Appalachian upcountry region, the Black Belt plantation region, and secluded Atlantic coastal and island communities.

Following the American Civil War, as the South's economy and migration patterns fundamentally transformed, so did Southern dialect trends. Over the next few decades, Southerners moved increasingly to Appalachian mill towns, to Texan farms, or out of the South entirely. The main result, further intensified by later upheavals such as the Great Depression, the Dust Bowl and perhaps World War II, is that a newer and more unified form of Southern American English consolidated, beginning around the last quarter of the 19th century, radiating outward from Texas and Appalachia through all the traditional Southern States until around World War II. This newer Southern dialect largely superseded the older and more diverse local Southern dialects, though it became quickly stigmatized in American popular culture. As a result, since around the 1950s and 1960s, the notable features of this newer Southern accent have been in a gradual decline, particularly among younger and more urban Southerners, though less so among rural white Southerners.

== Geography ==
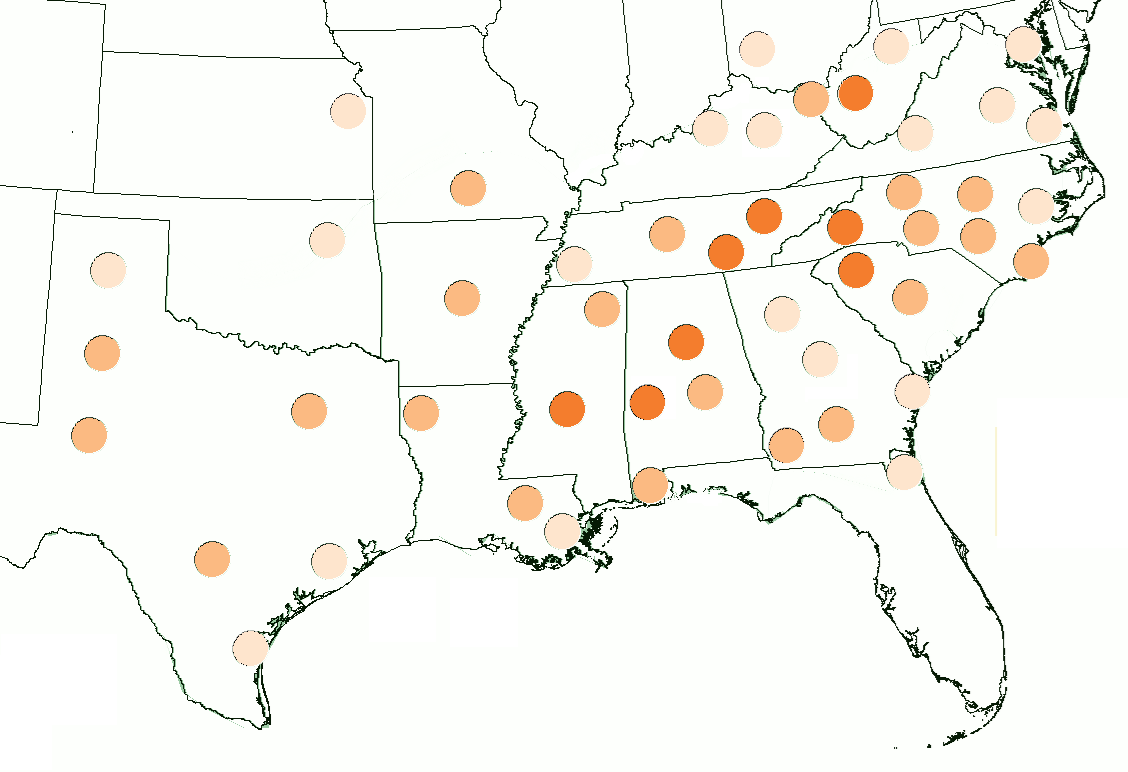
The approximate extent of Southern American English in major cities, based upon the 2006 Atlas of North American English. The darkest color indicates cities with the highest degree of Southern accent features, the medium color those with a middling degree, and the lightest those with a low degree.

Despite the slow decline of the modern Southern accent, it is still documented as widespread as of the 2006 Atlas of North American English. Specifically, the Atlas documents a Southern accent in urban areas of Virginia, North Carolina, South Carolina, Georgia, Alabama, Mississippi, Tennessee, Kentucky, Arkansas, Louisiana (alongside Cajun and New Orleans accents), and West Virginia; many areas of Texas; the Jacksonville area of northern Florida; the Springfield area of southern Missouri; and in some urban speakers in eastern Kansas, southern Ohio, and the Tulsa area of Oklahoma. (Note: The Atlas (p. 127) notes that "Southeastern Ohio is well known to show strong Southern influence in speech patterns". However, some maps in the Atlas do not formally document such speech patterns due to the region having no urban areas populated enough to be considered.) Although the Atlas is a nationwide study that focuses on urban areas, the Southern accent has been increasingly becoming concentrated, for decades, in rural areas, which are often less well-studied. Other 21st-century scholarship further includes within this dialect region southern Maryland, eastern and southern Oklahoma, the rest of northern and central Florida and southern Missouri, and southeastern New Mexico.

Furthermore, the Atlas documents (South) Midland accents of the U.S. as sharing key features with Southern accents, like GOAT fronting and resistance to the cot-caught merger, while lacking other defining features like the Southern Vowel Shift. Such shared features extend across all of Texas and Oklahoma, as well as eastern and central Kansas, southern Missouri, southern Indiana, southern Ohio, and southern Illinois.

Finally, African-American accents across the United States have many common points with Southern accents due to the strong historical ties of African Americans to the South.

=== Exceptions ===
The Atlas notably identifies several culturally Southern cities in particular as lacking a Southern accent, either having shifted away from it or having never had it to begin with, such as Norfolk and Richmond, Virginia; Raleigh and Greenville, North Carolina; Charleston, South Carolina; Atlanta and possibly Savannah, Georgia; Abilene, El Paso, Austin, and possibly Corpus Christi, Texas; and Oklahoma City. Some cities are home to both the Southern accent and other more locally distinct accents—most clearly New Orleans, Louisiana.

== Phonology ==
The Southern regional accent, existing since the late 19th century and more widely since 20th century until the present, diverges from General American accents in several ways. One defining feature is the diphthong /aɪ/ in prize, lime, fly, etc. losing its gliding quality and becoming [aː] in many or all environments, so for example the word ride commonly approaches a sound that most other English speakers would hear as rod or rad. Southern drawling (or diphthongizing) of the short front vowels, particularly when in a strongly emphasized word, causes pet and pit, for instance, to sound to other English speakers more like pay-it and pee-it. All of this appears to be related to a complicated chain shift of vowels that define the accent.

Fronting is common for the back vowels in GOAT, GOOSE, STRUT, and FOOT, and in the first element of the diphthong MOUTH. The pin-pen merger is also widespread. Rhoticity, the pronunciation of all historical /r/ sounds, is the norm, as in General American accents. In fact, Southern accents often have a strongly articulated bunched-tongue /r/ sound. However, some sub-regional accents used primarily by Southerners born in the mid-20th century and earlier, as well as black Southern accents, may be largely non-rhotic, dropping the /r/ in environments other than before a vowel sound.

In Louisiana, the accent coexists alongside distinct New Orleans and Cajun accents. Various sub-regional Southern accents exist, with the strongest vowel features documented in Appalachian English and certain accents of Texan English.

== Grammar ==
These grammatical features are characteristic of both older and newer Southern American English.

- Use of done as an auxiliary verb between the subject and verb in sentences conveying the past tense.
  I done told you before.
- Use of done (instead of did) as the past simple form of do, and similar uses of the past participle in place of the past simple, such as seen replacing saw as past simple form of see.
  I only done what you done told me.
  I seen her first.
- Use of other non-standard preterites, such as drownded as the past tense of drown, knowed as the past tense of know, choosed as the past tense of choose, degradated as the past tense of degrade.
  I knowed you for a fool soon as I seen you.
- Use of been instead of have been in perfect constructions.
  I been livin' here darn near my whole life.
- Use of (a-) fixin' to, with several spelling variants such as fixing to or fixinta, to indicate immediate future action; in other words: intending to, preparing to, or about to.
  He's fixin' to eat.
  They're fixing to go for a hike.

It is not clear where the term comes from and when it was first used. According to dialect dictionaries, fixin' to is associated with Southern speech, most often defined as being a synonym of preparing to or intending to. Some linguists, e.g. Marvin K. Ching, regard it as being a quasimodal rather than a verb followed by an infinitive. It is a term used by all social groups, although more frequently by people with a lower social status than by members of the educated upper classes. Furthermore, it is more common in the speech of younger people than in that of older people. Like much of the Southern dialect, the term is also more prevalent in rural areas than in urban areas.

- Preservation of older English me, him, etc. as reflexive datives.
  I'm fixin' to paint me a picture.
  He's gonna catch him a big one.
- Saying this here in place of this or this one, and that there in place of that or that one.
  This here's mine and that there is yours.
- Existential it, a feature dating from Middle English which can be explained as by substituting it for there when there refers to no physical location, but only to the existence of something.
  It's one lady who lives in town.
  It is nothing more to say.

Standard English would prefer "existential there", as in "There's one lady who lives in town". This construction is used to say that something exists (rather than saying where it is located). The construction can be found in Middle English as in Marlowe's Edward II: "Cousin, it is no dealing with him now".

- Use of ever in place of every.
  Ever'where's the same these days.
- Using liketa (sometimes spelled as liked to or like to) to mean "almost".
  I liketa died.
  He liketa got hit by a car.

Liketa is presumably a conjunction of "like to" or "like to have" coming from Appalachian English. It is most often seen as a synonym for almost. Accordingly, the phrase I like't'a died would be I almost died in Standard English. With this meaning, liketa can be seen as a verb modifier for actions that are on the verge of happening. Furthermore, it is more often used in an exaggerated or violent figurative sense rather than a literal sense.

- Use of the distal demonstrative "yonder," archaic in most dialects of English, to indicate a third, larger degree of distance beyond both "here" and "there" (thus relegating "there" to a medial demonstrative as in some other languages), indicating that something is a longer way away, and to a lesser extent, in a wide or loosely defined expanse, as in the church hymn "When the Roll Is Called Up Yonder". A typical example is the use of "over yonder" in place of "over there" or "in or at that indicated place", especially to refer to a particularly different spot, such as in "the house over yonder".
- Compared to General American English, when contracting a negated auxiliary verb, Southern American English has an increased preference for contracting the subject and the auxiliary than the auxiliary and "not", e.g. the first of the following pairs:
  He's not here. / He isn't here.
  I've not been there. / I haven't been there.

=== Multiple modals ===
Standard English has a strict word order. In the case of modal auxiliaries, standard English is restricted to a single modal per verb phrase. However, some Southern speakers use double or more modals in a row (might could, might should, might would, used to could, etc.--also called "modal stacking") and sometimes even triple modals that involve oughta (like might should oughta)

- I might could climb to the top.
- I used to could do that.

The origin of multiple modals is controversial; some say it is a development of Modern English, while others trace them back to Middle English and others to Scots-Irish settlers. There are different opinions on which class preferably uses the term. Atwood (1953) for example, finds that educated people try to avoid multiple modals, whereas Montgomery (1998) suggests the opposite. In some Southern regions, multiple modals are quite widespread and not particularly stigmatized. Possible multiple modals are:

may could	might could	might supposed to
may can	might oughta	mighta used to
may will	might can	might woulda had oughta
may should	might should	oughta could
may supposed to	might would	better can
may need to	might better	should oughta
may used to	might had better	used to could
	can might	musta coulda
	could might	would better

As the table shows, there are only possible combinations of an epistemic modal followed by deontic modals in multiple modal constructions. Deontic modals express permissibility with a range from obligated to forbidden and are mostly used as markers of politeness in requests whereas epistemic modals refer to probabilities from certain to impossible. Multiple modals combine these two modalities.

=== Conditional syntax and evidentiality ===
People from the South often make use of conditional or evidential syntaxes as shown below (italicized in the examples):

Conditional syntax in requests:

I guess you could step out and git some toothpicks and a carton of Camel cigarettes if you a mind to.
If you be good enough to take it, I believe I could stand me a taste.

Conditional syntax in suggestions:

I wouldn't look for 'em to show up if I was you.
I'd think that whiskey would be a trifle hot.

Conditional syntax creates a distance between the speaker's claim and the hearer. It serves to soften obligations or suggestions, make criticisms less personal, and to overall express politeness, respect, or courtesy.

Southerners also often use "evidential" predicates such as think, reckon, believe, guess, have the feeling, etc.:

You already said that once, I believe.
I wouldn't want to guess, but I have the feeling we'll know soon enough.
You reckon we oughta get help?
I don't believe I've ever known one.

Evidential predicates indicate an uncertainty of the knowledge asserted in the sentence. According to Johnston (2003), evidential predicates nearly always hedge the assertions and allow the respondents to hedge theirs. They protect speakers from the social embarrassment that appears, in case the assertion turns out to be wrong. As is the case with conditional syntax, evidential predicates can also be used to soften criticisms and to afford courtesy or respect.

== Vocabulary ==
In the United States, the following vocabulary is mostly unique to, or best associated with, Southern U.S. English:

- Ain't to mean am not, is not, are not, have not, has not, etc.
- Bless your heart to express sympathy or concern to the addressee; often, now used sarcastically
- Buggy to mean shopping cart
- Carry to additionally mean escort or accompany
- Catty-corner to mean located or placed diagonally
- Chill bumps as a synonym for goose bumps
- Coke to mean any sweet, carbonated soft drink
- Crawfish to mean crayfish
- Cut on/off/out to mean turn on/off/out (lights or electronics)
- Devil's beating his wife as a phrase used during a sunshower
- Icing preferred over frosting in the confectionary sense
- Liketa to mean almost or nearly (in Alabama and Appalachian English)
- Ordinary to mean disreputable
- Ornery to mean bad-tempered or surly (derived from ordinary)
- Powerful to mean great in number or amount (used as an adverb)
- Right to mean very or extremely (used as an adverb)
- Reckon to mean think, guess, or conclude
- Rolling to mean the prank of toilet papering
- Slaw as a synonym for coleslaw
- Taters to mean potatoes
- Toboggan to mean knit cap
- Tote to mean carry
- Tump to mean tip or turn over as an intransitive verb (in the western South, including Texas and Louisiana)
- Ugly to mean rude
- Varmint to mean vermin or an undesirable animal or person
- Veranda to mean large, roofed porch
- Yonder to mean (far) over there

Unique words can occur as Southern nonstandard past-tense forms of verbs, particularly in the Southern highlands and Piney Woods, as in yesterday they riz up, come outside, drawed, and drownded, as well as participle forms like they have took it, rode it, blowed it up, and swimmed away. Drug is traditionally both the past tense and participle form of the verb drag.

=== Y'all ===
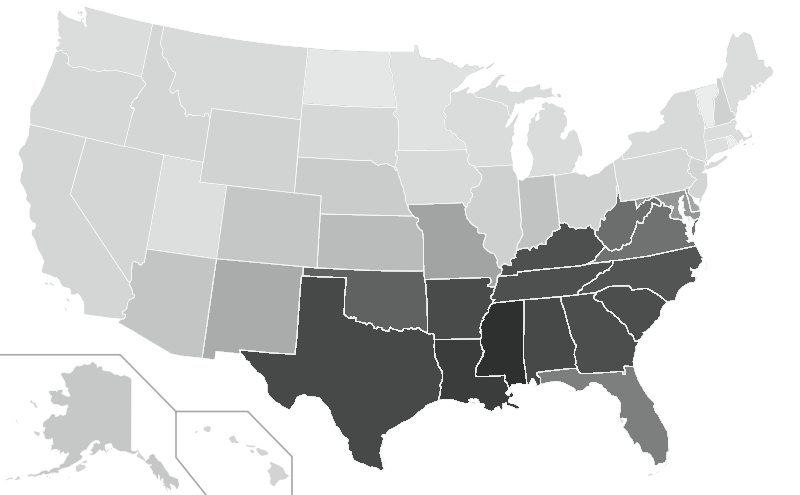
Frequency of either "Y'all" or "You all" to address a group of two or more people, according to an Internet survey of American dialect variation

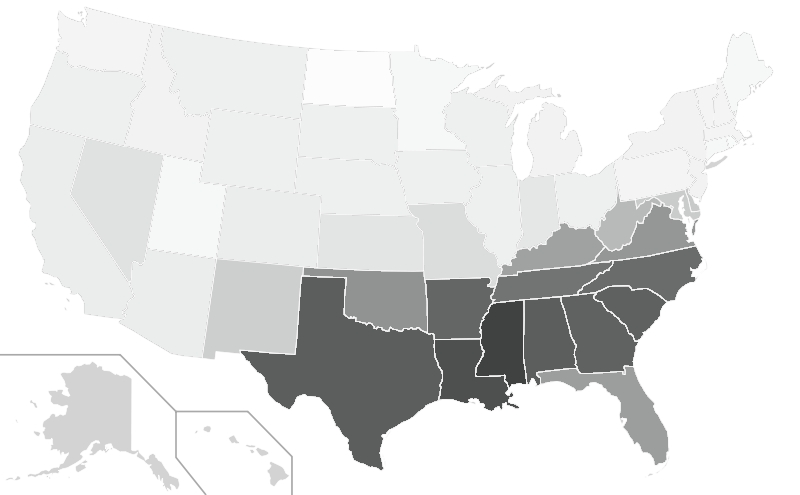
Frequency of just "Y'all" to address a group of two or more people, according to an Internet survey of American dialect variation

Y'all is a second-person singular pronoun that used to refer to a single group. It is originally a contraction – you all.

- When addressing a single group collectively y'all is used.
- When addressing multiple distinct groups, all y'all is used ("I know all y'all.")
- The possessive form of Y'all is created by adding the standard "-'s" as in: "I've got y'all's assignments here." /jɔlz/

=== Southern Louisiana ===
Southern Louisiana English especially is known for some unique vocabulary: long sandwiches are often called poor boys or po' boys, woodlice/roly-polies called doodle bugs, the end of a bread loaf called a nose, pedestrian islands and median strips alike called neutral ground, and sidewalks called banquettes.

== Relationship to African-American English ==
Discussion of "Southern dialect" in the United States sometimes focuses on those English varieties spoken by white Southerners. However, because "Southern" is a geographic term, "Southern dialect" may also encompass dialects developed among other social or ethnic groups in the South. The most prominent of these dialects is African-American Vernacular English (AAVE), a fairly unified variety of English spoken by working and middle-class African-Americans throughout the United States. AAVE exhibits a relationship with both older and newer Southern dialects, though there is not yet a broad consensus on the exact nature of this relationship.

The historical context of race and slavery in the United States is a central factor in the development of AAVE. From the 16th to 19th centuries, many Africans speaking a diversity of West African languages were captured, brought to the United States, and sold into slavery. Over many generations, these Africans and their African-American descendants picked up English to communicate with their white enslavers and the white servants that they sometimes worked alongside, and they also used English as a bridge language to communicate with each other in the absence of another common language. There were also some African Americans living as free people in the United States, though the majority lived outside of the South due to Southern state laws which enabled white enslavers to "recapture" anyone not perceived as white and force them into slavery.

Following the American Civil War – and the subsequent national abolition of explicitly racial slavery in the 19th century – many newly freed African Americans and their families remained in the United States. Some stayed in the South, while others moved to join communities of African-American free people living outside of the South. Soon, racial segregation laws followed by decades of cultural, sociological, economic, and technological changes such as WWII and the increasing prevalence of mass media further complicated the relationship between AAVE and all other English dialects.

Modern AAVE retains similarities to older speech patterns spoken among white Southerners. Many features suggest that it largely developed from nonstandard dialects of colonial English as spoken by white Southern planters and British indentured servants, plus a more minor influence from the creoles and pidgins spoken by black Caribbeans. There is also evidence of some influence of West African languages on the vocabulary and grammar of AAVE.

It is uncertain to what extent current white Southern English borrowed elements from early AAVE, and vice versa. Like many white accents of English once spoken in Southern plantation areas—namely, the Lowcountry, the Virginia Piedmont, Tidewater, and the lower Mississippi Valley—the modern-day AAVE accent is mostly non-rhotic (or "r-dropping"). The presence of non-rhoticity in both AAVE and old Southern English is not merely coincidence, though, again, which dialect influenced which is unknown. It is better documented, however, that white Southerners borrowed some morphological processes from black Southerners.

Many grammatical features were used alike by white speakers of old Southern English and early AAVE, more so than by contemporary speakers of the same two varieties. Even so, contemporary speakers of both continue to share these unique grammatical features: "existential it", the word y'all, double negatives, was to mean were, deletion of had and have, them to mean those, the term fixin' to, stressing the first syllable of words like hotel or guitar, and many others. Both dialects also continue to share these same pronunciation features: /ɪ/ tensing, /ʌ/ raising, upgliding /ɔ/, the pin–pen merger, and the most defining sound of the current Southern accent (though rarely documented in older Southern accents): the glide weakening of /aɪ/. However, while this glide weakening has triggered among white Southerners a complicated "Southern Vowel Shift", African-American speakers in the South and elsewhere are "not participating or barely participating" in much of this shift. AAVE speakers also do not front the vowel starting positions of /oʊ/ and /u/, thus aligning these characteristics more with the speech of 19th-century white Southerners than 20th-century white Southerners.

Another possible influence on the divergence of AAVE and white Southern American English (i.e., the disappearance of older Southern American English) is that historical and contemporary civil rights struggles have over time caused the two racial groups "to stigmatize linguistic variables associated with the other group". This may explain some of the differences outlined above, including why most traditionally non-rhotic white Southern accents have shifted to become intensely rhotic.

== Social perceptions ==
In the United States, there is a general negative stigma surrounding the Southern dialect. Non–Southern Americans tend to associate a Southern accent with lower social and economic status, cognitive and verbal slowness, lack of education, ignorance, bigotry, or religious or political conservatism, using common labels like "hick", "hillbilly", or "redneck accent". Meanwhile, Southerners themselves tend to have mixed judgments of their accent, some similarly negative but others positively associating it with a laid-back, plain, or humble attitude. The accent is also associated nationwide with the military, NASCAR, and country music.

Furthermore, non–Southern American country singers typically imitate a Southern accent in their music. A notable example of this is Taylor Swift, whose career, public image, and many recorded interviews have made her a remarkable object of study of personal dialect change. Swift was born in West Reading, Pennsylvania, and moved to Hendersonville, Tennessee, to pursue a career in country music, where she "adopted a thick, yet charming, Southern accent", according to Destinee Adams from NPR, which was especially prominent in her self-titled debut album. As Swift transitioned from country to pop music, her accent shifted to a more neutral General American.

The sum of negative associations nationwide, however, is the main presumable cause of a gradual decline of Southern accent features, since the middle of the 20th century onwards, particularly among younger and more urban residents of the South.

In a study of children's attitudes about accents published in 2012, Tennessee children from five to six were indifferent about the qualities of persons with different accents, but children from Chicago were not. Chicago children from five to six (speakers of Northern American English) were much more likely to attach positive traits to Northern speakers than Southern ones. The study's results suggest that social perceptions of Southern English are taught by parents to children.

In 2014, the US Department of Energy at the Oak Ridge National Laboratory in Tennessee offered a voluntary "Southern accent reduction" class so that employees could be "remembered for what they said rather than their accents". The course offered accent neutralization through code-switching. The class was canceled because of the resulting controversy and complaints from Southern employees, who were offended by the class since it stigmatized Southern accents.

== See also ==
- Accent perception
- African-American English
- Appalachian English
- Drawl
- High Tider
- Regional vocabularies of American English
- Southern literature
- Texan English

== Sources ==
- Atwood, E. Bagby (1953). A Survey of Verb Forms in the Eastern United States. University of Michigan Press.
- Bernstein, Cynthia (2003). "Grammatical features of southern speech: yall, might could, and fixin to". In Nagel, Stephen J.; Sanders, Sara L. (eds.). English in the Southern United States. Cambridge: Cambridge University Press. pp. 106–118. ISBN 978-0-521-82264-0.
- Clopper, Cynthia G; Pisoni, David B (2006). "The Nationwide Speech Project: A new corpus of American English dialects". Speech Communication. 48 (6): 633–644. doi:10.1016/j.specom.2005.09.010. PMC 3060775. PMID 21423815.
- Crystal, David (2000). The Cambridge Encyclopedia of the English language. Cambridge: Cambridge University Press. ISBN 978-0-521-82348-7.
- Cukor-Avila, Patricia (2001). "Co-existing grammars: The relationship between the evolution of African American and Southern White Vernacular English in the South". In Lanehart, Sonja (ed.). Sociocultural and Historical Contexts of African American English. Varieties of English Around the World. Amsterdam: John Benjamins Publishing Company. pp. 93–128.
- Cukor-Avila, Patricia (2003). "The complex grammatical history of African-American and white vernaculars in the South". In Nagel, Stephen J.; Sanders, Sara L. (eds.). English in the Southern United States. Cambridge: Cambridge University Press. pp. 82–105. ISBN 978-0-521-82264-0.
- Dubois, Sylvie; Horvath, Barbara M. (2004). "Cajun Vernacular English: phonology". In Kortmann, Bernd; Schneider, Edgar Werner (eds.). A Handbook of Varieties of English: A Multimedia Reference Tool. New York: Mouton de Gruyter. pp. 407–416. ISBN 3110197189.
- Hayes, Dean (2013). The Southern Accent and 'Bad English': A Comparative Perceptual Study of the Conceptual Network between Southern Linguistic Features and Identity (Thesis).
- Hazen, Kirk; Fluharty, Ellen (2003). "Defining Appalachian English". In Bender, Margaret (ed.). Linguistic Diversity in the South. Athens: University of Georgia Press. pp. 50–65. ISBN 978-0-8203-2586-6.
- Johnston, Barbara (2003). "Features and Uses of Southern Style". In Nagel, Stephen J.; Sanders, Sara L. (eds.). English in the Southern United States. Cambridge: Cambridge University Press. pp. 189–207. ISBN 978-0-521-82264-0.
- Labov, William (1998). "The three dialects of English". In Lnn, Michael D. (ed.). Handbook of Dialects and Language Variation. San Diego: Academic Press. pp. 39–81.
- Labov, William; Ash, Sharon; Boberg, Charles (2006), The Atlas of North American English, Berlin: Mouton de Gruyter, ISBN 978-3-11-016746-7, archived from the original on July 21, 2019
- Montgomery, Michael (1998). "Multiple Modals in LAGS and LAMSAS". In Montgomery, Michael; Nunnaly, Thomas E (eds.). From the Gulf States and Beyond: the legacy of Lee Pederson and LAGS. Tuscaloosa: The University of Alabama Press.
- Reaser, Jeffrey; Wilbanks, Eric; Wojcik, Karissa; Wolfram, Walt (2018). "Variable r-Lessness in Cajun English". Language Variety in the New South: Contemporary Perspectives on Change and Variation. UNC Press Books. pp. 135–152. ISBN 978-1-4696-3881-2.
- Schneider, Edgar (2003). "Shakespeare in the coves and hollows? Toward a history of Southern English". In Nagel, Stephen J.; Sanders, Sara L. (eds.). English in the Southern United States. Cambridge: Cambridge University Press. pp. 17–35. ISBN 978-0-521-82264-0.
- Thomas, Erik R. (2004). "Rural White Southern Accents". In Kortmann, Bernd; Schneider, Edgar Werner (eds.). A Handbook of Varieties of English: A Multimedia Reference Tool. New York: Mouton de Gruyter. pp. 300–324. ISBN 3110197189.
- Thomas, Erik R. (2007), "Phonological and phonetic characteristics of African American Vernacular English", Language and Linguistics Compass, 1 (5): 450–475, doi:10.1111/j.1749-818X.2007.00029.x
- Tillery, Jan; Bailey, Guy (2004). "The urban South: phonology". In Kortmann, Bernd; Schneider, Edgar Werner (eds.). A Handbook of Varieties of English: A Multimedia Reference Tool. New York: Mouton de Gruyter. pp. 325–337. ISBN 3110197189.
- Wells, John C. (1982). Accents of English 1: An Introduction. Cambridge University Press. ISBN 0-521-28541-0.
- Wolfram, Walt (2003). "Enclave dialect communities in the South". In Nagel, Stephen J.; Sanders, Sara L. (eds.). English in the Southern United States. Cambridge: Cambridge University Press. pp. 141–158. ISBN 978-0-521-82264-0.
- Wolfram, Walt; Schilling-Estes, Natalie (2004), American English (Second ed.), Malden, MA: Blackwell Publishing
