= Phonetic environment =

In linguistics (particularly phonetics and phonology), the phonetic environment of any given instance of a phone, a human speech sound, consists of the other phones adjacent to and surrounding it. A speech sound's phonetic environment, sometimes more broadly called its phonological environment, can determine its allophonic or phonemic qualities in a given language.

For example, the English vowel sound [æ], traditionally called the short A, in a word like mat (phonetically [mæt]), has the consonant [m] preceding it and the consonant [t] following it, while the [æ] vowel itself is word-internal and forms the syllable nucleus. This all describes the phonetic environment of [æ].

== See also ==
- Allophone
- Complementary distribution
- Contrastive distribution
- Free variation
- List of phonetics topics
- Minimal pair
- Phoneme
