= Chain shift =

Sound changes affecting each other

In historical linguistics, a chain shift is a set of sound changes in which the change in pronunciation of one speech sound (typically, a phoneme) is linked to, and presumably causes, a change in pronunciation of other sounds. The sounds involved in a chain shift can be ordered into a "chain" in such a way that after the change is complete, each phoneme ends up sounding like what the phoneme before it in the chain sounded like before the change. The changes making up a chain shift, interpreted as rules of phonology, are in what is termed counterfeeding order.

A well-known example is the Great Vowel Shift, which was a chain shift that affected all of the long vowels in Middle English. The changes to the front vowels may be summarized as follows:

aː → eː → iː → aɪ

A drag chain or pull chain is a chain shift in which the phoneme at the "leading" edge of the chain changes first. In the example above, the chain shift would be a pull chain if /i:/ changed to /aɪ/ first, opening up a space at the position of [i], which /e:/ then moved to fill. A push chain is a chain shift in which the phoneme at the "end" of the chain moves first: in this example, if /aː/ moved toward [eː], a "crowding" effect would be created and /e:/ would thus move toward [i], and so forth. It is not known which phonemes changed first during the Great Vowel Shift; many scholars believe the high vowels such as /i:/ started the shift, but some suggest that the low vowels, such as /aː/, may have shifted first.

== Examples ==
During the Great Vowel Shift in the 15th and 16th centuries, all of the long vowels of Middle English, which correspond to tense vowels in Modern English, shifted pronunciation. The changes can be summarized as follows:

Great Vowel Shift
Front vowels	eː → i: → aɪ
Front vowels	ɛ: → i: or eː
Back vowels	ɔː → oː → uː → aʊ
Back vowels	aː → eː

Most vowels shifted to a higher place of articulation, so that the pronunciation of geese changed from /ɡeːs/ to /ɡiːs/ and broken from /brɔːken/ to /broːkən/. The high vowels /iː/ and /uː/ became diphthongs (for example, mice changed from /miːs/ to /maɪs/), and the low back vowel /aː/ was fronted, causing name to change from /naːmə/ to /neːm/.

The Great Vowel Shift occurred over centuries, and not all varieties of English were affected in the same ways. For example, some speakers in Scotland still pronounce house similarly to its sound in Middle English before the shift, as [hu(ː)s].

A chain shift may affect only one regional dialect of a language, or it may begin in a particular regional dialect and then expand beyond the region in which it originated. A number of recent regional chain shifts have occurred in English. Perhaps the most well known is the Northern Cities Vowel Shift, which is largely confined to the "Inland North" region of the United States. Other examples in North America are the Pittsburgh Vowel Shift, the Southern Vowel Shift (in the Southern United States), and the Low-Back-Merger Shift. In England, the Cockney vowel shift among working-class Londoners is familiar from its prominence in plays such as George Bernard Shaw's Pygmalion (and the related musical My Fair Lady):

iː → eɪ → aɪ → ɔɪ → oɪ

Many chain shifts are vowel shifts, because many sets of vowels are naturally arranged on a multi-value scale (e.g. vowel height or frontness). However, chain shifts can also occur in consonants. A famous example of such a shift is the well-known First Germanic Sound Shift or Grimm's Law, in which the Proto-Indo-European voiceless stop consonants became fricatives, the plain voiced stops became voiceless, and the breathy voiced stops became plain voiced:

bʱ → b → p → f
dʱ → d → t → θ
ɡʱ → ɡ → k → h, x

Another is the High German consonant shift which separated Old High German from other West Germanic dialects (namely Old English, Old Frisian, Old Saxon, and Old Low Franconian).

d → t → ts, s
ɡ → k → kx, x
b → p → pf, f

Note that the rightmost development in the table is the oldest (drag chain). The degrees to which High German dialects have completed these changes vary vastly (see Rhenish fan).

The Romance languages to the north and west of central Italy (e.g. French, Spanish, Portuguese, Catalan and various northern Italian languages) are known for a set of chain shifts collectively termed lenition, which affected stop consonants between vowels:

pp → p → b → β, v
tt → t → d → ð (or vanishes)
kk → k → ɡ → ɣ, j (or vanishes)

In this case, each sound became weaker (or more "lenited").

== Synchronic shifts ==
It is also possible for chain shifts to occur synchronically, within the phonology of a language as it exists at a single point in time.

Nzebi (or Njebi), a Bantu language of Gabon, has the following chain shift, triggered morphophonologically by certain tense/aspect suffixes:

a	→	ɛ	→	e	→	i
				ə	→	i
		ɔ	→	o	→	u

Examples follow:

Underlying form	Chain-shifted form
sal "to work"	sal-i → sɛli
βɛɛd "to give"	βɛɛd-i → βeedi
bet "to carry"	bet-i → biti
bis "to refuse"	bis-i → bisi
kolən "to go down"	kolən-i → kulini
tɔɔd "to arrive"	tɔɔd-i → toodi
suɛm "to hide oneself"	suɛm-i → suemi

Another example of a chain from Bedouin Hijazi Arabic involves vowel raising and deletion:

a	→	i	→	deletion

In nonfinal open syllables, /a/ raises to /i/ while /i/ in the same position is deleted.

Synchronic chain shifts may be circular. An example of this is Xiamen tone or Taiwanese tone sandhi:

53	→	44	→	22	→	21	→	53

The contour tones are lowered to a lower tone, and the lowest tone (21) circles back to the highest tone (53).

Synchronic chain shifts are an example of the theoretical problem of phonological opacity. Although easily accounted for in a derivational rule-based phonology, its analysis in standard parallel Optimality Theory is problematic.

== See also ==
- Isogloss
- Sound change
