= Fronting (sound change) =

Systematic fronting of speech sounds in the vocal tract

In phonetics and phonology, fronting is a sound change in which a vowel or consonant becomes pronounced further to the front of the vocal tract (advanced) than some reference point. The opposite situation, in which a sound becomes pronounced further to the back of the vocal tract, is called backing or retraction. Fronting may be triggered by a nearby sound, in which case it is a form of assimilation, or may occur on its own.

== Examples ==
=== Assimilation ===
In i-mutation and Germanic umlaut, a back vowel is fronted under the influence of /i/ or /j/ in a following syllable.

=== Vowel shifts ===
In the Attic and Ionic dialects of Ancient Greek, Proto-Greek close back /u uː/ were fronted to /y yː/. This change occurred in all cases and was not triggered by a nearby front consonant or vowel. Similarly in French and Occitan, this sound change also occurred.

In Old English and Old Frisian, the back vowels /ɑ ɑː/ were fronted to /æ æː/ in certain cases. For more information, see first a-fronting and second a-fronting.

In many dialects of English, the vowel /uː/ is fronted to [u̟ː] or [ʉː], a sound change that is sometimes called GOOSE-fronting. The same sound change occurred in many dialects of Norwegian and Standard Swedish but not in Danish.

Fronting can also take place as part of a chain shift. For example, in the Northern Cities Vowel Shift, the raising of /æ/ left room in the low-front area of the vowel space for /ɑ/ to expand. Thus, words like cot and father are often pronounced with a low-front vowel [æ].

=== Speech disorders ===
Alveolarization, a specific type of fronting, is a commonly recognized adolescent speech sound disorder. English-speaking children who exhibit this disorder replace posterior consonants (specifically, palato-alveolars and velars) /ʃ, ʒ, k, ɡ, ŋ/ with anterior consonants (specifically, alveolars) /s, z, t, d, n/. The (inter)dental fricatives /θ, ð/ may also be alveolarized to /s, z/, though in which case it is a form of backing. Less commonly, the inverse situation may occur, in which anterior consonants are replaced with posterior consonants; this is also a form of backing.

Another common fronting speech disorder is labialization. English-speaking children who exhibit this disorder replace anterior consonants (both (inter)dentals and alveolars) /θ, ð, s, z, t, d, n/ with labial consonants (both labiodentals and bilabials) /f, v, p, b, m/. Typically, the fricatives are fronted to labiodentals, while the occlusives are fronted to bilabials (aligning with the places that labial consonants occur in standard English phonology).

A disorder similar to but distinct from labialization is gliding. English-speaking children who exhibit this disorder replace liquid consonants /l, r/ with the semivowel (glide) /w/, as well as to a lesser extent and in more restricted cases /j/.

=== Consonant variation ===
In some dialects of English, the (inter)dental fricatives /θ, ð/ and the rhotic /r/ are fronted to labiodentals [f, v, ʋ] or to bilabials [ɸ, β, w]. Such processes are called th-fronting and r-labialization, respectively. In other dialects, the (inter)dental fricatives are instead backed to [s, z], a process called th-alveolarization. Due their association with speech disorders resulting in similar pronunciations, these dialectal variations are sometimes stigmatized.

== See also ==
- Palatalization (sound change) – Systematic shifting of speech sounds toward the hard palate
- Raising (sound change) – Systematic raising of the tongue in speech sounds
