= Inland Northern American English =

Dialect spoken in the Great Lakes region

- Region: Central and Western New York, Northeastern Pennsylvania, Midwestern United States
- Language family: Indo-European: Germanic; West Germanic; Ingvaeonic; Anglo–Frisian; English; North American English; American English; Inland Northern American English
- Early forms: Old English: Middle English; Early Modern English

Language codes
- ISO 639-3: –
- Glottolog: nort3317

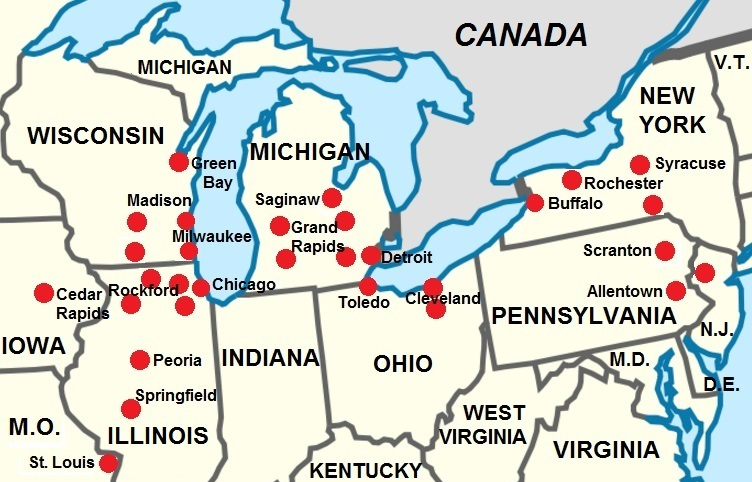
This map shows, with red circles, the exact cities identified within the Inland North dialect region, according to Labov et al.'s (2006) ANAE.

Speech example
An example of a male speaker from the Buffalo area

Speech example
An example of a female speaker from the Milwaukee area

Inland Northern (American) English, also known in American linguistics as the Inland North or Great Lakes dialect, is an American English dialect spoken primarily by White Americans throughout much of the U.S. Great Lakes region. The most distinctive Inland Northern accents are spoken in Chicago, Detroit, Cleveland, Milwaukee, Buffalo, Rochester, and Syracuse. The dialect can be heard as far east as upstate New York and as far west as eastern Iowa and even among certain demographics in the Twin Cities, Minnesota. Some of its features have also infiltrated a geographic corridor from Chicago southwest along historic Route 66 into St. Louis; today, the corridor shows a mixture of both Inland North and Midland American accents. Linguists often characterize the northwestern Great Lakes region's dialect separately as North-Central American English.

The early 20th-century accent of the Inland North was the basis for the term "General American", though the regional accent has since altered, due to the Northern cities vowel shift, its now-defining chain shift of vowels that began in the 1930s or possibly earlier. A 1969 study first formally showed lower-middle-class women leading the regional population in the first two stages (raising of the TRAP vowel and fronting of the LOT/PALM vowel) of this shift, documented since the 1970s as comprising five distinct stages. But evidence since the mid-2010s suggests a retreat away from the Northern Cities Shift in many Inland Northern cities and toward a less marked American accent. Various common names for the Inland Northern accent exist, often based on city, for example: Chicago accent, Detroit accent, Cleveland accent, etc.

== Geographic distribution ==
Three isoglosses identifying the NCVS. In the brown areas STRUT (/ʌ/→/ɔ/) is more retracted than LOT (/ɒ/→/a/). The blue line encloses areas in which DRESS is backed (/ɛ/→[ɜ~ɐ]). The red line encloses areas in which TRAP (/æ/→/ɛ/) is diphthongized to [eə] even before oral consonants. The areas enclosed by all three lines may be considered the "core" of the NCVS; it is most consistently present in Syracuse, Rochester, Buffalo, Detroit, and Chicago. Adapted from Labov, Ash & Boberg (2006), p. 204.

The dialect region called the "Inland North" consists of all but the east of Upstate New York (Buffalo, Binghamton, Ithaca, Jamestown, Ogdensburg, Rochester, Syracuse, Utica, Watertown); northern Ohio (Cleveland, Akron, Sandusky, Toledo), Michigan's Lower Peninsula (Detroit, Ann Arbor, Bay City, Coldwater, Flint, Grand Rapids, Midland, Lansing, Kalamazoo, Muskegon, Niles, Pontiac, Port Huron, Saginaw); northwestern Indiana (Gary, South Bend, Valparaiso); northern Illinois (Chicago, Freeport, Kankakee, Rock Island, Rockford, Sterling); southern and eastern Wisconsin (Milwaukee, Appleton, Dodgeville, Fond du Lac, Green Bay, Janesville, Kenosha, Madison, Manitowoc, Oshkosh, Platteville, Racine, Sheboygan); eastern-central Iowa (Cedar Rapids, Davenport, Dubuque, Iowa City); and, largely, northeastern Pennsylvania's Coal Region (Allentown, Bethlehem, Carbondale, Easton, Hazleton, Scranton, Stroudsburg, Towanda, Wilkes-Barre). This is the dialect spoken in part of America's chief industrial region, an area sometimes known as the Rust Belt. Northern Iowa and southern Minnesota may also variably fall within the Inland North dialect region; in the Twin Cities, educated middle-aged men in particular have been documented as aligning to the accent, though this is not necessarily the case among other demographics of that urban area.

Linguists identify the "St. Louis Corridor", extending from Chicago down into St. Louis, as a dialectally remarkable area, because young and old speakers alike have a Midland accent, except for a single middle generation born between the 1920s and 1940s, who have an Inland Northern accent diffused into the area from Chicago.

Erie, Pennsylvania, though in the geographic area of the "Inland North" and featuring some speakers of this dialect, never underwent the Northern Cities Shift and often shares more features with Western Pennsylvania English due to contact with Pittsburghers, particularly with Erie as their choice of city for summer vacations. Many African Americans in Detroit and other Northern cities are multidialectal and also or exclusively use African-American Vernacular English rather than Inland Northern English, but some do use the Inland Northern dialect.

=== Social factors ===
The dialect's progression across the Midwest has stopped at a general boundary line traveling through central Ohio, Indiana, and Illinois and then western Wisconsin, on the other side of which speakers have continued to maintain their Midland and North-Central accents. Sociolinguist William Labov theorizes that this separation reflects a political divide; a controlled study of his shows that Inland Northern speakers tend to be more associated with liberal politics than speakers of the other two dialects, especially as Americans continue to self-segregate in residence based on ideological concerns. Former president Barack Obama, for example, has a mild Inland Northern accent despite not having lived in the dialect region until young adulthood.

== Phonology and phonetics ==
The monophthongs of Southern Michigan on a vowel chart, typical of the Northern cities vowel shift, though not to the extreme. Adapted from Hillenbrand (2003).

The diphthongs of Southern Michigan on a vowel chart, adapted from Hillenbrand (2003).

Vocalic phonemes of INAE
	Front	Central	Back	
	tense	lax	lax	tense
Close	i	ɪ	ʊ	u
Close-mid	eɪ	ə		oʊ
Open-mid	æ	ɛ	ʌ	
Open	ɑ			ɔ
Diphthongs	aɪ ɔɪ aʊ			

All vowels of the Inland Northern dialect
Pure vowels (Monophthongs)
English diaphoneme	Inland Northern realization	Example words
/æ/	ɛə~eə~ɪə	bath, trap, man
/ɑː/	a~ä	blah, father, spa
/ɒ/^{†}	a~ä	lot, bother, wasp
/ɔː/	ɒ~ɑ	dog, loss, off
/ɔː/	ɒ~ɑ	all, bought, saw
/ɛ/	ɛ~ɜ~ɐ	dress, met, bread
/ə/	ə	about, syrup, arena
/ɪ/	ɪ~ɘ~ə̟	hit, skim, tip
/iː/	ɪi~i	beam, chic, fleet
/ʌ/	ʌ~ɔ	bus, flood, what
/ʊ/	ʊ	book, put, should
/uː/	u~ɵu	food, glue, new
Diphthongs
/aɪ/	ae~aɪ~æɪ	ride, shine, try
/aɪ/	ɐɪ~əɪ~ʌɪ	bright, dice, fire
/aʊ/	äʊ~ɐʊ	now, ouch, scout
/eɪ/	eɪ~e	lame, rein, stain
/ɔɪ/	ɔɪ	boy, choice, moist
/oʊ/	ʌo~oʊ~o	goat, oh, show
R-colored vowels
/ɑːr/	aɻ~ɐɻ	barn, car, park
/ɪər/	iɻ~iɚ	fear, peer, tier
/ɛər/	eəɻ~eɻ	bare, bear, there
/ɜːr/	əɻ~ɚ	burn, doctor, first, herd, learn, murder
/ər/	əɻ~ɚ	burn, doctor, first, herd, learn, murder
/ɔːr/	ɔɻ~oɻ	hoarse, horse, war
/ʊər/	uɻ~oɻ	poor, tour, lure
/jʊər/	jɚ	cure, Europe, pure
† Footnotes When followed by /r/, the historic /ɒ/ is pronounced entirely differently by Inland North speakers as [ɔ~o], for example, in the words orange, forest, and torrent. The only exceptions to this are the words tomorrow, sorry, sorrow, borrow and, for some speakers, morrow, which use the sound [a~ä]. This is all true of General American speakers too.

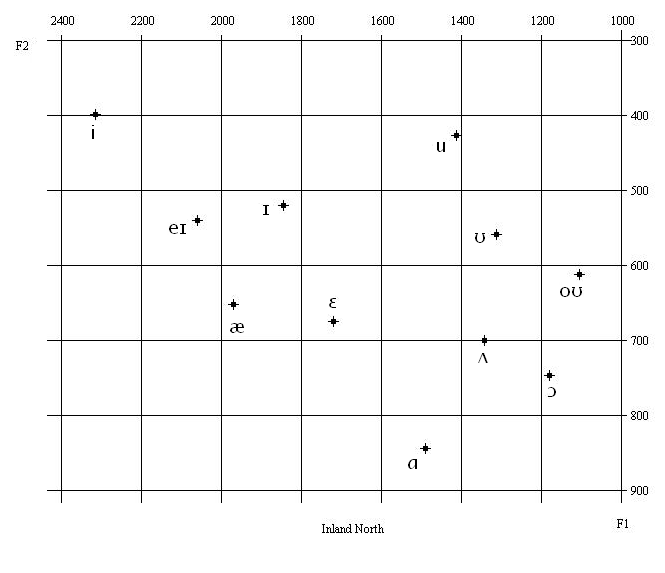
Based on Labov et al.; averaged F1/F2 means for speakers from the Inland North. /æ/ is higher and fronter than /ɛ/, while /ʌ/ is more retracted than /ɑ/.

A Midwestern accent (which may refer to other regional accents as well), Chicago accent, or Great Lakes accent are all common names in the United States for the sound quality produced by speakers of this dialect. Many of the characteristics listed here are not necessarily unique to the region and are oftentimes found elsewhere in the Midwest.

=== Northern cities vowel shift ===
Northern Cities Shift as a vowel chart, based on image in Labov, Ash, and Boberg (1997)'s "A national map of the regional dialects of American English".

The Northern cities vowel shift, or simply Northern cities shift, is a chain shift of vowels and the defining accent feature of the Inland North dialect region, though it can also be found, variably, in the neighboring Upper Midwest and Western New England accent regions.

==== Tensing of TRAP and fronting of LOT/PALM ====
The first two sound changes in the shift, with some debate about which one led to the other or came first, are the general raising and lengthening (tensing) of the "short a" (the vowel sound of TRAP, typically rendered /æ/ in American transcriptions), as well as the fronting of the sound of LOT or PALM in this accent (typically transcribed /ɑ/) toward [ä] or [a]. Inland Northern TRAP raising was first identified in the 1960s, with that vowel becoming articulated with the tongue raised and then gliding back toward the center of the mouth, thus producing a centering diphthong of the type [ɛə], [eə], or at its most extreme [ɪə]; e.g. naturally [ˈneətʃɹəli]. As for LOT/PALM fronting, it can go beyond [ä] to the front [a], and may, for the most advanced speakers, even be close to [æ]—so that stock and botch come to be pronounced how a mainstream American speaker would say stack and batch; e.g. coupon [ˈkʰupan].

==== Lowering of THOUGHT ====
The fronting of the LOT/PALM vowel leaves a blank space that is filled by lowering the "aw" vowel in THOUGHT [ɔ], which itself comes to be pronounced with the tongue in a lower position, closer to [ɑ] or [ɒ]. As a result, for example, people with the shift pronounce caught the way speakers without the shift say cot; thus, shifted speakers pronounce caught as [kʰɑt] (and cot as [kʰat], as explained above). In defiance of the shift, however, there is a well-documented scattering of Inland North speakers who are in a state of transition toward a cot–caught merger; this is particularly evident in northeastern Pennsylvania, where this runs off of the Pittsburgh accent. Younger speakers reversing the fronting of /ɑ/, for example in Lansing, Michigan, also approach a merger.

==== Backing or lowering of DRESS ====
The movement of /æ/ to [ɛə], in order to avoid overlap with the now-fronted /ɑ/ vowel, presumably initiates the consequent shifting of /ɛ/ (the "short e" in DRESS, [ɛ] in General American) away from its original position. Thus, /ɛ/ demonstrates backing, lowering, or a combination of both toward [ɐ], the near-open central vowel, or almost [æ].

==== Backing of STRUT ====
The next change is the movement of /ʌ/ (the STRUT vowel) from a central or back position toward a very far back position [ɔ]. People with the shift pronounce bus so that it sounds more like boss to people without the shift.

==== Backing or lowering of KIT ====
The final change is the backing and lowering of /ɪ/, the "short i" vowel in KIT, toward [ɘ], or even toward the schwa [ə]. Alternatively, KIT may be lowered to [e], without backing. This results in a considerable phonetic overlap between KIT /ɪ/ and COMMA /ə/.

==== Vowels before /r/ ====
Before /r/, only /ɑ/ undergoes the Northern Cities Vowel Shift, so that the vowel in start /stɑrt/ varies much like the one in lot /lɑt/ described above. The remaining /ɔ/, /ɛ/ and /ɪ/ vowels retain values similar to General American (GA) in this position, so that north /nɔrθ/, merry /ˈmɛri/ and near /nɪr/ are pronounced [noɹθ, ˈmɛɹi, niɹ], with unshifted THOUGHT, DRESS and KIT (as close as in GA). Inland Northern American English features the north–force merger, the Mary–marry–merry merger, the mirror–nearer and /ʊr/–/ur/ mergers, the hurry–furry merger, and the nurse–letter merger, all of which are also typical of GA varieties.

=== History of the Northern cities vowel shift ===
William Labov et al.'s Atlas of North American English (2006) presents the first historical understanding of the order in which the Inland North's vowels shifted. Speakers around the Great Lakes began to pronounce the short a sound, /æ/ as in TRAP, as more of a diphthong and with a higher starting point in the mouth, causing the same word to sound more like "tray-ap" or "tray-up"; Labov et al. assume that this began by the middle of the 19th century. After roughly a century following this first vowel change—general /æ/ raising—the region's speakers, around the 1960s, then began to use the newly opened vowel space, previously occupied by /æ/, for /ɑ/ (as in LOT and PALM); therefore, words like bot, gosh, or lock came to be pronounced with the tongue extended farther forward, thus making these words sound more like how bat, gash, and lack sound in dialects without the shift. These two vowel changes were first recognized and reported in 1967. While these were certainly the first two vowel shifts of this accent, and Labov et al. assume that /æ/ raising occurred first, they also admit that the specifics of time and place are unclear. In fact, real-time evidence of a small number of Chicagoans born between 1890 and 1920 suggests that /ɑ/ fronting occurred first, starting by 1900 at the latest, and was followed by /æ/ raising sometime in the 1920s.

During the 1960s, several more vowels followed suit in rapid succession, each filling in the space left by the last, including the lowering of /ɔ/ as in THOUGHT, the backing and lowering of /ɛ/ as in DRESS, the backing of /ʌ/ as in STRUT (first reported in 1986), and the backing and lowering of /ɪ/ as in KIT, often but not always in that exact order. Altogether, this constitutes the Northern Cities Shift, identified by linguists as such in 1972.

==== Possible motivations for the shift ====
Migrants from all over the Northeastern U.S. traveled west to the rapidly industrializing Great Lakes area in the decades after the Erie Canal opened in 1825, and Labov suggests that the Inland North's general /æ/ raising originated from the diverse and incompatible /æ/ raising patterns of these various migrants mixing into a new, simpler pattern. He posits that this hypothetical dialect-mixing event, which initiated the larger Northern Cities Shift (NCS), occurred by about 1860 in upstate New York, and the later stages of the NCS are merely those that logically followed (a "pull chain"). More recent evidence suggests that German-accented English helped to greatly influence the Shift, because German speakers tend to pronounce the English TRAP vowel as [ɛ] and the LOT/PALM vowel as [ä~a], both of which resemble NCS vowels, and there were more speakers of German in the Erie Canal region of upstate New York in 1850 than there were of any single variety of English. There is also evidence for an alternative theory, according to which the Great Lakes area—settled primarily by western New Englanders—simply inherited Western New England English and developed that dialect's vowel shifts further. 20th-century Western New England English variably showed NCS-like TRAP and LOT/PALM pronunciations, which may have already existed among 19th-century New England settlers, though this has been contested. Another theory, not mutually exclusive with the others, is that the Great Migration of African Americans intensified White Northerners' participation in the NCS in order to differentiate their accents from Black ones.

==== Reversals of the shift ====
Recent evidence suggests that the Shift has largely begun to reverse in many cities of the Inland North, such as Chicago, Detroit, Buffalo, Rochester, Syracuse, Lansing, Eau Claire, and Ogdensburg. In particular, /ɑ/ fronting and /æ/ raising (though raising is persisting before nasal consonants, as is the General American norm) have now reversed among younger speakers in these areas. Several possible reasons have been proposed for the reversal, including growing stigma connected with the accent and the working-class identity it represents.

=== Other phonetics ===
- Rhoticity: As in General American, Inland North speech is rhotic, and the r sound is typically the retroflex [ɻ] or perhaps, more accurately, a bunched or molar [ɹ].
- Canadian raising: The raising of the tongue for the nucleus of the gliding vowel /aɪ/ is found in the Inland North when the vowel sound appears before any voiceless consonant, thus distinguishing, for example, between rider and writer by vowel quality. In the Inland North, unlike some other dialects, the raising occurs even before certain voiced consonants, including in the words fire, tiger, iron, and spider. When it is not subject to raising, the nucleus of /aɪ/ is pronounced with the tongue further to the front of the mouth than most other American dialects, as [a̟ɪ] or [ae]; however, in the Inland North speech of Pennsylvania, the nucleus is centralized as in General American, thus: [äɪ].
- The nucleus of /aʊ/ may be more backed than in other common North American accents (toward [ɐʊ] or [ɑʊ]).
- The nucleus of /oʊ/ (as in go and boat), like /aʊ/, tends to be conservative, not undergoing the fronting common in the vast American southeastern super-region. Likewise, the traditionally high back vowel /u/ is conservative, less fronted in the North than in other American regions, though it still undergoes some fronting after coronal consonants. Also, /oʊ/, along with /eɪ/, can traditionally manifest as monophthongs: [e] and [o], respectively.
- The vowel in /ɛg/ can raise toward [e] in words like beg, negative, or segment, except in Michigan.
- Working-class th-stopping: The two sounds represented by the spelling th—/θ/ (as in thin) and /ð/ (as in those)—may shift from fricative consonants to stop consonants among urban and working-class speakers: thus, for example, thin may approach the sound of tin (using [t]) and those may merge to the sound of doze (using [d]). This was parodied in the Saturday Night Live comedy sketch "Bill Swerski's Superfans," in which characters hailing from Chicago pronounce "The Bears" as "Da Bears."
- Caramel is typically pronounced with two syllables as carmel.

== Vocabulary ==
Not all of these terms, here compared with their counterparts in other regions, are necessarily unique only to the Inland North, though they appear most strongly in this region:

- boulevard as a synonym for island (in the sense of a grassy area in the middle of some streets)
- crayfish for a freshwater crustacean
- drinking fountain as a synonym for water fountain
- expressway as a synonym for highway
- faucet for an indoor water tap (not Southern spigot)
- goose pimples as a synonym for goose bumps
- pit for the seed of a peach (not Southern stone or seed)
- pop for a sweet, bubbly soft drink (not Eastern and Californian soda, nor Southern coke)
  - The "soda/pop line" has been found to run through Western New York State (Buffalo residents say pop, Syracuse residents say soda now but used to say pop until sometime in the 1970s, and Rochester residents say either. Eastern Wisconsinites around Milwaukee and some Chicagoans are also an exception, using the word soda.)
- sucker for a lollipop (hard candy on a stick)
- teeter totter as a synonym for seesaw
- tennis shoes for generic athletic shoes; gym shoes in Chicago and Cincinnati (not Northeastern sneakers, except in New York State and Pennsylvania)

Individual cities and sub-regions also have their own terms; for example:

- bubbler, in a large portion of Wisconsin around Milwaukee, for water fountain (in addition to the synonym drinking fountain, also possible throughout the Inland North)
- cash station, in the Chicago area, for ATM; also called a tyme machine (spoken like time machine) in the greater Milwaukee area, from the first predominant ATM brand in the area, TYME
- Devil's Night, particularly in Michigan, for the night before Halloween (not Northeastern Mischief Night)
- doorwalls, in Detroit, for sliding glass doors
- gapers' block or gapers' delay, in Chicago, Milwaukee and Detroit; or gawk block, in Detroit, for traffic congestion caused by rubbernecking
- gym shoes, in Chicago and Detroit, for generic athletic shoes
- party store, in Michigan, for a liquor store
- rummage sale, in Wisconsin, as a synonym for garage sale or yard sale
- treelawn, in Cleveland and Michigan; devilstrip or devil's strip in Akron, Ohio; and right-of-way in Wisconsin and parkway in Chicago for the grass between the sidewalk and the street
- yous(e) or youz, in northeastern Pennsylvania around its urban center of Scranton, for you guys; in this sub-region, there is notable self-awareness of the Inland Northern dialect (locally called by various names, including "Coalspeak"). Youse is also found in Chicago and its hinterland, utilized as a second-person plural pronoun (similar to "y'all").

== Notable lifelong native speakers ==
- Lucille Ball – "teachers denigrated her dancing and her Great Lakes accent"
- Mark Borchardt – "intense Milwaukee accent"
- Bonnie Jo Campbell – "If you want to know why I sound the way I do, read ... about the Northern Cities Vowel Shift"
- Hillary Clinton – "playing down her flat Chicago accent"
- Ron Coomer – "his South Side accent"
- Kathy Cramer – "A Grafton native... her strong Wisconsin accent—'which I've been told I have'"
- Joan Cusack – "a great distinctive voice" that she says is due to "my Chicago accent... my A's are all flat"
- Jeffrey Dahmer – "a wholesome-sounding Midwestern accent"
- Richard J. Daley – "He never outgrew... his Bridgeport accent, the equivalent of the speech that prevails in Queens or South Philadelphia"
- Richard M. Daley – "makes no effort to tame a thick Chicago accent"
- William M. Daley – "the flat, nasal tones of an authentic South Side accent"
- Jimmy Dore – "I think that Chicago comics like Jimmy Dore bring my Wisconsin/Chicago accent back with a vengence [sic]."
- David Draiman – "distinct Chicago accent"
- Doug Ducey – "still has a trademark Midwestern accent"
- Kevin Dunn – "a blue-collar attitude and the Chicago accent to match"
- Paul Dyster – "His super-strong Inland North accent"
- David Eigenberg – "raised in Naperville, Eigenberg naturally speaks with a strong local accent"
- Rahm Emanuel – "more refined (if still very Chicago)"
- Dick Enberg – "with a warm baritone voice and mild Midwestern accent"
- Dennis Farina – "rich Chicago accent"
- Chris Farley – "beatific Wisconsin accent"
- Robert Forster – "accent that sounded like pure Chicago—though he hailed from Rochester, N.Y."
- Dennis Franz – "tough-guy Chicago accent"
- Sean Giambrone – "Sean, whose Chicago accent is thick enough to cut with a knife"
- John Goodman – "Goodman delivered a completely authentic Inland North accent.... It wasn't an act."
- Rob Gronkowski – "the ambiguous sort of accent that sounds, at first, midwestern, but is really the product of upstate New York"
- Edythe Harrison – "a harsh nasal accent of her native Detroit"
- Sue Hawk – "a Midwestern truck driver whose accent and etiquette epitomized the stereotype of the tacky, abrasive, working-class character"
- Kathy Hochul – "She talks plainly... with a distinctive Buffalo accent, drawing out her a's (habits is three syllables) and dropping her terminal g's"
- Bonnie Hunt – "speaks offstage in [an] unfiltered North Side accent"
- Mike Krzyzewski – "his nasal voice... his flat, familiar Chicago accent"
- Dennis Kucinich – "a shining example of Cleveland's version of the Inland North accent"
- Pope Leo XIV – "was born in Chicago (with the accent to prove it)"
- Bill Lipinski – "I could live only 100 miles from the gentleman from Illinois [Lipinski] and he would have an accent and I do not"
- Gerald Locklin – "asking in his Rochester accent,'What's haaappening?' ... until he spoke, still in his distinctive Rochesterian"
- Mike Madigan – "his flat, Southwest Side accent"
- David Mamet – "a chunky Chicago accent that's so thick it borders on Bronxian"
- Larry Manetti – "that Chicago accent"
- Joe Mantegna – "whose broad Chicago accent... his unpretentious Chicago accent"
- Terry McAuliffe – "that rich, unhelpful Syracuse accent"
- Jim "Mr. Skin" McBride – "a clipped Chicago accent"
- Phil Mendelson – "a rasping Cleveland accent"
- Susana Mendoza – "an impeccable Chicago accent"
- Michael Moore – "a Flintoid, with a nasal, uncosmopolitan accent" and "a recognisable blue-collar Michigan accent"
- Bill Murray – "sound[s] Chicago, with those sharp a's, elongated o's and hard consonants"
- Anthony Napolitano – "the thickest Chicago [accent] on the Council"
- Marie Newman – "a noticeable Midwestern accent"
- Bob Odenkirk – "every once in a while you can hear a shade of the Chicago area slip through Oswalt's Minnesotan"
- Suze Orman – "broad, Midwestern accent"
- Iggy Pop – "plainspoken Midwestern accent"
- Robert Rita – "a thick south Chicago accent"
- Ben Rothwell – "The only thing more prominent than Rothwell's size and power is his Kenosha accent."
- Paul Ryan – "may be the first candidate on a major presidential ticket to feature some of the Great Lakes vowels prominently"
- Bob Seger – "I say it with a flat midwestern accent ... My accent is Midwest"
- Rick Snyder – "an intense Michigan accent"
- Nicholas Sposato – "Everybody tells me I can't enter any Chicago accent contest—because I would win it hands down"
- Haley Stevens – "speaks with the type of thick Michigan accent that some predicted would be extinct by now"
- Michael Symon – "Symon's local accent gives him an honest, working-class vibe"
- Lily Tomlin – "Tomlin's Detroit accent"
- Scott Turow – "the Second City native speaks with an unvarnished Midwestese accent that evokes Dennis Farina with an English degree"
- J. J. Watt – "Wisconsin accent has been OK. People don't seem to notice it too much."
- Gretchen Whitmer – "a Michigan accent probably most detectable when she... flattens out her 'a' sounds with a nasal twang"
- Jill Wine-Banks – "a pronounced Great Lakes accent that reflected her Chicago roots"

== See also ==
- List of dialects of English
- North American English regional phonology
- North-Central American English
- Western New England English

== Sources ==
- Castro Calle, Yesid (December 2017). German Echoes in American English: How New-dialect Formation Triggered the Northern Cities Shift (Undergraduate Honors Thesis). Stanford University Department of Linguistics.
- Gordon, Matthew J. (2004). "New York, Philadelphia, and other northern cities: phonology". In Kortmann, Bernd; Burridge, Kate; Mesthrie, Rajend; Schneider, Edgar W.; Upton, Clive (eds.). A Handbook of Varieties of English. Volume 1: Phonology, Volume 2: Morphology and Syntax. Berlin / New York: Mouton de Gruyter. ISBN 9783110175325.
- Labov, William; Ash, Sharon; Boberg, Charles (2006). The Atlas of North American English. Berlin: Mouton de Gruyter. ISBN 3-11-016746-8.
