= Raising (sound change) =

Systematic raising of the tongue in speech sounds

In phonology and phonetics, raising is a sound change in which a vowel or consonant becomes higher or raised, meaning that the tongue becomes more elevated or positioned closer to the roof of the mouth than before. In consonants, this results in greater stricture. The opposite effect is known as lowering. Raising or lowering may be triggered by a nearby sound, when it is a form of assimilation, or it may occur on its own.

== Examples ==
In North American English, there are two common types of vowel raising:

- /æ/ raising, where the phoneme /æ/ is raised before certain consonants. The environments that this feature occurs in vary across dialects, though most commonly it occurs before nasal consonants. In some dialects, the change is merely allophonic. In others, it is phonemic, and minimal pairs exist where raised /æ/ changes the meaning of a word compared to non-raised.
- Canadian raising, where the diphthongs /aɪ/ and /aʊ/ are raised before voiceless consonants, but remain lower for voiced consonants.

In i-mutation, a front vowel is raised before /i/ or /j/, which is assimilation.

In the Attic dialect of Ancient Greek and in Koine Greek, close-mid /eː oː/ were raised to /iː uː/. The change occurred in all cases and was not triggered by a nearby front consonant or vowel. Later, Ancient Greek /ɛː/ was raised to become Koine Greek [eː] and then [iː]. For more information, see Ancient Greek phonology § Vowel raising and fronting

In Czech, the alveolar trill /r/ was raised before /i/ to become the raised alveolar trill /r̝/, spelled ⟨ř⟩ as in ⟨Dvořák⟩. This is a form of palatalization. A similar process occurred in Polish, in which the trill became assibilated to a retroflex sibilant /ʐ/ (spelled ⟨rz⟩ or ⟨ż⟩) around the 16th century. The pronunciation [r̝] in Polish is considered to be nonstandard and is used only by some older speakers.

== See also ==
- Fronting (sound change)
