= North American English regional phonology =

Pronunciation differences in the United States and Canada

North American English regional phonology is the study of variations in the pronunciation of spoken North American English (English of the United States and Canada)—what are commonly known as the continent's regional accents or, simply, American accents. Though studies of regional dialects can be based on multiple characteristics, often including characteristics that are phonemic (sound-based, focusing on major word-differentiating patterns and structures in speech), phonetic (sound-based, focusing on any more exact and specific details of speech), lexical (vocabulary-based), and syntactic (grammar-based), this article focuses only on the former two items. North American English includes American English, which has several highly developed and distinct regional varieties, along with the closely related Canadian English, which is more homogeneous geographically. American English (especially Western dialects) and Canadian English have more in common with each other than with varieties of English outside North America.

The most recent work documenting and studying the phonology of North American English dialects as a whole is the 2006 Atlas of North American English (ANAE) by William Labov, Sharon Ash, and Charles Boberg, on which much of the description below is based, following on a tradition of sociolinguistics dating to the 1960s; earlier large-scale American dialectology focused more on lexicology than on phonology.

== Overview ==
Regional dialects in North America are historically the most strongly differentiated along the Eastern seaboard, due to distinctive speech patterns of urban centers of the American East Coast like Boston, New York City, and certain Southern cities, all of these accents historically noted by their London-like r-dropping (called non-rhoticity), a feature gradually receding among younger generations, especially in the South. The Connecticut River is now regarded as the southern and western boundary of the traditional New England accents, today still centered on Boston and much of Eastern New England. The Potomac River generally divides a group of Northeastern coastal dialects from an area of older Southeastern coastal dialects. All older Southern dialects, however, have mostly now receded in favor of a strongly rhotic, more unified accent group spread throughout the entire Southern United States since the late 1800s and into the early 1900s. In-between the two aforementioned rivers, some other variations exist, most famous among them being New York City English.

Outside of the Eastern seaboard, virtually all other North American English (both in the U.S. and Canada) has been firmly rhotic (pronouncing all r sounds), since the very first arrival of English-speaking settlers. An exception is the English spoken in the insular and culturally British-associated city of Victoria, British Columbia, where non-rhoticity is one of several features in common with British English, and despite the decline of the quasi-British "Van-Isle" accent once spoken throughout southern Vancouver Island, it represents one of only a few distinguishable local dialects of Canadian English spoken west of Quebec.

Rhoticity in central and western North America is a feature shared today with the English of Ireland, for example, rather than most of the English of England, which has become non-rhotic since the late 1700s. The sound of Western U.S. English, overall, is much more homogeneous than Eastern U.S. English. The interior and western half of the country was settled by people who were no longer closely connected to England, living farther from the British-influenced Atlantic Coast.

Certain particular vowel sounds are the best defining characteristics of regional North American English including any given speaker's presence, absence, or transitional state of the so-called cot–caught merger. Northeastern New England, Canadian, and Western Pennsylvania accents, as well as all accents of the Western U.S. have a merger of these /ɔ/ and /ɑ/ vowels, so that pairs of words like mock and talk, rod and clawed, or slot and bought rhyme. On the contrary, Baltimore, Philadelphia and New York metropolitan accents, plus inland accents of the Northern and Southern U.S., all strongly resist this merger, keeping the two sounds separate and thus maintaining an extra distinct vowel sound. The rest of the U.S. largely shows a transitional state of the merger, particularly the Midland dialect region, from Ohio to eastern Kansas.

Another prominent differentiating feature in regional North American English is fronting of the /oʊ/ in words like goat, home, and toe and /u/ in words like goose, two, and glue. This fronting characterizes Midland, Mid-Atlantic, and Southern U.S. accents; these accents also front and raise the /aʊ/ vowel (of words like house, now, and loud), making yowl sound something like yeah-wool or even yale. Northern U.S. English, however, tends to keep all these vowels more backed. Southern and some Midland U.S. accents are often most quickly recognized by the weakening or deleting of the "glide" sound of the /aɪ/ vowel in words like thyme, mile, and fine, making the word spy sound something like spa.

One phenomenon apparently unique to North American U.S. accents is the irregular behavior of words that in the British English standard, Received Pronunciation, have /ɒrV/ (where V stands for any vowel). Words of this class include, among others: origin, Florida, horrible, quarrel, warren, borrow, tomorrow, sorry, and sorrow. In General American there is a split: the majority of these words have /ɔr/ (the sound of the word or), but the last four words of the list above have /ɑr/ (the sound of the words are). In Canada, all of these words are pronounced as /oʊr/ (same as General American /ɔr/ but analyzed differently). In the accents of Greater New York City, Philadelphia, the Carolinas and older Southern, most or all of these words are pronounced /ɑr/ (Shitara 1993).

== Classification of regional accents ==
=== Hierarchy of regional accents ===
The findings and categorizations of the 2006 The Atlas of North American English (or ANAE), use one well-supported way to hierarchically classify North American English accents at the level of broad geographic regions, sub-regions, etc. The North American regional accent represented by each branch, in addition to each of its own features, also contains all the features of the branch it extends from.

- NORTH AMERICA
  - CANADA and WESTERN UNITED STATES = conservative /oʊ/ + /u/ is fronted + cot–caught merger
    - Atlantic Canada = /ɑ/ is fronted before /r/ + full Canadian raising
    - Standard Canada and Northwest = /ɑ/ is backed before /r/ + /æ/ is tensed before /ɡ/ + Canadian Shift ([a] ← /æ/ ← /ɛ/ ← /ɪ/)
      - Inland Canada = full Canadian raising
  - GREATER NEW YORK CITY = fronted /aʊ/ + conservative /oʊ/ and /u/ + cot–caught distinction + New York /æ/ split system + Mary–marry–merry 3-way distinction
    - New York City = R-dropping
  - NEW ENGLAND and NORTH-CENTRAL UNITED STATES = conservative /oʊ/ + conservative /u/ + conservative /aʊ/ + pin–pen distinction
    - North = cot–caught distinction + /ɑ/ is fronted before /r/
      - Inland North = /æ/ is often tensed, encouraging the Northern Cities Shift ([ɛə] ← /æ/ ← /ɑ/ ← /ɔ/ ← /ʌ/ ← /ɛ/)
    - Eastern New England = R-dropping + full Canadian raising
      - Northeastern New England = cot–caught merger + father–bother distinction + /ɑ/ is fronted before /r/
      - Rhode Island = cot–caught distinction + conservative /ɑ/ before /r/
    - Upper Midwest = cot–caught merger + /ɑ/ is central before /r/ + /æ/ is tensed before /ɡ/
      - Wisconsin and Minnesota = haggle–Hegel merger
  - SOUTHEASTERN UNITED STATES = /aʊ/ is fronted + /oʊ/ is fronted + /u/ is fronted
    - Southeastern Super-Region = cot–caught distinction or near-merger
      - Mid-Atlantic = Mid-Atlantic /æ/ split system + Mary–marry–merry 3-way distinction
      - Midland = /aɪ/ can be monophthongized before resonants + variable pin–pen merger + /ʌ/ is fronted
      - South = /aɪ/ is monophthongized, encouraging the Southern Shift ([a] ← /aɪ/ ← /eɪ/ ← /i/ and drawling) + pin–pen merger + /ʌ/ is fronted
        - Inland South = Back Upglide Chain Shift ([æɔ] ← /aʊ/ ← /ɔ/ ← /ɔɪ/) + fill–feel merger
    - Marginal Southeast = cot–caught merger
      - Western Pennsylvania = cot–caught merger, encouraging the Pittsburgh Chain Shift ([ɒ~ɔ] ← /ɑ/ ← /ʌ/) + full–fool merger
        - Pittsburgh = /aʊ/ can be monophthongized before /l/ and /r/, and in unstressed function words

==== Maps of regional accents ====
The map above shows the major regional dialects of American English (each designated in all caps), as demarcated primarily by Labov et al.'s The Atlas of North American English, as well as the related Telsur Project's regional maps. Any region may also contain speakers of "General American," the notional accent ascribed to American English speakers who have receded away from the marked sounds of their region. Furthermore, this map does not account for speakers of ethnic, cultural, or other not-strictly-regional varieties (such as African-American Vernacular English, Chicano English, Cajun English, etc.). All regional American English dialects, unless specifically stated otherwise, are rhotic, with the father–bother merger, Mary–marry–merry merger, and pre-nasal "short a" tensing. (Note: Dialects are considered "rhotic" if they pronounce the r sound in all historical environments, without ever "dropping" this sound. The father–bother merger is the pronunciation of /ɒ/ (as in cot, lot, bother, etc.) the same as /ɑ/ (as in spa, haha, Ma), causing words like con and Kahn and like sob and Saab to sound identical, with the vowel usually realized in the back or middle of the mouth as [ɑ~ɑ̈]. Finally, most of the U.S. participates in a continuous nasal system of the "short a" vowel (in cat, trap, bath, etc.), causing /æ/ to be pronounced with the tongue raised and with a glide quality (typically sounding like [ɛə]) particularly when before a nasal consonant; thus, mad is [mæd], but man is more like [mɛən].)

Western
The Western dialect, including Californian and New Mexican sub-types (with Pacific Northwest English also, arguably, a sub-type), is defined by:
- Cot–caught merger to [ɑ]
- GOAT is [oʊ]
- GOOSE is [ü~ʉ]
North Central
The North Central ("Upper Midwest") dialect, including an Upper Michigan sub-type, is defined by:
- Cot–caught merger to [ɑ̈]
- GOAT is [oʊ] (and may even monophthongize to [o])
- GOOSE is [u]
Inland Northern
The Inland Northern ("Great Lakes") dialect is defined by:
- No cot–caught merger: the cot vowel is [ɑ̈~a] and caught vowel is [ɒ]
- /æ/ is universally [ɛə], the triggering event for the Northern Cities Vowel Shift in more advanced sub-types ([ɛə] ← /æ/ ← /ɑ/ ← /ɔ/ ← /ʌ/ ← /ɛ/)
- GOAT is [oʊ~ʌo]
Midland
The Midland dialect is defined by:
- Cot–caught merger is in transition
- /aɪ/ may be [a], often only before /l/, /m/, /n/, or /ɹ/
- /aʊ/ is [æɵ~æo]
- /oʊ/ is [əʊ~ɵʊ]
WPA
The Western Pennsylvania dialect, including its advanced Pittsburgh sub-type, is defined by:
- Cot–caught merger to [ɒ~ɔ], the triggering event for the Pittsburgh Chain Shift in the city itself ([ɒ~ɔ] ← /ɑ/ ← /ʌ/) but no trace of the Canadian Shift
- /oʊ/ is [əʊ~ɞʊ]
- Full–fool–foal merger to [ʊl~ʊw]
- Specifically in Greater Pittsburgh, /aʊ/ is [aʊ~a], particularly before /l/ and /r/, and in unstressed function words
Southern
The Southern dialects, including several sub-types, are defined by:
- Variable rhoticity (parts of Louisiana are still non-rhotic, even among younger people)
- No cot–caught merger: the cot vowel is [ɑ] and caught vowel is [ɑɒ]
- /aɪ/ is [a] at least before /b/, /d/, /ɡ/, /v/, or /z/, or word-finally, and potentially elsewhere, the triggering event for the Southern Shift ([a] ← /aɪ/ ← /eɪ/ ← /i/)
- "Southern drawl" may break short front vowels into gliding vowels: /æ/ → [ɛ(j)ə]; /ɛ/ → [ɪ(j)ə]; /ɪ/ → [i(j)ə]
- MOUTH is [æo], the triggering event for the Back Upglide Shift in more advanced sub-types ([æo] ← /aʊ/ ← /ɔ/ ← /ɔɪ/)
- GOAT is [əʉ~əʊ]
Mid-Atlantic
The Mid-Atlantic ("Delaware Valley") dialect, including Philadelphia and Baltimore sub-types, is defined by:
- No cot–caught merger: the cot vowel is [ɑ̈~ɑ] and caught vowel is [ɔə~ʊə]; this severe distinction is the triggering event for the Back Vowel Shift before /r/ (ʊr ← /ɔ(r)/ ← /ɑr/)
- Unique Mid-Atlantic /æ/ split system: the bad vowel is [eə] and sad vowel is [æ]
- GOAT is [əʊ]
- MOUTH is [ɛɔ]
- No Mary–marry–merry merger
NYC
The New York City dialect (with New Orleans English an intermediate sub-type between NYC and Southern) is defined by:
- No cot–caught merger: the cot vowel is [ɑ̈~ɑ] and caught vowel is [ɔə~ʊə]; this severe distinction is the triggering event for the Back Vowel Shift before /r/ (/ʊə/ ← /ɔ(r)/ ← /ɑr/)
- Non-rhoticity or variable rhoticity
- Unique New York City /æ/ split system: the bad vowel is [eə] and bat vowel is [æ]
- GOAT is [oʊ~ʌʊ]
- No Mary–marry–merry merger
- father–bother not necessarily merged
ENE
Eastern New England dialect, including Maine and Boston sub-types (with Rhode Island English an intermediate sub-type between ENE and NYC), is defined by:
- Cot–caught merger to [ɒ~ɑ] (lacking only in Rhode Island)
- Non-rhoticity or variable rhoticity
- MOUTH is [ɑʊ~äʊ]
- GOAT is [oʊ~ɔʊ]
- GOOSE is [u]
- Commonly, the starting points of /aɪ/ and /aʊ/ in a raised position when before voiceless consonants: [əɪ~ʌɪ] and [əʊ~ʌʊ], respectively
- Possibly no Mary–marry–merry merger
- No father–bother merger (except in Rhode Island): the father vowel is [a~ɑ̈] and bother vowel is [ɒ~ɑ]

The major regional dialects of Canadian English (each designated in all capital letters), as demarcated primarily by Labov et al.'s The Atlas of North American English, as well as the related Telsur Project's regional maps.

All regional Canadian English dialects, unless specifically stated otherwise, are rhotic, with the father–bother merger, cot–caught merger, and pre-nasal "short a" tensing. The broadest regional dialects include:

Standard Canadian
The Standard Canadian dialect, including its most advanced Inland Canadian sub-type and others, is defined by:
- Cot–caught merger to [ɒ], the triggering event for the Canadian Shift in more advanced sub-types ([ɒ] ← /ɑ/ ← /æ/ ← /ɛ/)
- /æ/ is raised to [ɛ] or even [e(ɪ)] when before /ɡ/
- Especially in Inland Canadian, beginnings of /aɪ/ and /aʊ/ in a raised position when before voiceless consonants: [əɪ~ʌɪ] and [əʊ~ʌʊ], respectively; /aʊ/ is otherwise [äʊ~ɑʊ]; and /eɪ/ approaches [e]
- START is [ɑɹ~ʌɹ]
- GOAT is [oʊ]
- GOOSE is [ʉu], except before /l/ where it is [u].
Atlantic Canadian
The Atlantic Canadian ("Maritimer") dialect, including Cape Breton, Lunenburg, and Newfoundland sub-types, is defined by:
- Cot–caught merger to [ɑ̈], but with no trace of the Canadian Shift
- START is [ɐɹ~əɹ]
- GOAT is [oʊ]

==== Chart of regional accents ====
Accent	Most populous urban center	Rhoticity	Strong /aʊ/ fronting	/aʊ/ raising before voiceless consonants	Strong /oʊ/ fronting	Strong /u/ fronting	Strong /ɑ/ fronting before /r/	LOT more fronted than STRUT	Father-bother merger	Cot–caught merger	Mary–marry–merry merger	Coral–choral merger	Pin–pen merger	/æ/ raising system	Chain shift
Atlantic Canadian	Halifax, NS	Yes	Mixed	Yes	No	Yes	Yes	No	Yes	Yes	Yes	Yes	No	Pre-nasal (mixed)	none
Inland Northern	Chicago, IL	Yes	No	No	No	No	Yes	Yes	Yes	No	Yes	Yes	No	General or Pre-nasal	Northern Cities
Mid-Atlantic	Philadelphia, PA	Yes	Yes	No	Yes	Yes	No	Mixed	Yes	No	No	No	No	Split	Back Vowel
Midland	Indianapolis, IN	Yes	Yes	No	Yes	Yes	No	No	Yes	Mixed	Yes	Yes	Mixed	Pre-nasal	none
New Orleans	New Orleans, LA	No	Yes	No	Yes	Yes	No	No	Yes	No	No	No	No	Split	Back Vowel & Southern
New York City	New York City, NY	No	Yes	No	No	No	No	Mixed	Mixed	No	No	No	No	Split	Back Vowel
North-Central	Fargo, ND	Yes	No	Mixed	No	No	Yes	Yes	Yes	Yes	Yes	Yes	No	General or Pre-nasal & -velar	none
Northeastern New England	Boston, MA	No	No	Yes	No	No	Yes	No	No	Yes	Mixed	No	No	Pre-nasal	none
Rhode Island	Providence, RI	No	No	Yes	No	No	No	Yes	Yes	No	No	No	No	Pre-nasal	Back Vowel
Southern	Dallas, TX	Mixed	Yes	No	Yes	Yes	No	No	Yes	Mixed	Yes	Mixed	Yes	Southern	Southern & Back Upglide
Standard Canadian	Toronto, ON	Yes	No	Yes	No	Yes	No	No	Yes	Yes	Yes	Yes	No	Pre-nasal & -velar	Low-back
Western	Los Angeles, CA	Yes	No	No	Mixed	Yes	No	No	Yes	Yes	Yes	Yes	No	Pre-nasal	Low-back
Western Pennsylvania	Pittsburgh, PA	Yes	Yes	No	Yes	Yes	No	No	Yes	Yes	Yes	Yes	No	Pre-nasal	Pittsburgh

=== Alternative classifications ===
Combining information from the phonetic research through interviews of Labov et al. in the ANAE (2006) and the phonological research through surveys of Vaux (2004), Hedges (2017) performed a latent class analysis (cluster analysis) to generate six clusters, each with American English features that naturally occurred together and each expected to match up with one of these six broad U.S. accent regions: the North, the South, the West, New England, the Midland, and the Mid-Atlantic (including New York City). The results showed that the accent regions/clusters were largely consistent with those outlined in the ANAE.

The defining particular pronunciations of particular words that have more than an 86% likelihood of occurring in a particular cluster are: pajamas with either the phoneme /æ/ or the phoneme /ɑ/; coupon with either /ju/ or /u/; Monday with either /eɪ/ or /i/; Florida with either /ɔ/ or other possibilities (such as /ɑ/); caramel with either two or three syllables; handkerchief with either /ɪ/ or /i/; lawyer as either /ˈlɔɪ.ər/ or /ˈlɔ.jər/; poem with either one or two syllables; route with either /u/ or /aʊ/; mayonnaise with either two or three syllables; and been with either /ɪ/ or other possibilities (such as /ɛ/). The parenthetical words indicate that the likelihood of their pronunciation occurs overwhelmingly in a particular region (well over 50% likelihood) but does not meet the >86% threshold set by Hedges (2017) for what necessarily defines one of the six regional accents. Blank boxes in the chart indicate regions where neither pronunciation variant particularly dominates over the other; in some of these instances, the data simply may be inconclusive or unclear.

Presumed accent region (cluster)	pajamas	coupon	Monday	Florida	caramel	handkerchief	lawyer	poem	route	mayonnaise	been
North	/æ/	/ju/	/eɪ/	/ɔ/	2 syll.	(/ɪ/)	(/ˈlɔɪ.ər/)		/aʊ/		/ɛ/
South	/ɑ/	(/ju/)	(/eɪ/)	(/ɔ/)	3 syll.	/ɪ/	/ˈlɔ.jər/	2 syll.	/aʊ/		(/ɪ/)
West	/ɑ/★	(/u/)	/eɪ/	/ɔ/	2 syll.	/ɪ/	/ˈlɔɪ.ər/	(2 syll.)	/aʊ/		(/ɪ/)
New England	/ɑ/	(/u/)	/eɪ/	(/ɔ/)	3 syll.		/ˈlɔɪ.ər/	(2 syll.)	/u/	3 syll.	/ɪ/
Midland	/æ/	/u/	/eɪ/	/ɔ/	2 syll.		/ˈlɔɪ.ər/★	(2 syll.)	/aʊ/		/ɪ/
Mid-Atlantic and NYC	/ɑ/	/u/	/eɪ/	/ɑ/	3 syll.	/ɪ/	/ˈlɔɪ.ər/	(2 syll.)	/u/	(3 syll.)	/ɪ/

★ Hedges (2017) acknowledges that the two pronunciations marked by this star are discrepancies of her latent class analysis, since they conflict with Vaux (2004)'s surveys. Conversely, the surveys show that /æ/ is the much more common vowel for pajamas in the West, and /ˈlɔɪ.ər/ and /ˈlɔ.jər/ are in fact both common variants for lawyer in the Midland.

=== General American ===
General American is an umbrella accent of American English perceived by many Americans to be "neutral" and free of regional characteristics. A General American accent is not a specific well-defined standard English in the way that Received Pronunciation (RP) has historically been the standard prestigious variant of the English language in England; rather, accents with a variety of features can all be perceived by Americans as "General American" so long as they lack certain sociolinguistically salient features: namely, that is, lacking regional features (such as R-dropping, which usually identifies an American speaker as being from the East Coast or South), ethnic features (such as the "clear L" sound, which often identifies speakers as being Hispanic), or socioeconomic features (such as th-stopping, which often identifies speakers of a lower-class background).

== Canada and Western United States ==
The English dialect region encompassing the Western United States and Canada is the largest one in North America and also the one with the fewest distinctive phonological features. This can be attributed to the fact that the West is the region most recently settled by English speakers, and so there has not been sufficient time for the region either to develop highly distinctive innovations or to split into strongly distinct dialectological subregions. The main phonological features of the Western U.S. and Canada are a completed cot-caught merger, a backed GOAT vowel (like the Northern U.S.), and a fronted GOOSE vowel (like the Southern U.S.).

=== Atlantic Canada ===
The accents of Atlantic Canada are more marked than the accents of the whole rest of English-speaking Canada. English of this region broadly includes /ɑ/ fronting before /r/ and full Canadian raising, but no Canadian Shift (the vowel shift documented in Standard Canadian English).

=== Inland Canada ===
All of Canada, except the Atlantic Provinces and French-speaking Québec, speaks Standard Canadian English: the relatively uniform variety of North American English native to inland and western Canada. The vowel [ɛ] is raised and diphthongized to [ɛɪ] or [eɪ] and [æ] as [eɪ] all before /ɡ/ and /ŋ/, merging words like leg and lag [leɪɡ]; tang is pronounced [teɪŋ].

The cot–caught merger to [ɒ] creates a hole in the short vowel sub-system and triggers a sound change known as the Canadian Shift, mainly found in Ontario, English-speaking Montreal, and further west, and led by Ontarians and women; it involves the front lax vowels /æ/, /ɛ/, /ɪ/. The /æ/ of TRAP is retracted to [a] (except before nasals, where it is raised and diphthongized to [eə]), then /ɛ/ (DRESS) and /ɪ/ (KIT) are lowered in the direction of [æ] and [ɛ] and/or retracted; the exact trajectory of the shift is still disputed.

Increasing numbers of Canadians have a feature called "Canadian raising", in which the nucleus of the diphthongs /aɪ/ and /aʊ/ are more "raised" before voiceless consonants. Thus for Canadians, word pairs like pouter/powder ([ˈpɐʊɾɚ] versus [ˈpaʊɾɚ]) and rider/writer are pronounced differently.

=== Pacific Northwest ===
The English of the Pacific Northwest, a region extending from British Columbia south into the Northwestern United States (particularly Washington and Oregon), is closely linguistically related to that of Inland Canada and that of California.

Like in Inland Canada, before /g/, /ɛ/ and /æ/ are raised, and /eɪ/ is lowered, sometimes leading to three-way merger. Canadian raising of /aɪ/ exists throughout the region, but the raising of /aʊ/ is more restricted to Canadian part. The Canadian Shift was observed in Vancouver independently of the shift further east, and it has now spread throughout the region. In Oregon, a split in /oʊ/ occurs where it fronts except before /l/ and nasals, similar to California.

=== California ===
California, the most populated U.S. state, has been documented as having some notable new subsets of Western U.S. English. Some youthful urban Californians possess a vowel shift partly identical to the Canadian shift in its backing or lowering of each front vowel one space in the mouth. Before /ŋ/, /ɪ/ is raised to [i], so king has the same vowel as keen rather than kin. Before /ŋ/ /æ/ may be identified with the phoneme /eɪ/, so rang is pronounced with the same vowel as ray. Elsewhere /æ/ is lowered in the direction of [a], /ɛ/ is lowered towards [æ] (to someone without the shift, pet can sound like pat), and /ɪ/ is lowered towards [ɛ], (pit can sound like pet), identically to the Canadian shift. In addition, /ʊ/ is moving towards [ʌ], so put sounds more like putt. /ʌ/ is fronted towards [ɛ], so putt can sound slightly similar to pet. The vowels /u/ and /oʊ/ (GOOSE and GOAT) may be more fronted, i.e. [ʉ] and [ɵʉ]. The pin–pen merger is complete in Bakersfield and rural areas of the Central Valley, and speakers in Sacramento either perceive or produce an approximation of this merger.

== Greater New York City ==
As in Eastern New England, the accents of New York City, Long Island, and adjoining New Jersey cities are traditionally non-rhotic, while other greater New York area varieties falling under the same sweeping dialect are usually rhotic or variably rhotic. Metropolitan New York shows the back GOAT and GOOSE vowels of the North, but a fronted MOUTH vowel. The vowels of cot [kɑ̈t] and caught [kɔət] are distinct; in fact the New York dialect has perhaps the highest realizations of /ɔ/ in North American English, even approaching [oə] or [ʊə]. Furthermore, the father vowel is traditionally kept distinct from either vowel, resulting in a three "lot-palm-father distinction".

The r-colored vowel of cart is back and often rounded [kɒt], and not fronted as it famously is in Boston. New York City and its surrounding areas are also known for a complicated short-a split into lax [æ] versus tense [eə], so that words, for example, like cast, calf, and cab have a different, higher, tenser vowel sound than cat, catch, and cap. The New York accent is well attested in American movies and television shows, often exaggerated, particularly in movies and shows about American mobsters from the area. Though it is sometimes known as a "Bronx" or "Brooklyn accent", no research has confirmed differences of accent between the city's boroughs.

== Northern and North-Central United States ==
One vast super-dialectal area commonly identified by linguists is "the North", usually meaning New England, inland areas of the Mid-Atlantic states, and the North-Central States. There is no cot–caught merger in the North around the Great Lakes and southern New England, although the merger is in progress in the North-bordering Midland and is completed in northern New England, including as far down the Atlantic coast as Boston. The western portions of the North may also show a transitioning or completing cot-caught merger. The diphthong /aʊ/ is [aʊ~äʊ], and /oʊ/ remains a back vowel, as does /u/ after non-coronal consonants (unlike the rest of the country). Indeed, in part of the North (much of Wisconsin and Minnesota), /u/ remains back in all environments. Where the Southeast has /ɔ/ the single word on, the North has /ɑ/. The Canadian raising of /aɪ/ (to [ʌɪ]) before voiceless consonants occurs is common in the North, and is becoming more common elsewhere in North America.

=== North ===
The traditional and linguistically conservative North (as defined by the Atlas of North American English) includes /ɑ/ being often raised or fronted before /r/, or both, as well as a firm resistance to the cot-caught merger (though possibly weakening in dialects reversing the fronting of /ɑ/). Maintaining these two features, but also developing several new ones, a younger accent of the North is now predominating at its center, around the Great Lakes and away from the Atlantic coast: the Inland North. Old money Northerners specifically born in the 19th and early 20th centuries often spoke with their own distinct accent.

==== Inland North ====
This map shows the approximate extent of the Northern Cities Vowel Shift, and thus the approximate area where the Inland North dialect predominates. Note that the region surrounding Erie, Pennsylvania is excluded.

The Inland North is a dialect region once considered the home of "standard Midwestern" speech that was the basis for General American in the mid-20th century. However, the Inland North dialect has been modified in the mid-1900s by the Northern Cities Vowel Shift (NCS), which is now the region's main outstanding feature, though it has been observed to be reversing at least in some areas, in particular with regards to /æ/ raising before non-nasal consonants and /ɑ/ fronting. The Inland North is centered on the area on the U.S. side of the Great Lakes, most prominently including central and western New York State (including Syracuse, Binghamton, Rochester, and Buffalo), much of Michigan's Lower Peninsula (Detroit, Grand Rapids), Toledo, Cleveland, Chicago, Gary, and southeastern Wisconsin (Milwaukee, Racine, Kenosha), but broken up by the city of Erie, whose accent today is non-Inland Northern and even Midland-like. The NCS itself is not uniform throughout the Inland North; it is most advanced in Western New York and Michigan, and less developed elsewhere. The NCS is a chain shift involving movements of six vowel phonemes: the raising, tensing, and diphthongization of /æ/ towards [ɪə] in all environments (cat being pronounced more like "kyat"), then the fronting of /ɑ/ to [a] (cot sounding like cat), then the lowering of /ɔ/ towards [ɑ] (caught sounding like cot, but without the two merging due to the previous step), then the backing and sometimes lowering of /ɛ/, toward either [ə] or [æ], then the backing and rounding of /ʌ/ towards [ɔ], so that (cut sounding like caught), then lastly the lowering and backing of /ɪ/ (but without any pin–pen merger).

=== New England ===
New England does not form a single unified dialect region, but rather houses as few as four native varieties of English, with some linguists identifying even more. Only Southwestern New England (Connecticut and western Massachusetts) neatly fits under the aforementioned definition of "the North". Otherwise, speakers, namely of Eastern New England, show very unusual other qualities. All of New England has a nasal short-a system, meaning that the short-a vowel most strongly raises before nasal consonants, as in much of the rest of the country.

==== Northeastern New England ====
The local and historical dialect of the coastal portions of New England, sometimes called Eastern New England English, now only encompasses Northeastern New England: Maine, New Hampshire (some of whose urban speakers are retreating from this local accent), and eastern Massachusetts (including Greater Boston). The accents spoken here share the Canadian raising of /aɪ/ as well as often /aʊ/, but they also possess the cot-caught merger, which is not associated with rest of "the North". Most famously, Northern New England accents (with the exception of Northwestern New England, much of southern New Hampshire, and Martha's Vineyard) are often non-rhotic. Some Northeastern New England accents are unique in North America for having resisted what is known as father–bother merger: in other words, the stressed vowel phonemes of father and bother remain distinct as /a/ and /ɒ/, so that the two words do not rhyme as they do in most American accents. Many Eastern New England speakers also once had a class of words with "broad a"—that is, /a/ as in father in words that in most accents contain /æ/, such as bath, half, and can't, similar to their pronunciation in London and southern England. The distinction between the vowels of horse and hoarse is maintained in traditional non-rhotic New England accents as [hɒs] for horse (with the same vowel as cot and caught) vs. [hoəs] for hoarse, though the horse–hoarse merger is certainly on the rise in the region today. The /æ/ phoneme has highly distinct allophones before nasal consonants. /ɑ/ fronting is usual before /r/.

==== Rhode Island ====
Rhode Island, dialectally identified as "Southeastern New England", is sometimes grouped with the Eastern New England dialect region, both by the dialectologists of the mid–20th century and in certain situations by the Atlas of North American English; it shares Eastern New England's traditional non-rhoticity (or "R Dropping"). A key linguistic difference between Rhode Island and the rest of the Eastern New England, however, is that Rhode Island is subject to the father–bother merger and yet neither the cot–caught merger nor /ɑ/ fronting before /r/. Indeed, Rhode Island shares with New York and Philadelphia an unusually high and back allophone of /ɔ/ (as in caught), even compared to other communities that do not have the cot–caught merger. In the Atlas of North American English, the city of Providence (the only Rhode Island community sampled by the Atlas) is also distinguished by having the backest realizations of /u/, /oʊ/, and /aʊ/ in North America. Therefore, Rhode Island English aligns in some features more with Boston English and other features more with New York City English.

==== Western New England ====
Recognized by research since the 1940s is the linguistic boundary between Eastern and Western New England, the latter settled from the Connecticut and New Haven colonies, rather than the Massachusetts Bay and Plymouth colonies. Western New Englanders settled most of upstate New York and the Inland North. Dialectological research has revealed some phonological nuances separating a Northwestern and Southwestern New England accent. Vermont, sometimes dialectally identified as "Northwestern New England", has the full cot-caught merger and /ɑ/ fronting before /r/ of Boston or Maine English, and yet none of the other marked features of Eastern New England, nor much evidence of the NCS, which is more robustly documented, though still variable, in Southwestern New England. Rhoticity predominates in all of Western New England, as does the father–bother merger of the rest of the nation. Southwestern New England merely forms a "less strong" extension of the Inland North dialect region, and it centers on Connecticut and western Massachusetts. It shows the same general phonological system as the Inland North, including variable elements of Northern Cities Vowel Shift (NCS)—for instance, an /æ/ that is somewhat higher and tenser than average, an /ɑ/ that is fronter than /ʌ/, and so on. The cot–caught merger is approximated in western Massachusetts but usually still resisted in Connecticut. The "tail" of Connecticut may have some character diffused from New York City English.

=== North Central ===
The North Central or Upper Midwest dialect region of the United States extends from the Upper Peninsula of Michigan westward across northern Minnesota and North Dakota into the middle of Montana. Although the Atlas of North American English does not include the North Central region as part of the North proper, it shares all of the features listed above as properties of the North as a whole. The North Central is a linguistically conservative region; it participates in few of the major ongoing sound changes of North American English. Its /oʊ/ (GOAT) and /eɪ/ (FACE) vowels are frequently even monophthongs: [o] and [e], respectively. The movie Fargo, which takes place in the North Central region, famously features strong versions of this accent. Unlike most of the rest of the North, the cot–caught merger is prevalent in the North Central region. Like in Canada, /æ/ TRAP is raised before /g/. In addition, some speakers will show NCS features, like /æ/ TRAP raising towards [ɛə] and /ɑ/ LOT fronting towards [ä].

== Southeastern United States ==
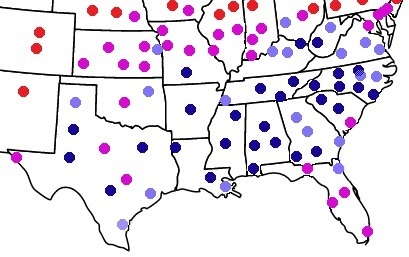
Blue represents major cities of the Southern accent; darker blue represents cities with the strongest features of this accent. Purple represents definitively non-Southern accents (mostly Midland accents), which together with the Southern accent fall under a "Southeastern super-region" (defined in this section). Red represents cities outside of that super-region.

The 2006 Atlas of North American English identifies a "Southeastern super-region", in which all accents of the Southern States, as well as accents all along their regional margins, constitute a vast area of recent linguistic unity in certain respects: namely, the movement of four vowel sounds (those in the words GOOSE, STRUT, GOAT, and MOUTH) towards the center or front of the mouth, all of which is notably different from the accents of the Northern United States.

Essentially all of the modern-day Southern dialects, plus dialects marginal to the South (some even in geographically and culturally "Northern" states), are thus considered a subset of this super-region: (Note: The only notable exceptions of the South being a subset of the "Southeastern super-region" are two Southern metropolitan areas, described as such because they participate in Stage 1 of the Southern Vowel Shift, but lack the other defining Southeastern features: Savannah, Georgia and Amarillo, Texas.) the whole American South, the southern half of the Mid- and South Atlantic regions, and a transitional Midland dialect area between the South and the North, comprising parts of Oklahoma, Kansas, Missouri, southeastern Nebraska, southern Illinois, southern Indiana, and southern Ohio. These are the minimal necessary features that identify a speaker from the Southeastern super-region:

- Fronting of /aʊ/ and /oʊ/: The gliding vowels /aʊ/ (as in cow or ouch) and /oʊ/ (as in goat or bone) both start considerably forward in the mouth, approximately [ɛɔ~æɒ] and [ɜu], respectively. /oʊ/ may even end in a very forward position—something like [ɜy~œʏ]. However, this fronting does not occur in younger speakers before /l/ (as in goal or colt) or before a syllable break between two vowels (as in going or poet), in which /oʊ/ remains back in the mouth as [ɔu~ɒu].
- Lacking or transitioning cot–caught merger: The historical distinction between the two vowels sounds /ɔ/ and /ɒ/, in words like caught and cot or stalk and stock is mainly preserved. In much of the South during the 1900s, there was a trend to lower the vowel found in words like stalk and caught, often with an upglide, so that the most common result today is the gliding vowel [ɑɒ]. However, the cot–caught merger is becoming increasingly common throughout the United States, thus affecting Southeastern (even some Southern) dialects, towards a merged vowel [ɑ]. In the South, this merger, or a transition towards this merger, is especially documented in central, northern, and (particularly) western Texas.

The merger of pin and pen in Southern American English. In the purple areas, the merger is complete for most speakers. Note the exclusion of the New Orleans area, Southern Florida, and of the Lowcountry of South Carolina and Georgia. The purple area in California consists of the Bakersfield and Kern County area, where migrants from the south-central states settled during the Dust Bowl. There is also debate as to whether or not Austin, Texas is an exclusion. Based on Labov, Ash & Boberg (2006:68).

- Pin–pen merger in transition: The vowels [ɛ] and [ɪ] often merge when before nasal consonants, so that pen and pin, for instance, or hem and him, are pronounced the same, as pin or him, respectively. The merger is towards the sound [ɪ]. This merger is now firmly completed throughout the Southern dialect region; however, it is not found in some vestigial varieties of the older South, and other geographically Southern U.S. varieties that have eluded the Southern Vowel Shift, such as the Yat dialect of New Orleans or the anomalous dialect of Savannah, Georgia. The pin–pen merger has also spread beyond the South in recent decades and is now found in isolated parts of the West and the southern Midwest as well.
- Rhoticity: Dropping of postvocalic r (and, in some dialects, intervocalic r) was historically widespread in the South, particularly in former plantation areas. This phenomenon, non-rhoticity, was considered prestigious across the nation before World War II, after which the social perception reversed. Rhoticity (sometimes called r-fulness), in which all or most r sounds are pronounced, historically found only in the Midland, Appalachia, and some other Southeastern regions, has now become dominant throughout almost the entire Southeastern super-region, as in most American English, and even more so among younger and female white Southerners; major exceptions are among Black or African American Southerners, whose modern vernacular dialect continues to be mostly non-rhotic as well as most of southern Louisiana, where non-rhotic accents still dominate. The sound quality of the Southeastern r is the distinctive "bunch-tongued r", produced by strongly constricting the root and/or midsection of the tongue.

=== Midland ===
A band of the United States from Pennsylvania west to the Great Plains is what twentieth-century linguists identified as the "Midland" dialect region, though this dialect's same features are now reported in certain other pockets of the country too (for example, some major cities in Texas, all in Central and South Florida, and particular cities that are otherwise Southern). In older and traditional dialectological research, focused on lexicology (vocabulary) rather than phonology (accent), the Midland was divided into two discrete geographical subdivisions: the "North Midland" that begins north of the Ohio River valley area and, south of that, the "South Midland" dialect area. The North Midland region stretches from east-to-west across central and southern Ohio, central Indiana, central Illinois, Iowa, and northern Missouri, as well as Nebraska and Kansas where it begins to blend into the West. The South Midland dialect region follows the Ohio River in a generally southwesterly direction, moving across from Kentucky, Tennessee, southern Indiana, and southern Illinois to southern Missouri, Arkansas, southeastern Kansas, and Oklahoma, west of the Mississippi River. The distinction between a "North" versus "South Midland" was discarded in the 2006 Atlas of North American English, in which the former "North Midland" is now simply called "the Midland" (and argued to have a "stronger claim" to a General American accent than any other region) and the "South Midland" is considered merely as the upper portion of "the South"; this ANAE reevaluation is primarily on the basis of phonology. The Midland is characterized by having a distinctly fronter realization of the /oʊ/ phoneme (as in boat) than many other American accents, particularly those of the North; the phoneme is frequently realized with a central nucleus, approximating [əʊ]. Likewise, /aʊ/ has a fronter nucleus than /aɪ/, approaching [æʊ]. Another feature distinguishing the Midland from the North is that the word on contains the phoneme /ɔ/ (as in caught) rather than /ɑ/ (as in cot). For this reason, one of the names for the North-Midland boundary is the "on line". However, since the twentieth century, this area is currently undergoing a vowel merger of the "short o" /ɑ/ (as in cot) and 'aw' /ɔ/ (as in caught) phonemes, known as the cot-caught merger. Many speakers show transitional forms of the merger. The /æ/ phoneme (as in cat) shows most commonly a so-called "continuous" distribution: /æ/ is raised and tensed toward [eə] before nasal consonants, as in much of the country.

==== Midland outside the Midland ====
Atlanta, Georgia has been characterized by a massive movement of non-Southerners into the area during the 1990s, leading the city to becoming hugely mixed in terms of dialect. Currently, /aɪ/ is variably monophthongized (as in the Southern U.S.); no complete cot-caught merger is reported; and the pin–pen merger is variable.

Charleston, South Carolina is an area where, today, most speakers have clearly conformed to a Midland regional accent, rather than any Southern accent. Charleston was once home to its own very locally-unique accent that encompassed elements of older British English while resisting Southern regional accent trends, perhaps with additional linguistic influence from French Huguenots, Sephardi Jews, and, due to Charleston's high concentration of African-Americans that spoke the Gullah language, Gullah African Americans. The most distinguishing feature of this now-dying accent is the way speakers pronounce the name of the city, to which a standard listener would hear "Chahlston", with a silent "r". Unlike Southern regional accents, Charlestonian speakers have never exhibited inglide long mid vowels, such as those found in typical Southern /aɪ/ and /aʊ/.

Central and South Florida show no evidence of any type of /aɪ/ glide deletion, Central Florida shows a pin–pen merger, and South Florida does not. Otherwise, Central and South Florida easily fit under the definition of the Midland dialect, including the cot-caught merger being transitional. In South Florida, particularly in and around Miami-Dade, Broward, and Monroe counties, a unique dialect, commonly called the "Miami accent", is widely spoken. The dialect first developed among second- or third-generation Hispanics, including Cuban-Americans, whose first language was English. Unlike the older Florida Cracker dialect, "Miami accent" is rhotic. It also incorporates a rhythm and pronunciation heavily influenced by Spanish (wherein rhythm is syllable-timed).

=== Mid-Atlantic States ===
The cities of the Mid-Atlantic States around the Philadelphia metropolitan area (South Jersey, southeastern Pennsylvania, northern Delaware, and eastern Maryland) are typically classified together, their speakers most popularly labelled as having a Philadelphia accent or a Baltimore accent. While Labov et al. state that the dialect could potentially be included in the Midland super-region, the dialect is not included in Midland proper as a result of distinct phonological features defining the dialect. The Mid-Atlantic split of /æ/ into two separate phonemes, similar to but not exactly the same as New York City English, is one major defining feature of the dialect region, as is a resistance to the Mary–marry–merry merger and cot-caught merger (a raising and diphthongizing of the "caught" vowel), and a maintained distinction between historical short o and long o before intervocalic /r/, so that, for example, orange, Florida, and horrible have a different stressed vowel than story and chorus; all of these features are shared between Mid-Atlantic American and New York City English. Other features include that water is sometimes pronounced [ˈwʊɾɚ], that is, with the vowel of wood; the single word on is pronounced /ɔn/ not /ɑn/, so that, as in the South and Midland (and unlike New York and the North) it rhymes with dawn rather than don; the /oʊ/ of goat and boat is fronted, so it is pronounced [əʊ], as in the advanced accents of the Midland and South. Canadian raising occurs for /aɪ/ (price) but not for /aʊ/ (mouth).

According to linguist Barbara Johnstone, migration patterns and geography affected the Philadelphia dialect's development, which was especially influenced by immigrants from Northern England, Scotland, and Northern Ireland.

=== South ===
The Southern United States is often dialectally identified as "The South," as in ANAE. There is still great variation between sub-regions in the South (see here for more information) and between older and younger generations. Southern American English as Americans popularly imagine began to take its current shape only after the beginning of the twentieth century. Some generalizations include: the conditional merger of [ɛ] and [ɪ] before nasal consonants, the pin–pen merger; the diphthong /aɪ/ becomes monophthongized to [a]; lax and tense vowels often merge before /l/. The South Midland dialect (now considered the upper portion of the Southern U.S. dialect and often not distinguished phonologically) follows the Ohio River in a generally southwesterly direction, moves across Arkansas and some of Oklahoma west of the Mississippi, and peters out in West Texas; it also includes some of North Florida, namely around Jacksonville. It most noticeably has the loss of the diphthong [aɪ], which becomes [a]. It also shows fronting of initial vowel of /aʊ/ to [æʊ] (often lengthened and prolonged) yielding [æːʊ]; nasalization of vowels, esp. diphthongs, before [n]; raising of /æ/ to [e]; can't → cain't, etc.; fully rhoticity, unlike classical coastal varieties of older Southern American English, now mostly declined. In the Southern Vowel Shift of the early 1900s up to the present, [ɪ] moves to become a high front vowel, and [ɛ] to become a mid front unrounded vowel. In a parallel shift, the /i/ and /eɪ/ relax and become less front; the back vowels /u/ in boon and /oʊ/ in code shift considerably forward to [ʉ] and [ɞ], respectively; and, the open back unrounded vowel /ɑ/ in card shifts upward towards [ɔ] as in board, which in turn moves up towards the old location of /u/ in boon. This particular shift probably does not occur for speakers with the cot–caught merger. The lowering movement of the Southern Vowel Shift is also accompanied by a raising and "drawling" movement of vowels. The term Southern drawl has been used to refer to the diphthongization/triphthongization of the traditional short front vowels, as in the words pat, pet, and pit. these develop a glide up from their original starting position to [j], and then in some cases back down to schwa; thus: /æ/ → [æjə], /ɛ/ → [ɛjə], and /ɪ/ → [ɪjə].

==== Inland South and Texas South ====
The ANAE identifies two important, especially advanced subsets of the South in terms of their leading the Southern Vowel Shift (detailed above): the "Inland South" located in the southern half of Appalachia and the "Texas South," which only covers the north-central region of Texas (Dallas), Odessa, and Lubbock, but not Abilene, El Paso, or southern Texas (which have accents more like the Midland region). One Texan distinction from the rest of the South is that all Texan accents have been reported as showing a pure, non-gliding /ɔ/ vowel, and the identified "Texas South" accent, specifically, is at a transitional stage of the cot-caught merger; the "Inland South" accent of Appalachia, however, firmly resists the merger. Pronunciations of the Southern dialect in Texas may also show notable influence derived from an early Spanish-speaking population or from German immigrants.

=== Marginal Southeast ===
The following Southeastern super-regional locations fit cleanly into none of the aforementioned subsets of the Southeast, and may even be marginal-at-best members of the super-region itself:

Chesapeake and the Outer Banks (North Carolina) islands are enclaves of a traditional "Hoi Toider" dialect, in which /aɪ/ is typically backed and rounded. Many other features of phonological (and lexical) note exist here too; for example, Ocracoke, North Carolina shows no cot–caught merger and its monophthongs are diphthongized (up-gliding) before /ʃ/ and /tʃ/ and Smith Island, Maryland shows an /i/ that is diphthongized (like the South) and no happy tensing.

New Orleans, Louisiana has been home to a type of accent with parallels to the New York City accent reported for over a century. This variety of New Orleans English has been locally nicknamed "Yat" since at least the 1980s, from a traditional greeting "Where y'at" ("Where are you at?", meaning "How are you?"). The Yat/NYC parallels include the split of the historic short-a class into tense [eə] and lax [æ] versions, as well as pronunciation of cot and caught as [kɑ̈t] and [kɔət]. The stereotypical New York coil–curl merger of "toity-toid street" (33rd Street) used to be a common New Orleans feature as well, though it has mostly receded today. One of the most detailed phonetic depictions of an extreme "yat" accent of the early 20th century is found in the speech of the character Krazy Kat in the comic strip of the same name by George Herriman. Such extreme accents still be found in parts of Mid-City and the 9th ward, Jefferson Parish, as well as in St. Bernard Parish, just east of New Orleans. The novel A Confederacy of Dunces by John Kennedy Toole often employs the Yat accent.

Oklahoma City, Oklahoma, according to the ANAE's research, is not quite a member of the Midland dialect region. Rather, its features seem to be a blend of the Western and Midland dialects. The overview of ANAE's studied features for Oklahoma City speakers include a conservative /aɪ/, conservative /oʊ/, transitional cot-caught merger, and variable pin–pen merger.

Savannah, Georgia once had a local accent that is now "giving way to regional patterns" of the Midland. According to the ANAE, there is much transition in Savannah, and the following features are reported as inconsistent or highly variable in the city: the Southern phenomenon of /aɪ/ being monophthongized, non-rhoticity, /oʊ/ fronting, the cot–caught merger, the pin–pen merger, and conservative /aʊ/ (which is otherwise rarely if ever reported in either the South or the Midland).

St. Louis, Missouri is historically one among several (North) Midland cities, but it is largely considered by ANAE to classify under blends of Inland North accents, with the Northern Cities Vowel Shift (NCS), and Midland accents. The "St. Louis Corridor" demonstrates this variability in speakers following a line formed by U.S. Route 66 in Illinois (now Interstate 55), going from Chicago southwest to St. Louis. This corridor of speakers cuts right through the center of what is otherwise the firmly documented Midland region. Older St. Louisans demonstrate a card-cord merger, so that "I-44" is pronounced like "I farty-four". St. Louis resists the cot–caught merger and middle-aged speakers show the most advanced stages of the NCS, while maintaining many of the other Midland features.

==== Western Pennsylvania ====
The dialect of the western half of Pennsylvania is like the Midland proper in many features, including the fronting of /oʊ/ and /aʊ/. The chief distinguishing feature of Western Pennsylvania as a whole is that the cot–caught merger is noticeably complete here, whereas it is still in progress in most of the Midland. The merger has also spread from Western Pennsylvania into adjacent West Virginia, historically in the South Midland dialect region. The city of Pittsburgh shows an especially advanced subset of Western Pennsylvania English, additionally characterized by a sound change that is unique in North America: the monophthongization of /aʊ/ to [a]. This is the source of the stereotypical Pittsburgh pronunciation of downtown as "dahntahn". Pittsburgh also features an unusually low allophone of /ʌ/ (as in cut); it approaches [ɑ] (/ɑ/ itself having moved out of the way and become a rounded vowel in its merger with /ɔ/).

== See also ==
- Accent (sociolinguistics)
- American English
- American English regional vocabulary
- Boontling
- California English
- Canadian English
- Chicano English
- English in New Mexico
- Hawaiian Pidgin
- Pacific Northwest English

== Bibliography ==
- Labov, William; Ash, Sharon; Boberg, Charles (2006), The Atlas of North American English, Berlin: Mouton-de Gruyter, pp. 187–208, ISBN 3-11-016746-8
- Shitara, Yuko (1993). "A survey of American pronunciation preferences". Speech Hearing and Language. 7: 201–32.
- Mencken, H. L. (1977) [1921]. The American Language: An Inquiry into the Development of English in the United States (4th ed.). New York: Knopf. ("Mencken, H.L. 1921. The American Language". Bartleby.com.)
- Rainey, Virginia (2004). Insiders' Guide: Salt Lake City (4 ed.). The Globe Pequot Press. ISBN 0-7627-2836-1.
- "Brigham Young University Linguistics Department Research Teams". Archived from the original on 2007-10-17.
- "BYU "Utah English" Research Team's Homepage".
- "Utahnics", segment on All Things Considered, National Public Radio February 16, 1997.
- Chambers, J. K. (1973). "Canadian raising". Canadian Journal of Linguistics. 18 (2): 113–35. doi:10.1017/S0008413100007350. S2CID 247196050.
- Dailey-O'Cain, J. (1997). "Canadian raising in a midwestern U.S. city". Language Variation and Change. 9 (1): 107–120. doi:10.1017/S0954394500001812. S2CID 146637083.
- Labov, William (1963). "The social motivation of a sound change". Word. 19 (3): 273–309. doi:10.1080/00437956.1963.11659799.
- Labov, William (2001). Principles of Linguistic Change: Social Factors. Malden, Mass.: Blackwell. ISBN 0-631-17916-X.
- Wells, John C. (1982). Accents of English. Cambridge: Cambridge University Press.
- McCarthy, John (1993). "A case of surface constraint violation". Canadian Journal of Linguistics. 38 (2): 169–95. doi:10.1017/S0008413100014730. S2CID 14047772.
- Metcalf, Allan A. (2000). How We Talk: American Regional English Today. Boston: Houghton Mifflin.
- The Speech Accent Archive. George Mason University. 22 September 2004.
- Van Riper, William (2014). "General American: An Ambiguity". In Harold Allen; Michael Linn (eds.). Dialect and Language Variation. Elsevier. ISBN 978-1-4832-9476-6.
- Walsh, M (February 28, 1995). Vermont Accent: Endangered Species?. Burlington Free Press. Archived from the original on 2009-07-25.
- Wolfram, Walt; Ward, Ben, eds. (2006). American Voices: How Dialects Differ from Coast to Coast. Malden, MA: Blackwell Publishing.
