= Yappin' Yinzers =

Plush doll line with exaggerated Pittsburgh mannerisms and speech patterns

- Type: Talking plush doll
- Invented by: Alex Kozak
- Company: Colloquial Enterprises, LLC
- Country: United States
- Availability: 2006–present
- Slogan: Pittsburghers with Personality
- Official website

Yappin' Yinzers is a line of talking plush dolls with exaggerated stereotypical Pittsburgh mannerisms and speech patterns, a personality type called Yinzer. They are designed to "represent the epitome of Yinzerdom"

Yappin' Yinzers were invented by Alex Kozak, a manager at software company called CombineNet. He is a native of Pittsburgh who grew up in West Homestead and Bethel Park, Pennsylvania. His parents are the children of Ukrainian immigrants. He graduated from Duquesne University.

Chipped Ham Sam was the first Yappin' Yinzer issued; he sports a mullet, jean shorts, and a Pittsburgh Steelers jersey. One of his recorded sayings in "I'm goin' dahn a sahside ta drink some arns 'n'at." Later, Nebby Debbie was added.

Kozak developed Yappin' Yinzers in 2006 after having a difficult time explaining the concept of "yinzer" to out-of-state business associates. He recorded the voices himself. By October 2007, the Yappin' Yinzers were available for sale at 30 locations. They cost $19.95. They have been on sale at the Heinz History Center. Within the first year, 3,500 were sold. Much of the interest came from Pittsburgh expatriates. As of January 2014, Pittsburgh Tribune-Review reported that the Yappin' Yinzers "continue to be big sellers."

Kozak has begun expanding the offerings to similar dolls across other American cities under the title of Talkin' Townies. In 2012, Colliquial Enterprises developed a second line of dolls based on stereotypical localized culture, this time Beantown Sully with Boston accent and mannerisms.

In her book Speaking Pittsburghese: The Story of a Dialect, Barbara Johnstone, Professor of Rhetoric at Carnegie Mellon University dedicated an entire section to explaining why Yappin' Yinzers represent "Characterological Figures" of the social identity of "yinzers."
