= New Jersey English =

Group of varieties of English spoken in New Jersey

New Jersey English refers to the diverse regional varieties of American English spoken across the U.S. state of New Jersey. Despite popular stereotypes in the media that there is a singular New Jersey accent, there are in fact several distinct accents native to New Jersey, none being confined only to New Jersey. Therefore, the term "New Jersey English" is diverse in meaning and often misleading, and it may refer to any of the following dialects of American English—most frequently to New York City English and Philadelphia English—or even to intermediate varieties that blend the features of these multiple dialects.

== African-American dialect ==
Working- and middle-class African Americans throughout New Jersey commonly speak African-American Vernacular English (AAVE), regardless of the area of the state in which they were raised. New Jersey AAVE commonly includes a distinction between the vowels of cot and caught as well as notable fronting of the MOUTH vowel.

== New York metropolitan dialect ==
New York City English, including the accent of greater New York City, is spoken in northeastern New Jersey, plus Monmouth County and other New Jersey counties in North Jersey or within the New York City metropolitan area. Therefore, the short-a system of these areas of New Jersey is most similar to the New York City split-a system, albeit with some variation. East of the Hackensack River and in Newark, William Labov finds the split-a system to occur with no more variation than in New York City proper. However, west of the Hackensack River, he finds that the normal function word constraint of New York City English is lost, and the open syllable constraint becomes variable. Furthermore, most of the New York metropolitan dialect heard in New Jersey is rhotic, or "r-pronouncing", although the speech of Newark as well as Jersey City (just across the Hudson River from New York City) may, by contrast, be non-rhotic, or "r-dropping".

== Northern dialect ==
Outside of the New York and Philadelphia metropolitan areas, regional English of North Jersey was classified as part of the broad Northern U.S. phonological region by The Atlas of North American English (ANAE) in 2006 and part of the Hudson Valley lexical region by Hans Kurath in 1949. According to the ANAE, the /uː/ vowel remains very far back in the mouth. Like Inland Northern English but unlike New York City English, the accent backs /ɛ/ and fronts /ɒ/ so that both vowels are centralized, distinguished from each other only by height. However, unlike the Inland Northern accent, this accent uses the nasal short-a system.

== Philadelphia metropolitan dialect ==
The regional dialect of the Mid-Atlantic States, in this case Philadelphia English specifically, is spoken in South Jersey and some parts of Central Jersey, including most of Ocean County. Generally, the closer a speaker is raised to the city of Philadelphia, the more features their idiolect will share with the sub-dialect of Philadelphia, such as the use of the term hoagie to refer to a submarine sandwich (or sub). In Vineland in South Jersey and in some areas of Central Jersey, a nasal short-a system has been reported (in which /æ/ is tensed only before a nasal consonant) rather than the defining Philadelphian split-a system otherwise typical of South Jersey.

== Bibliography ==
- Labov, William; Ash, Sharon; Boberg, Charles (2006). The Atlas of North American English. Berlin: Mouton de Gruyter. ISBN 3-11-016746-8.
