= Jagoff =

Derogatory slang term for someone who is stupid or inept

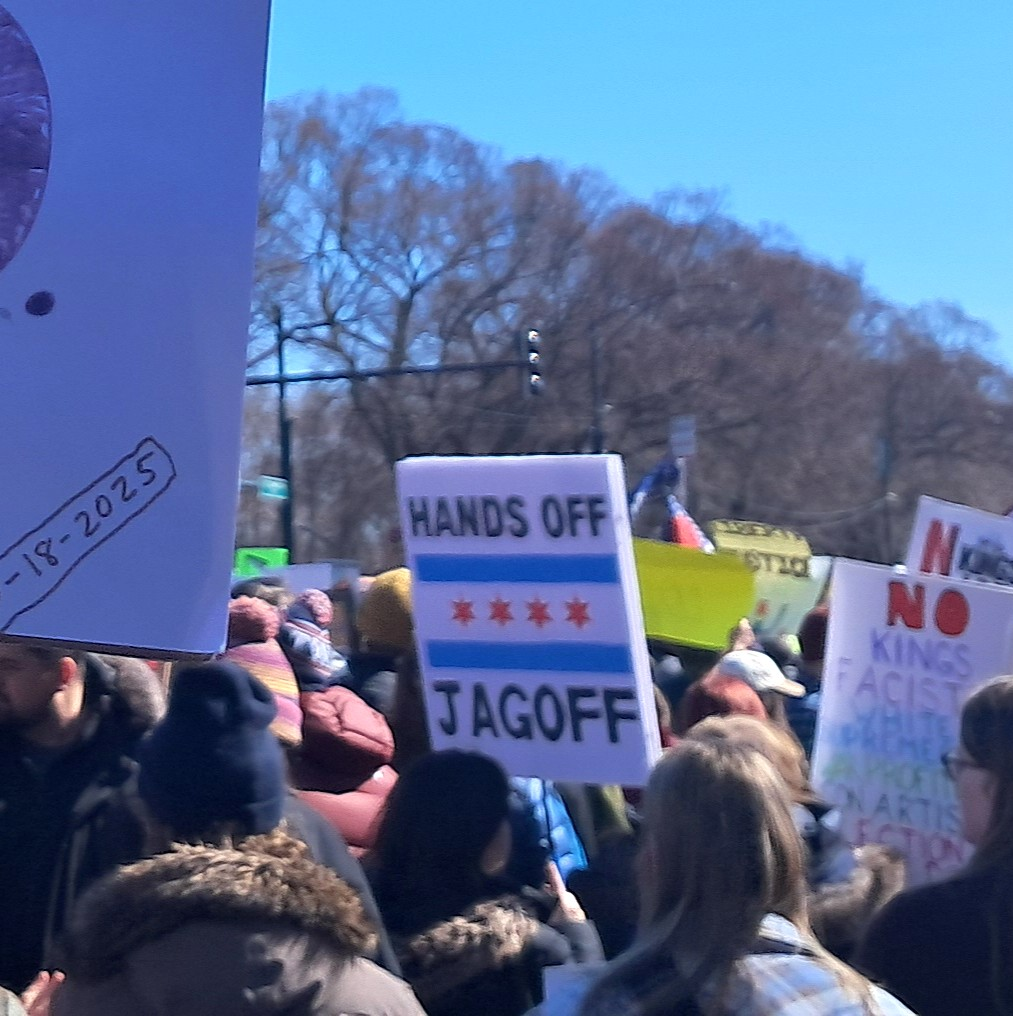
Protest sign in Chicago bearing the word jagoff

Jagoff or jag-off or the abbreviation jag is an American English derogatory slang term from Pittsburghese meaning a person who is a jerk, stupid or inept. It is most prominent in the Pittsburgh area and Pennsylvania in general, along with wide use in Chicago, particularly in the Irish taverns. The Dictionary of American Regional English defines the term as a "general term of disparagement". It is an archetypical Pittsburgh word, evoking feelings of delight among Pittsburgh expatriates. Despite the term's phonetic resemblance to jack off, the two possibly have different origins and jagoff, while derogatory or playful, is generally not seen as obscene among Pittsburghers and Chicagoans.

== Etymology ==
According to Barbara Johnstone, professor of English and linguistics at Carnegie Mellon University, the term has its roots in the northern British Isles, an area that supplied many immigrants to Pittsburgh. She says it is derived from the verb "to jag", meaning "to prick or poke", with an extended meaning of sharply changing direction or zig-zagging. This seems plausible since another Pittsburghese word used for thorn is ‘jagger’ and thorn bush is ‘jagger bush’. Johnstone said that among local Pittsburghers, "Nobody thinks of these derivatives of 'jag' as obscene".

The Oxford English Dictionary gives the term's etymology as "from jackoff, perhaps influenced by jag".

== Controversies over the term ==
In 2010, Pittsburgh native and coach of the Kentucky Wildcats men's basketball team, John Calipari, raised hackles in the media when he jokingly referred to fellow Pittsburgher John Buccigross as a "jagoff".

In 2012, David Shribman, a Massachusetts native and executive editor of the Pittsburgh Post-Gazette, issued a letter banning the use of the word "jagoff" anywhere in the newspaper. The decision was mocked by Chris Potter of the Pittsburgh City Paper, noting that Shribman's letter belied an utter lack of understanding of the actual etymology and history of the word, as he had confused it with the more base homophone, "jack off", common slang for masturbation. In response The Beaver County Times used some form of the term 19 times in a single article, suggesting that Shribman has "Jagoffphobia".
