= Yinzer =

Regional nickname for the people of Pittsburgh

Yinzer is a 20th-century term playing on the Pittsburghese second-person plural vernacular "yinz." The word is used among people who identify themselves with the city of Pittsburgh and its traditions.

== History ==
"Yinzer" (or "Yunzer") was historically used to identify the typical blue-collar people from the Pittsburgh region who often spoke with a heavy Pittsburghese accent. The term stems from the word yinz (or yunz), a second-person plural pronoun brought to the area by early Scottish-Irish immigrants. Over time, yinzer has been used by many Pittsburgh residents to self-identify, even if they don't speak with a thick accent.

The concept and use of the word gained popularity in the 21st century as the area's population loss slowed, and the city became a hub for revitalization. As the city gained note as a desirable place to live, more outsiders have moved or returned to the Pittsburgh metropolitan area. The term has taken on a connotation to identify someone who is either a lifelong Pittsburgher, or says a phrase or commits an act that could be identified as something a stereotypical Pittsburgher might do.
