= Philadelphia English =

Variety or dialect of American English

Philadelphia English or Delaware Valley English (linguasphere: 52-ABA-cga) is a variety or dialect of American English native to Philadelphia and extending throughout the city's metropolitan area, including southeastern Pennsylvania, South Jersey, northern Delaware (mainly New Castle), and northeastern Maryland. Apart from Philadelphia, the dialect is spoken in such cities as Camden, Wilmington, Reading, Vineland, and Atlantic City. Philadelphia English is one of the best-studied varieties of English, as Philadelphia's University of Pennsylvania was the home institution of pioneering sociolinguist William Labov. Philadelphia English shares certain features with New York City English and Midland American English. Philadelphia and Baltimore accents fall under what Labov described as a single Mid-Atlantic dialect, encompassing the middle of the Mid-Atlantic United States.

According to linguist Barbara Johnstone, migration patterns and geography affected the dialect's development, which was influenced by immigrants from Northern England, Scotland, and Northern Ireland. Today, a marked or "heavier" Philadelphia accent is most commonly found in Irish-American and Italian-American working-class neighborhoods.

== History ==
By the twentieth century, the Philadelphia and New York accents shared features not found elsewhere, including: a high /ɔ/ vowel, which helps to maintain a contrast between words like cot and caught; and a phonemic split of the short a vowel, /æ/, causing gas and gap to have different vowels sounds. Philadelphia's short a split appears to be a simplified variant of New York City's split.

Unlike New York City English, most speakers of Philadelphia English have always used a rhotic accent, meaning that the r sound is never "dropped".

Philadelphia accents from the late nineteenth century to the 1950s shared certain features of the regional accents of the American South and Midland: for example, in fronting /oʊ/, raising /aʊ/, and sometimes weakening /aɪ/. Philadelphians began developing their own entirely unique phonological features, remaining similar-sounding to New York City's English. Some higher-educated Philadelphians born since the last quarter of the twentieth century have been showing dialect levelling and more use of unmarked Northern American English (General American English) features. This demographic regularly replaces the traditional Philadelphia /æ/ split with the more General American tensing of /æ/ only before nasal consonants; this probably began when its members attended college.

As of today, "the most strongly supported generalization is that Philadelphia has moved away from its Southern heritage in favor of a Northern system, avoiding those forms that are most saliently associated with local phonology." In the city of Philadelphia proper, the dialect has evolved further, especially among younger residents, and the "White Philadelphian dialect" is now spoken by a numerical minority of all Philadelphians within the city of Philadelphia itself, though it remains strong throughout the Philadelphia metropolitan region.

Some media sources have referred to the Philadelphia dialect or Philadelphia accent spoken in Delaware County as “Delco English,” though no such distinction is made in linguistic sources.

== Linguistic features ==
=== Pronunciation ===
==== Vowels ====
The vowels in Philadelphia speech have shown volatility across the last century, as Labov's research has identified changes affecting over half of the vowel phonemes.

- THOUGHT vowel: A feature unique to Middle Atlantic speakers (including Philadelphians and New Yorkers) and southern New Englanders is the raising and diphthongization of /ɔ/, as in THOUGHT, to [oə] or even higher [ʊə]. The raised variants often appear as diphthongs with a centering glide. As a result, Philadelphia is resistant to the cot–caught merger. Labov's research suggests that this pattern of raising is essentially complete in Philadelphia and seems no longer to be an active change.
- LOT–CLOTH split: Similarly, the single word "on" has the vowel of "dawn" and not the same vowel as "don." Labov et al. regard this phenomenon as occurring not only in the Mid-Atlantic region but also in all regions south of a geographic boundary that they identify as the "ON line," which is significant because it distinguishes most varieties of Northern American English (in which on and Don are rhymes) from most varieties of Midland and Southern American English (in which on and dawn are rhymes).
- Southeastern vowel fronting: One of the features that Philadelphia shares with dialects of the whole Southeastern United States (but absent from most New York accents) is the fronting of a variety of vowels. This includes /oʊ/ and /u/; the resulting allophones are around [əʊ] and [ʉu], respectively. Generally, greater degrees of fronting are heard when the vowels appear in "free" positions (i.e., without a following consonant) than in "checked" positions (i.e., with a following consonant). Fronting does not occur in the context of following liquids leading to a significant difference between, e.g., goat and goal. The fronting of /oʊ/ and /u/ is well established in Philadelphia, though cross-generational data show that it remains an active change. Fronted nuclei in /aʊ/ are well established in Philadelphia speech as in New York. More recent research has noted a tendency among the middle-aged and younger generation of Philadelphians to raise the vowel, resulting in [ɛɔ]. /ʊ/, the vowel in foot, is sometimes fronted though not to the degree seen with /oʊ/ and /u/.
- Short-a split: As in New York and Baltimore accents, historical "short a" has split into two phonemes: lax /æ/ (as in bat) and tense /eə/ (as in bath). Their distribution in Philadelphia along with Baltimore, however, is different from that of New York City. Generally, in the Philadelphia–Baltimore system, the vowel /æ/ is tensed (towards [eə]) before the consonants /m/, /n/, /f/, /s/, and /θ/ in a closed syllable (so, for example, bats and baths do not have the same vowel sound, being pronounced [bæts] and [beəθs], respectively), and in any words directly inflectionally derived from root words with this split. Therefore, pass and passing use the tense [eə], but passage and passive use the lax [æ]. The lax and the tense reflexes of /æ/ are separate phonemes in these dialects, though largely predictable using the aforementioned rules. There are exceptions, however; the three words bad, mad, and glad become tense, and irregular verbs ending in "-an" or "-am" remain lax. [æ] can also be found in closed syllables in words where a vowel was recently elided closing the syllable such as camera, family, and catholic. The words mad (tense) and sad (lax) do not rhyme in Philadelphia or Baltimore, but do for New York City and all other English dialects. (In the Trenton area, an intermediate system is used, falling between the typical Mid-Atlantic and the New York City system.) Not all Philadelphians today have this feature and some are beginning to favor the more General American tensing of short a only before nasals (especially under the influence of youth trends and higher education); in fact, as a general rule, native Philadelphians consistently have that split system only if their own parents are native Philadelphians.

/æ/ raising in North American English
Following consonant	Example words	New York City, New Orleans	Baltimore, Philadelphia	Midland US, New England, Pittsburgh, Western US	Canada, Northern Mountain US	Minnesota, Wisconsin	Southern US	Great Lakes US
Non-prevocalic /m, n/	fan, lamb, stand	[ɛə] (Note: In New York City and Philadelphia, most function words (am, can, had, etc.) and some learned or less common words (alas, carafe, lad, etc.) have [æ].) (Note: In Philadelphia, the irregular verbs began, ran, and swam have [æ].)		[ɛə]	[ɛə]		[ɛə~ɛjə]	[ɛə]
Prevocalic /m, n/	animal, planet, Spanish	[æ]		[ɛə]	[ɛə]		[ɛə~ɛjə]	[ɛə]
/ŋ/	frank, language	[æ]		[ɛː~eɪ~æ]	[ɛː~ɛj]	[eː~ej]	[æ~æɛə]	[ɛə]
Prevocalic /ɡ/	dragon, magazine	[æ]		[æ] (Note: The untensed /æ/ may be lowered and retracted as much as [ä] in varieties affected by the Low-Back-Merger Shift, mainly predominant in Canada and the American West.)	[ɛː~ɛj]	[eː~ej]	[æ~æɛə]	[ɛə]
Non-prevocalic /ɡ/	bag, drag	[ɛə]	[æ] (Note: In Philadelphia, bad, mad, and glad alone in this context have [ɛə].)	[æ]	[ɛː~ɛj]	[eː~ej]	[æ~æɛə]	[ɛə]
Non-prevocalic /b, d, ʃ/	grab, flash, sad	[ɛə]	[æ]	[æ]	[æ]	[ɛə]	[æ~æɛə]	[ɛə]
Non-prevocalic /f, θ, s/	ask, bath, half, glass	[ɛə]		[æ]	[æ]	[ɛə]	[æ~æɛə]	[ɛə]
Otherwise	as, back, happy, locality	[æ] (Note: In New York City, certain lexical exceptions exist (like avenue being tense) and variability is common before /dʒ/ and /z/ as in imagine, magic, and jazz. In New Orleans, [ɛə] additionally occurs before /v/ and /z/.)		[æ]	[æ]	[ɛə]	[æ~æɛə]	[ɛə]

- Mary–marry–merry three-way distinction: As in New York accents and most native English accents outside North America, there is a three-way distinction between Mary [ˈmeɹi]~[ˈmeəɹi], marry [ˈmæɹi], and merry [ˈmɛɹi]~[ˈmɜɹi]. However, in Philadelphia some older speakers have a merger (or close approximation) of /ɛ/ and /ʌ/ before /r/ (the furry–ferry merger), so that merry is merged instead with Murray (with both pronounced something like [ˈmʌɹi]). Labov, Ash, and Boberg (2006: 54) report that about one third of Philadelphia speakers have this merger, one third have a near-merger, and one third keep the two distinct. Relatedly, as in New York, many words like orange, Florida, and horrible have /ɑ/ before /r/ rather than the /ɔr/ used in many other American dialects.

Distribution of /ɒr/ and prevocalic /ɔːr/ by dialect
	British RP	General American	Traditional American (Note: This here refers to accents of greater New York City, greater Philadelphia, the older Southern U.S., and the older Northeastern elite. It also includes some speakers, though particularly older ones, in Eastern New England (predominantly Rhode Island) and coastal states of the modern Southern U.S.)	Canada
Only borrow, sorrow, sorry, (to)morrow	/ɒr/	/ɑːr/	/ɒr/ or /ɑːr/	/ɔːr/
Forest, Florida, historic, moral, porridge, etc.	/ɒr/	/ɔːr/	/ɒr/ or /ɑːr/	/ɔːr/
Forum, memorial, oral, storage, story, etc.	/ɔːr/	/ɔːr/	/ɔːr/	/ɔːr/

- Canadian raising occurs for /aɪ/ (as in price) but not for /aʊ/ (as in mouth). Consequently, the diphthong in like may begin with a nucleus of mid or even higher position [ɫʌik], which distinguishes it from the diphthong in line [ɫaɪn]. Canadian raising in Philadelphia occurs before voiceless consonants, and it is extended to occur before some voiced consonants as well, including intervocalic voiced stops as in tiger and spider. Fruehwald (2007) argues that /aɪ/ has actually undergone a phonemic split in Philadelphia as a result of Canadian raising. The raising of /aɪ/ is unusual as the innovators of this change are primarily male speakers while the other changes in progress are led primarily by females. The sociolinguistic evidence suggests this raising is a fairly recent addition to Philadelphia speech.
- FLEECE, FACE, and DRESS vowels: Traditional Philadelphia speech shows lowered and/or laxed variants of /i/ were common: [ɪi]. The recent sociolinguistic evidence indicates a reversal of this trend such that the vowel is now commonly raised and fronted. This raising is heard primarily before consonants (e.g., eat). The Linguistic Atlas researchers recorded lax variants of /eɪ/ near [ɛɪ]. As with /i/, recent research suggests this trend is being reversed by raising and fronting of the vowel often to a position well beyond [e]. This raising occurs before consonants (e.g., paid); in word-final position (pay), /eɪ/ remains lowered and lax. Both of these can lead to nonstandard phonemic incidence (see "Phonemic incidence" section).
- Labov's research has indicated a tendency toward lowering of the lax vowels /ɪ/ and /ɛ/. This pattern is not yet well established and is labeled by Labov as an "incipient" change.
- Many Philadelphians use a rather high, back, and perhaps even rounded vowel for /ɑr/ as in START; something near [ɔ]. The so-called horse–hoarse merger takes place, and the merged vowel is typically mid to high back; it can be as high as [ʊɚ]. As noted in New York, these tendencies toward backing and raising of /ɑr/ and /ɔr/ may constitute a chain shift. The evidence suggests the movement of /ɑr/ began this shift, and this vowel is relatively stable today, while generational differences are heard in the shifting of /ɔr/.
- /ɔɪ/, as in CHOICE may be more raised than in other dialects; sometimes it is as high as [ʊɪ].
- /ʌ/, as in STRUT, may show raised and back variants. In some cases, the vowel is in the high, back corner of the vowel space near /u/. This is reportedly a recent development and is one more common among male speakers.

==== Consonants ====
- Philadelphia forms the core of the one fully rhotic major region of the traditional American East Coast. This area runs from Pennsylvania and southern New Jersey down to Delaware and northern Maryland, and remains fully r-pronouncing today.
  - Non-rhoticity (R-dropping) can be found in some areas of Philadelphia, however (presumably as a recent innovation after the nineteenth century) such as among working-class male speakers specifically from South Philadelphia, especially those born in the first half of the twentieth century and of Italian, Jewish, or Irish Catholic descent. On the other side of the socioeconomic spectrum, non-rhoticity in speakers from the Philadelphia Main Line may be a result of wealthy families sending their children to expensive boarding schools in the United Kingdom up until the 1960s and thus acquiring a "Transatlantic accent." Non-rhoticity is most prevalent among black Philadelphians, who largely do not demonstrate the regional speech features of Philadelphia English; instead, many black Philadelphians speak African-American Vernacular English.
- Consonant changes, especially reductions and lenitions, are very common in informal conversational speech, so that:
  - The sibilant /s/ is palatalized to [ʃ] (as in she) before /tr/. Thus, the word streets might be pronounced "shtreets" [ʃtɹits].
  - L-vocalization is quite pervasive in Philadelphia speech. Phonetically it may be realized as something like [o] or a velar or labio-velar glide, [ɰ] or [w], or the consonant may be deleted altogether. Among Philadelphians, as in other dialects, vocalization occurs quite frequently in word-final and pre-consonantal contexts (e.g., mill, milk). In a more unusual development, vocalization may also occur inter-vocalically in Philadelphia. This tendency is more common when /l/ appears following low vowels bearing primary word stress (e.g., hollow). This variable also shows some lexical conditioning, appearing, for example, with exceptionally high frequency in the pronunciation of the name of the city (Ash 1997). This, in part, leads to the stereotype of Philadelphia being pronounced as "Fluffya" or "Filelfia."
  - As in other areas, the interdental fricatives /θ/ and /ð/ are often realized as stops, [t] and [d] or affricates [tθ] and [dð] in Philadelphia speech. This variation appears to be a stable class-stratified feature with the non-fricative forms appearing more commonly in working-class speech.
  - The yew–hew merger can be found, as in New York City, in which words like human and huge, which begin with an /hj/ cluster, the /h/ is commonly deleted giving /ˈjumən/ and /judʒ/.
  - Consonant cluster reductions, such as removing the "t" sound from consonant clusters, so that "mustard" sounds more like "mussard," or "soft" like "sawff."

==== Phonemic incidence ====
- On is traditionally pronounced /ɔn/, phonemically matching the South and Midland varieties of American English (and unlike most New York accents), thus rhyming with dawn rather than don. However, the Northern /ɑn/ has also been reported.
- The word water is commonly pronounced /ˈwʊtər/ (with the first syllable rhyming with the word put, so that it sounds like "wooter" or "wooder"), rather than the more standard English /ˈwɔtər/. This is considered by many to be a shibboleth of the Philadelphia dialect, even among young Philadelphians, though Labov has argued that it is an exaggerated stereotype and the more common pronunciation uses a raised /ɔ/ rather than /ʊ/.
- Both long-e and long-a sounds may be shortened before /ɡ/. Eagle rhymes with giggle /ˈɪɡəl/ (as in "the Iggles"); league /lɪɡ/ rhymes with big; vague and plague rhyme with peg (pronounced /vɛɡ/ and /plɛɡ/, respectively). For some Philadelphians, colleague and fatigue also have /ɪ/ (pronounced /ˈkɑlɪɡ/ and /fəˈtɪɡ/, respectively). However, these are words learned later, so many speakers use the more standard American /ˈkɑliɡ/ and /fəˈtiɡ/.
- In words like gratitude, beautiful, attitude, Baltimore, and prostitute, the i may be pronounced with the ee sound /i/, as in bee.

=== Grammar ===
"Be done + noun phrase": The grammatical construction "be done something" means roughly "have/has finished something." For example, "I am done my homework" and "The dog is done dinner" are genuine sentences in this dialect and mean respectively "I have finished my homework" and "The dog has finished dinner." Another example, "Let's start after you're done all the coffee," means "Let's start after you've finished all the coffee." This is not exactly the same as the standard construction "to be done with something" since "She is done the computer" can mean "She is done with the computer" only in one sense: "She has finished (building) the computer."

=== Lexicon ===
The interjection yo originated in the Philadelphia dialect among Italian-American and African-American youths. The word is commonly used as a greeting or a way to get someone's attention.

Many Philadelphians are known to use the expression "youse" both as second person plural and (rarely) second person singular pronoun, much like the mostly Southern / Western expression "y'all" or the Pittsburgh term "yinz." "Youse" or "youse guys" is common in many working-class Northeastern U.S. areas though it is often associated especially with Philadelphia. However, unlike in other Northeastern U.S. areas, the Philadelphian pronunciation of "youse" more often than not reflects vowel reduction and frequently yields /jəz/ and /jɪz/ ("yiz"), rather than the stereotypical /juz/ ("youse"). (ex: "Yiz want anything at the store?" "Yiz guys alright over there?"). Second person singular forms commonly are heard as /jə/ and /jɪ/.

Anymore is used as a positive polarity item, e.g. "Joey's hoagies taste different anymore." This sense of anymore is not specific to the region but is well represented there.

A sandwich consisting of a long bread filled with lunch meat, cheese, and lettuce, onion and tomato, variously called a "sub" or "submarine sandwich" in other parts of the United States, is called a hoagie. Olive oil, rather than mayonnaise, is used as a topping, and "hot" or "sweet" peppers are used for spice. The term 'hoagie' originated in Philadelphia.

A similar sandwich toasted in an oven or broiler is called a grinder.

Small chocolate or multi-colored confections sprinkled on ice cream and cake icing, elsewhere called sprinkles, are known as jimmies in the Philadelphia area, as well as in the Boston and Pittsburgh areas. (For Bostonians and some older Philadelphians, only chocolate sprinkles are called jimmies.)

Another distinctively Philadelphian word is jawn. According to Dan Nosowitz, jawn "is an all-purpose noun, a stand-in for inanimate objects, abstract concepts, events, places, individual people, and groups of people."

== Notable native speakers ==
=== Lifelong speakers ===
The following well-known Philadelphians represent a sampling of those who have exhibited a Philadelphia accent:

- Bill Adolph – "whose Philly accent was sharp enough to cut glass"
- Eddie Alvarez – "His accent is about as Philly as it gets."
- Chuck Barris – "Barris' Philly accent"
- Joe Bonsall – "The fast-talking Philly native who never lost his accent"
- Bob Brady – "a thick Philly accent."
- Sean Brady – "Northeast Philly guy. Great accent."
- Kellyanne Conway – of whom it was once observed that "she's such a hoagiemouth that it's impossible to even say her name without sounding like you, too, speak hoagiemouth"
- Jim Cramer – "his pronounced Philly accent"
- The Dead Milkmen – "meandering punk rock, and heavy Philly accents"
- Tim Donaghy – "whose Philly accent remains ... thick"
- Johnny Dougherty – "thick Philadelphia accent"
- Joe Flacco – "where his thick Philly/South Jersey accent won't stick out like a sore thumb"
- Tom Gola – "he did it all in Philadelphia, a hometown his nasal accent betrayed"
- Big Daddy Graham – "Nasal, raspy, with an accent somewhere out of Southwest Philly."
- Theresa Grentz – "Talking with an accent thicker than the cheese on a Philly steak"
- Joan Jett – "her distinct Philadelphia accent & swagger"
- Joe Kerrigan – "with his curt Philadelphia accent"
- Jim Lynam – "speaks in a fast, choppy tone with a distinct Philadelphia accent."
- Herb Magee – "Philadelphia University coach, whose accent, Irish mug, and hoops pedigree epitomize the hometown he's never left"
- Bam Margera – "Not sure if you've heard the Philly patois? ... star Bam Margera, who is from nearby West Chester, has it."
- Chris Matthews – "I don't think I ever realized I had a Philadelphia accent"
- Mike Mayock – "With his thick Philly accent"
- Katie McGinty – "McGinty intones in a Philadelphia accent."
- Patrick Joseph Murphy – "Murphy hasn't lost his thick Philly accent"
- Josh Ostrander – "speaks with a Philly accent"
- Jimmy Pop of Bloodhound Gang – noted for singing in a "Philly accent."
- Stephen Sweeney – "an accent that screams South Jersey"
- Kurt Vile – "an angelic and – at this point infamous – DelCo accent"

==== Lifelong non-rhotic South Philadelphia speakers ====
These speakers, primarily of Irish, Italian, or Jewish ethnicity, show the non-rhotic version of the Philadelphia accent local to South Philadelphia:

- Joey Bishop – "an accent as thick as a porterhouse steak"
- David Brenner – "I have a mixture of the South and West Philly [accents], so people think I'm from New York."
- Larry Fine – "mimic Fine's Philadelphia accent"
- William Guarnere and Edward "Babe" Heffron – "the old South Philly accent"
- Dom Irrera – "Irrera's voice, a blue-collar, South Philly, old-neighborhood kind of yak"
- Tony Luke Jr. – "a rasping South Philly accent that played well on television"
- Joey Merlino – "his Philadelphia accent unmistakable"
- Joey Vento – "his charming South Philly accent"
- Tony Verna – "his South Philadelphia accent"

=== Marginal speakers ===
These speakers retain slight traces or elements of a rhotic Philadelphia accent:

- Gloria Allred – "slightly nasal, Philadelphia-accented voice that can drip with sarcasm"
- Kevin Bacon and Bruce Willis – "two native [Philadelphia] sons, Bruce Willis (Salem County, N.J.) and Kevin Bacon (Center City Philadelphia), who, at least in interviews early in their career, before accent reduction training kicked in, let their diphthong freak flags fly."
- Jill Biden – "She exaggerates her Philadelphia suburbs accent, which is already pretty strong."
- Gia Carangi – "professional voice instructors ... [were] trying to neutralize her unsophisticated Philadelphia accent so she might get into acting"
- Noam Chomsky – "I speak with the accent from a certain area in northeastern Philadelphia where I grew up."
- Garrett "G. Love" Dutton – "a watered-down Philadelphian accent"
- Tina Fey – "Pennsylvania-native Tina Fey showcased the accent"
- Carli Lloyd – "And listen closely when she says 'pass' or 'me' — the South Jersey accent is charmingly unmistakable."
- Rob McElhenney – "I ... worked my way out of the accent for acting. ... My brother and sister have much stronger accents ... I still have a little bit of the accent"
- Benjamin Netanyahu – "his Philly-flecked American English a vestige of his childhood years in suburban Cheltenham."
- Bo Ryan – "still had a hint of a Philly accent ... even after years in [the] Midwest."
- Patti Smith – "still harbors a slight (and endearing) South Jersey accent"
- Peter Vermes – "has deep roots in South Jersey, even if his many years in the [M]idwest have turned his accent into a lilt."

== In media ==
Philadelphia English spoken by native speakers is seldom heard in films and fictional television shows. Films and television shows set in the Philadelphia region generally make the mistake of giving the characters a working-class New York City dialect (specifically heard in Philadelphia-set films such as the Rocky series and Philadelphia). The use of geographically inaccurate dialects is also true in films and television programs set in South Jersey; the characters often use a supposed "Joisey" dialect, when in reality that New York-influenced dialect for New Jersey natives is almost always exclusive to the northern region of the state nearest to New York City, while most South Jersey residents speak with a Philadelphia accent.

The Philadelphia dialect is prominently featured in the 2021 television miniseries Mare of Easttown, set in Delaware County, Pennsylvania ("Delco"), adjacent to Philadelphia to the west and south. Reviews of the portrayal of the dialect by British lead actress Kate Winslet and others have been mostly positive. An exaggerated Delco 'drawl' was consequently parodied on Saturday Night Live. Winslet described the Delco accent as being "up there with the hardest accents I've ever done".

=== News media and reality TV ===
Philadelphia natives who work in media and entertainment often assimilate to the General American broadcast standard. Speakers with a noticeable local accent include Jim Cramer, the host of CNBC's Mad Money, singer Joe Bonsall, political commentator Chris Matthews, Bam Margera, and several others in the MTV Jackass crew. Venezuelan-American actress Sonya Smith, who was born in Philadelphia, speaks with a Philadelphia accent in both English and Venezuelan Spanish. Local television, political, and sports personalities in South Jersey and part of Central Jersey tend to be much more culturally associated with Philadelphia than New York City.

== See also ==
- List of Philadelphia placename etymologies
- Western Pennsylvania English
- Pennsylvania Dutch English
- Midland American English
- American English regional vocabulary
- Jawn

== Bibliography ==
- Baker, Adam; Mielke, Jeff; Archangeli, Diana (2008). "More velar than /g/: Consonant Coarticulation as a Cause of Diphthongization" (PDF). In Chang, Charles B.; Haynie, Hannah J. (eds.). Proceedings of the 26th West Coast Conference on Formal Linguistics. Somerville, Massachusetts: Cascadilla Proceedings Project. pp. 60–68. ISBN 978-1-57473-423-2.
- Boberg, Charles (2008). "Regional phonetic differentiation in Standard Canadian English". Journal of English Linguistics. 36 (2): 129–154. doi:10.1177/0075424208316648. S2CID 146478485.
- Duncan, Daniel (June 21, 2016). "'Tense' /æ/ is still lax: A phonotactics study". Proceedings of the Annual Meetings on Phonology. 3. doi:10.3765/amp.v3i0.3653.
- Kurath, Hans; McDavid, Raven I. Jr. (1961). The pronunciation of English in the Atlantic states. Ann Arbor: University of Michigan Press. ISBN 9780817301293.
- Labov, William (2001). "Principles of linguistic change: Social factors". Language in Society. 2 (29). Oxford: Blackwell.
- Labov, William (2007). "Transmission and Diffusion" (PDF). Language. 83 (2): 344–387. doi:10.1353/lan.2007.0082. JSTOR 40070845. S2CID 6255506.
- Labov, William; Ash, Sharon; Boberg, Charles (2006). The Atlas of North American English. Berlin: Mouton de Gruyter. ISBN 978-3-11-016746-7. cf. Chapter 17.
