= Midland American English =

Variety of English spoken in the United States

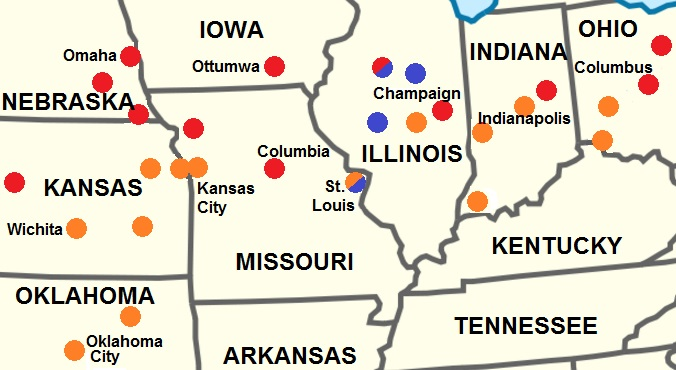
According to Labov et al.'s (2006) ANAE, the strict Midland dialect region comprises the cities represented here by circles in red (North Midland) and orange (South Midland). In the past, linguists considered the Midland dialect to cover an even larger area, extending eastward through Pennsylvania to the Atlantic Ocean. The color blue on this map indicates the Inland North dialect, which is intruding southward into the middle of this region towards St. Louis, Missouri, and Peoria, Illinois, which show variation between the Midland and Inland North dialects. The distinction between the North and South Midland regions is that the South Midland shows a tendency for extra features usually associated with Southern American dialects: notably, strong /oʊ/ fronting, a pin–pen merger, and a glide weakening of /aɪ/ before sonorant consonants.

Midland American English is a regional dialect or supradialect of American English, geographically lying between the traditionally defined Northern and Southern United States. The boundaries of Midland American English are not entirely clear, being revised and reduced by linguists due to definitional changes and several Midland sub-regions undergoing rapid and diverging pronunciation shifts since the early-middle 20th century onwards.

As of the early 21st century, these general characteristics of the Midland regional accent are firmly established: fronting of the /oʊ/, /aʊ/, and /ʌ/ vowels occurs towards the center or even the front of the mouth; the cot–caught merger is neither fully completed nor fully absent; and short-a tensing evidently occurs strongest before nasal consonants. The currently documented core of the Midland dialect region spans from central Ohio at its eastern extreme to central Nebraska and Oklahoma City at its western extreme. Certain areas outside the core also clearly demonstrate a Midland accent, including Charleston, South Carolina; the Texan cities of Abilene, Austin, and Corpus Christi; and central and some areas of southern Florida.

Early 20th-century dialectology was the first to identify the "Midland" as a region lexically distinct from the North and the South and later even focused on an internal division: North Midland versus South Midland. However, 21st-century studies now reveal increasing unification of the South Midland with a larger mid-20th-century Southern accent region, while much of the North Midland retains a more "General American" accent. The region north of the Midland uses Great Lakes accents.

Early 20th-century boundaries established for the Midland dialect region are being reduced or revised since several previous subregions of Midland speech have since developed their own distinct dialects. Pennsylvania, the original home state of the Midland dialect, is one such area and has now formed such unique dialects as Philadelphia and Pittsburgh English.

== Original and former Midland ==
The dialect region "Midland" was first labeled in the 1890s, but only first defined (tentatively) by Hans Kurath in 1949 as centered on central Pennsylvania and expanding westward and southward to include most of Pennsylvania, and the Appalachian regions of Kentucky, Tennessee, and all of West Virginia. A decade later, Kurath split this into two discrete subdivisions: the "North Midland" beginning north of the Ohio River valley area and extending westward into central Indiana, central Illinois, central Ohio, Iowa, and northern Missouri, as well as parts of Nebraska and northern Kansas; and the "South Midland", which extends south of the Ohio River and expands westward to include parts of Kentucky, Tennessee, southern Indiana, southern Illinois, southern Ohio, southern Missouri, Arkansas, southern Kansas, and Oklahoma, west of the Mississippi River. Kurath and then later Craig Carver and the related Dictionary of American Regional English based their 1960s research only on lexical (vocabulary) characteristics, with Carver et al. determining the Midland non-existent according to their 1987 publication and preferring to identify Kurath's North Midland as merely an extension of the North and his South Midland as an extension of the South, based on some 800 lexical items.

Conversely, William Labov and his team based their 1990s research largely on phonological (sound) characteristics and re-identified the Midland area as a buffer zone between the Inland Southern and Inland Northern accent regions. In Labov et al.'s newer study, the "Midland" essentially coincides with Kurath's "North Midland", while the "South Midland" is now considered as largely a portion, or the northern fringe, of the larger 20th-century Southern accent region. Indeed, while the lexical and grammatical isoglosses encompass the Appalachian Mountains regardless of the Ohio River, the phonological boundary fairly closely follows along the Ohio River itself. More recent research has focused on grammatical characteristics and in particular a variable, possible combination of such characteristics.

The original Midland dialect region, thus, has split off into having more of a Southern accent in southern Appalachia, while the second half of the 20th century has seen the emergence of a unique Western Pennsylvania accent in northern Appalachia (centered on Pittsburgh) as well as a unique Philadelphia accent.

=== Mid-Atlantic region ===
The dialect region of the Mid-Atlantic States—centered on Philadelphia, Pennsylvania; Baltimore, Maryland; and Wilmington, Delaware—aligns to the Midland phonological definition except that it strongly resists the cot–caught merger and traditionally has a short-a split that is similar to New York City's, though still unique. Certain vocabulary is also specific to the Mid-Atlantic dialect, and particularly to its Philadelphia sub-dialect.

=== Western Pennsylvania ===
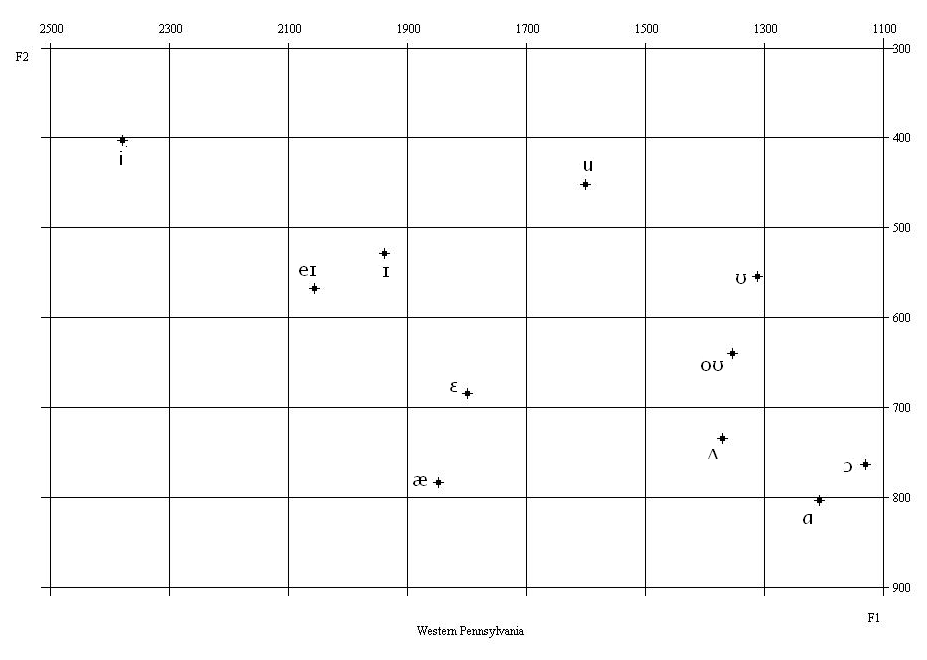
Based on Labov et al., ' averaged F1/F2 means for speakers from Western Pennsylvania. The merger of /ɑ/ and /ɔ/ is complete for 11 out of 14 speakers; /ʌ/ is backer and lower than in the rest of the North Midland.

The emerging and expanding dialect of western and much of central Pennsylvania is, for many purposes, an extension of the South Midland; it is spoken also in Youngstown, Ohio, 10 miles west of the state line, as well as Clarksburg, West Virginia. Like the Midland proper, the Western Pennsylvania accent features fronting of /oʊ/ and /aʊ/, as well as positive anymore. Its chief distinguishing features, however, also make it a separate dialect from the Midland one. These features include a completed lot–thought merger to a rounded vowel, which also causes a chain shift that drags the strut vowel into the previous position of lot. The Western Pennsylvania accent, lightheartedly known as "Pittsburghese", is perhaps best known for the monophthongization of mouth (/aʊ/ to [aː]), such as the stereotypical Pittsburgh pronunciation of downtown as dahntahn. Despite having a Northern accent in the first half of the 20th century, Erie, Pennsylvania, is the only major Northern city to change its affiliation to Midland by now using the Western Pennsylvania accent.

== Phonology and phonetics ==
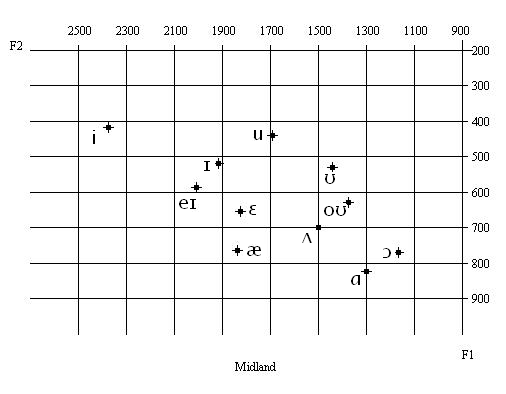
Based on Labov et al.; averaged F1/F2 means for speakers from the (North) Midland (excluding Western Pennsylvania and the St. Louis corridor). /ɑ/ and /ɔ/ are close but not merged.

- Rhoticity: Midland speech is firmly rhotic (or fully r-pronouncing), like most North American English.
- Cot–caught merger in transition: The merger of the vowel sounds in lot and thought is consistently in a transitional phase throughout most of the Midland region, showing neither a full presence nor absence of the merger. This involves a vowel merger of the "short o" /ɑ/ (as in cot or stock) and "aw" /ɔ/ (as in caught or stalk) phonemes.
  - On boundary: A well-known phonological difference between Midland and Northern accents is that in the Midland, the single word on contains the phoneme /ɔ/ (as in caught) rather than /ɑ/ (as in cot), as in the North. For this reason, one of the names for the boundary between the dialects of the Midland and the North is the "on line".
- Epenthetic R: The phoneme sequence /wɑʃ/, as in wash, squash, and Washington, traditionally receives an additional /r/ sound after the ⟨a⟩, thus with Washington sounding like /ˈwɑrʃɪŋtən/ or /ˈwɔrʃɪŋtən/. Likely inherited from Scots-Irish influence, this features ranges from D.C., Maryland, southern Pennsylvania, West Virginia, Kentucky, Arkansas, West Texas, and the Midland dialect regions within Ohio, Indiana, Illinois, Missouri, Oklahoma, and Kansas. Studied best of all in southern Pennsylvania, this feature may be declining.
- The short-a phoneme, /æ/ (trap), most commonly follows a General American ("continuous" and pre-nasal) distribution: /æ/ is raised and tensed toward [eə] before nasal consonants (such as fan) but remains low [æ] in other contexts (such as fact). An increasing number of speakers from central Ohio realize the TRAP vowel /æ/ as open front [a].
- Fronting of /oʊ/ (goat): the phoneme /oʊ/ (as in goat) is fronter than in many other American accents, particularly those of the North; the phoneme is frequently realized as a diphthong with a central nucleus, approximating [əʊ~ɵʊ].
- Fronting of /aʊ/ (mouth): the diphthong /aʊ/ (as in mouth) has a fronter nucleus than /aɪ/, approaching [æʊ~ɛɔ].
- Fronting of /ʌ/ (strut): among younger speakers, /ʌ/ (as in bug, strut, what, etc.) is shifting strongly to the front: [ɜ].
- Lowering of /eɪ/ (face): the diphthong /eɪ/ (as in face, reign, day, etc.) often has a lower nucleus than the Northern accents just above Midland region.
- Phonologically, the South Midland remains slightly different from the North Midland (and more like the American South) in certain respects: its greater likelihood of a fronted /oʊ/, a pin–pen merger, and a "glideless" /aɪ/ vowel reminiscent of the Southern U.S. accent, though /aɪ/ monophthongization in the South Midland only tends to appear before sonorant consonants: /m/, /n/, /l/, /r/. For example, fire may be pronounced something like far. Southern Indiana is the northernmost extent of this accent, forming what dialectologists refer to as the "Hoosier Apex" of the South Midland, with the accent locally known as the "Hoosier Twang".

== Grammar ==
- Positive anymore: A common feature of the greater Midland area is so-called "positive anymore": It is possible to use the adverb anymore with the meaning "nowadays" in sentences without negative polarity, such as Air travel is inconvenient anymore, or The streets of the city are very crowded anymore.
- "Need + participle": Many speakers use the construction "need + past participle". Some examples include:
  - The car needs washed to mean the car needs to be washed
  - They need repaired to mean they need to be repaired
  - So much still needs said to mean so much still needs to be said

To a lesser degree, a small number of other verbs have been reportedly used in this way too, such as The baby likes cuddled or She wants prepared. As seen in these examples, it is also acceptable to use this construction with the words want and like.

- "All the + comparative": Speakers throughout the Midland (except central and southern Illinois and especially Iowa) may use "all the [comparative form of an adjective]" to mean "as [adjective] as", when followed by a subject. Some examples include:
  - I held all the tighter I could to mean I held as tight as I could
  - That was all the higher she could jump to mean That was as high as she could jump
  - This is all the more comfortable it gets to mean This is as comfortable as it gets
- These same speakers may also alternatively use this form to mean "as much [comparative form of that adjective] as", when followed by such a subject. The corresponding examples would be:
  - I held all the tighter I could to mean I held as much tighter as I could
  - That was all the higher she could jump to mean That was as much higher as she could jump
  - This is all the more comfortable it gets to mean This is as much more comfortable as it gets
- Alls: At the start of a sentence, "alls [subject] [verb]" can be used in place of "all that [subject] [verb]" to form a noun phrase followed by is or was. For example (with the entire clause in italics): "Alls we brought was bread" or "Alls I want to do is sing a song". This has been especially well-studied in southern Ohio, though it is widespread throughout the nation.
- Many other grammatical constructions are also reported to varying degrees, predominantly of Scots-Irish origin, that could hypothetically define a Midland dialect, such as: what-all (an alternative to what), wakened (an alternative to woke or woke up), sick at the stomach, quarter till (as in quarter till two to mean the time 1:45), and whenever to mean when (e.g. I cheered last Saturday whenever I won the award or He got married whenever he was 30).

== Vocabulary ==
- bank(ed) barn, particularly in the East Midland (Indiana, Ohio, and Pennsylvania), for a barn built into a hill with two-level access
- berm, in the East Midland (Indiana, Ohio, and Pennsylvania), and parking, in Illinois and Iowa, for a road verge
- blinds for window shutters
- carry-in, in the East Midland (Illinois, Indiana, and Ohio), for potluck
- carry-out for take-out
- chuckhole, particularly in the East Midland (Indiana and Ohio), and chughole, in the South Midland, for pothole
- crawdad for crayfish
- dope, in Ohio, for dessert sauce
- mango (or mango pepper) for green bell pepper, often when pickled or stuffed
- pop in Kansas, Nebraska, Iowa, western Missouri, northeastern Oklahoma, central Illinois, northern Indiana, Ohio, and Pennsylvania; soda, in eastern Missouri and southern Illinois; and coke in the Indianapolis metropolitan area, southwestern Indiana, and the Oklahoma City metropolitan area
- sack for any disposable bag
- tennis shoes for any generic athletic shoes (gym shoes in Cincinnati and Chicago; also, less often, running shoes in Cincinnati)

Today, the Midland is considered a transitional dialect region between the South and Inland North; however, the "South Midland" is a sub-region that phonologically speaking fits more with the South and even employs some Southern vocabulary, for example, favoring y'all as the plural of you, whereas the rest of the (North) Midland favors you guys. Another possible Appalachian and South Midland variant is you'uns (from you ones), though it remains most associated with Western Pennsylvania English.

== Charleston ==
Today, the city of Charleston, South Carolina, clearly has all the defining features of a mainstream Midland accent. The vowels /oʊ/ and /u/ are extremely fronted, though not so much before /l/. Also, the older, more traditional Charleston accent was extremely "non-Southern" in sound (as well as being highly unique), spoken throughout the South Carolina and Georgia Lowcountry, but it mostly faded out of existence in the first half of the 20th century.

== Cincinnati ==
Older English speakers of Cincinnati, Ohio, have a phonological pattern quite distinct from the surrounding area (Boberg and Strassel 2000), while younger speakers now align to the general Midland accent. The older Cincinnati short-a system is unique in the Midland. While there is no evidence for a phonemic split, the phonetic conditioning of short-a in conservative Cincinnati speech is similar to and originates from that of New York City, with the raising environments including nasals (m, n, ŋ), voiceless fricatives (f, unvoiced th, sh, s), and voiced stops (b, d, g). Weaker forms of this pattern are shown by speakers from nearby Dayton and Springfield. Boberg and Strassel (2000) reported that Cincinnati's traditional short-a system was giving way among younger speakers to a nasal system similar to those found elsewhere in the Midland and the West.

== St. Louis corridor ==
St. Louis, Missouri is historically a South Midland or Southern American English region, though over the years it has gradually shifted to (North) Midland cities, but it has developed some unique features of its own distinguishing it from the rest of the Midland. The area around St. Louis has been in dialectal transition throughout most of the 1900s until the present moment. The eldest generation of the area may exhibit a rapidly-declining merger of the phonemes /ɔr/ (as in for) and /ɑr/ (as in far) to the sound [ɒɹ], while leaving distinct /oʊr/ (as in four), thus being one of the few American accents to still resist the horse-hoarse merger (while also displaying the card-cord merger). This merger has led to jokes referring to "I farty-far", although a more accurate eye spelling would be "I farty-four". Also, some St. Louis speakers, again usually the oldest ones, have /eɪ/ instead of more typical /ɛ/ before /ʒ/—thus measure is pronounced [ˈmeɪʒɚ]—and wash (as well as Washington) gains an /r/, becoming [wɒɹʃ] ("warsh").

Since the mid-1900s (namely, in speakers born from the 1920s to 1940s), however, a newer accent arose in a dialect "corridor" essentially following historic U.S. Route 66 in Illinois (now Interstate 55 in Illinois) from Chicago southwest to St. Louis. Speakers of this modern "St. Louis Corridor"—including St. Louis, Missouri, as well as Springfield, Bloomington, Fairbury, and (to a varying extent) Peoria, Illinois—have gradually developed more features of the Inland North dialect, best recognized today as the Chicago accent. This 20th-century St. Louis accent's separating quality from the rest of the Midland is its strong resistance to the cot–caught merger and the most advanced development of the Northern Cities Vowel Shift (NCS). In the 20th century, Greater St. Louis therefore became a mix of Midland accents and Inland Northern (Chicago-like) accents.

Even more complicated, however, there is evidence that these Northern sound changes are reversing for the younger generations of speakers in the St. Louis area, who are re-embracing purely Midland-like accent features, though only at a regional level and therefore not including the aforementioned traditional features of the eldest generation. According to a UPenn study, the St. Louis Corridor's one-generation period of embracing the NCS was followed by the next generation's "retreat of NCS features from Route 66 and a slight increase of NCS off of Route 66", in turn followed by the most recent generations' decreasing evidence of the NCS until it disappears altogether among the youngest speakers. Thus, due to harboring two different dialects in the same geographic space, the "Corridor appears simultaneously as a single dialect area and two separate dialect areas".

== Texas ==
Rather than a proper Southern accent, several cities in Texas can be better described as having a Midland U.S. accent, as they lack the "true" Southern accent's full /aɪ/ deletion and the oft-accompanying Southern Vowel Shift. Texan cities classifiable as such specifically include Abilene, Austin, San Antonio and Corpus Christi. Austin, in particular, has been reported in some speakers to show the South Midland (but not the Southern) variant of /aɪ/ deletion mentioned above.

== Bibliography ==
- Labov, William; Ash, Sharon; Boberg, Charles (2006). The Atlas of North American English. Berlin: Mouton-de Gruyter. ISBN 3-11-016746-8.
- Murray, T. E.; Simon, B. L. (2006), "What is dialect? Revisiting the Midland", Language variation and change in the American Midland: A new look at 'Heartland' English, Amsterdam: John Benjamins, ISBN 9027248966
- Thomas, Erik R. (2004), "Rural Southern White Accents", in Schneider, Edgar W.; Burridge, Kate; Kortmann, Bernd; Mesthrie, Rajend; Upton, Clive (eds.), A Handbook of Varieties of English, vol. 1: Phonology, Mouton de Gruyter, pp. 300–324, ISBN 3-11-017532-0
- Wolfram, Walt; Ward, Ben, eds. (2006). American Voices: How Dialects Differ from Coast to Coast. Malden, MA: Blackwell Publishing.
