= Positive anymore =

Dialectal use of 'anymore' with positive polarity

Positive anymore is the use of the adverb anymore in an affirmative context. While any more (also spelled anymore) is typically a negative/interrogative polarity item used in negative, interrogative, or hypothetical contexts, speakers of some dialects of English use it in positive or affirmative contexts, (Note: This refers to morphosyntactic context, and not necessarily to connotation. Positive anymore may express negative feelings about a situation, but it is not a negative polarity item, which can occur only with a negative word such as not or doesn't.) with a meaning similar to nowadays or from now on. The difference between negative (NPI, short for "negative polarity item") anymore and positive anymore can be characterized as follows:

- Negative: "I don't eat meat anymore" → "I used to eat meat, and (but) I don't now"
- Positive: "I eat meat anymore" → "I didn't eat meat before, and (but) I do now"

Positive anymore occurs in some varieties of North American English, especially in Philadelphia and its metropolitan area, Baltimore and its suburbs, as well as the Midland variety widely spoken in Ohio, Indiana, Illinois, Kansas, Iowa, and Missouri; its usage extends to Nevada, Utah and some other western U.S. states. It also occurs in parts of Ireland.

Regarding prescriptive recommendations on usage, Garner's Modern English Usage echoes the typical prescription that it not be used in writing intended to meet approval with prescriptive readers, scoring it as "misused" and Stage 1 (rejected) on Garner's Language-Change Index (similar to the Heller & Macris index): "In a linguistic study of Missourians, informants considered this dialectal usage 'well established, though controversial.' [...] That means that the informants were all familiar with it, but many didn't like it. The findings would probably hold throughout most of the United States." Both Merriam-Webster's Collegiate Dictionary and the American Heritage Dictionary of the English Language have usage notes covering the positive use and its distribution.

Some linguists theorize that the North American usage derives from Irish or Scots-Irish sources.

== Examples ==
The following examples illustrate the use of positive anymore in Irish or North American English speech, as recorded by lexicographers or sociolinguists.

- "A servant being instructed how to act, will answer 'I will do it any more'." (Northern Ireland, c. 1898)
- "Any more, the difference between a white collar worker and a blue collar worker is simply a matter of shirt preference." (Madison, Wisconsin, 1973)
- "Everything we do anymore seems to have been done in a big hurry." (Kingston, Ontario, 1979)
- "I'll be getting six or seven days' holiday anymore." (Belfast, Northern Ireland, 1981)
- "Anymore we watch videos rather than go to the movies." (Philadelphia, Pennsylvania, c. 1991)
