= The Atlas of North American English =

Dialectological map of English in the U.S. and Canada

The Atlas of North American English: Phonetics, Phonology and Sound Change (abbreviated ANAE; formerly, the Phonological Atlas of North America) is a 2006 book that presents an overview of the pronunciation patterns (accents) in all the major dialect regions of the English language as spoken in urban areas of the United States and Canada. It is the result of a large-scale survey by linguists William Labov, Sharon Ash, and Charles Boberg. Speech data was collected, mainly from 1992 to 1999, by means of telephone interviews with individuals in metropolitan areas in all regions of the U.S. and Canada. Using acoustic analysis of speech from these interviews, ANAE traces sound changes in progress in North American English, and defines boundaries between dialect regions based on the different sound changes taking place in them.

The Atlas of North American English received the Leonard Bloomfield Book Award at the 2008 meeting of the Linguistic Society of America.

== Findings ==
The Atlas defines several major dialect regions on the basis of distinctive phonological patterns and sound changes taking place in them—often chain shifts among the vowel phonemes. Major regions include:

- The Inland North, characterized by the Northern Cities Vowel Shift
- Canada, characterized by the Canadian Vowel Shift
- Several dialects in New England, characterized by different combinations of the cot–caught merger and non-rhoticity
- New York City, characterized by non-rhoticity and a complex pattern of /æ/ tensing
- The Mid-Atlantic region, including Philadelphia and Baltimore, characterized by complex /æ/ tensing, rhoticity, and the fronting of the back vowels /aw/, /ow/, and /uw/
- The South, characterized by the monophthongization of /ay/ and the resulting Southern Vowel Shift
- The Midland, characterized by the fronting of back vowels without monophthongization of /ay/
- The West, characterized by the cot–caught merger, the absence of the distinctive features of adjacent regions, and a high degree of internal heterogeneity

On the basis of changes such as the Northern Cities Vowel Shift and the Canadian Shift, the Atlas concludes that regions are becoming more dissimilar to each other, and thus the dialect diversity of North America is increasing.

== Notation ==
ANAE employs a "binary" phonemic notation system designed to be maximally abstract and economical so that it can be used to describe chain shifts with ease. The checked vowels are represented by single letters, and each of the diphthongs and historically long vowels is represented by a nuclear vowel followed by a glide, /y/, /w/ or /h/. /y/ represents any kind of front upglide [j, i, ɪ, e, ɛ], /w/ represents any kind of back upglide [w, u, ʊ, o, ɤ], and /h/ represents an inglide or long monophthong. The following tables provide a comparison between ANAE's notation and Wikipedia's diaphonemic transcription system.

Short vowels
ANAE	WP	Example
i	/ɪ/	bit
e	/ɛ/	bet
æ	/æ/	bat
u	/ʊ/	foot
ʌ	/ʌ/	hut
o	/ɒ/	hot

Long vowels
ANAE	WP	Example
iy	/iː/	beat
ey	/eɪ/	bait
oy	/ɔɪ/	quoit
ay	/aɪ/	bite
iw	/juː/	suit
uw	/uː/	boot
ow	/oʊ/	boat
aw	/aʊ/	bout
ah	/ɑː/	balm
oh	/ɔː/	bought

Before tautosyllabic /r/
ANAE	WP	Example
ihr	/ɪər/	fear
ehr	/ɛər/	fair
ʌhr	/ɜːr/	fur
ahr	/ɑːr/	far
uhr	/ʊər/	moor
ohr	/ɔːr/	four
ɔhr	/ɔːr/	for

== See also ==
- North American English regional phonology
- Dialectology

== Bibliography ==
- Labov, William; Ash, Sharon; Boberg, Charles (2006). The Atlas of North American English: Phonetics, Phonology and Sound Change. Berlin and New York: Mouton de Gruyter. ISBN 3-11-016746-8.
