= Western Pennsylvania English =

Dialect of American English

- Pittsburgh English, Pittsburghese
- Region: Western Pennsylvania
- Language family: Indo-European: Germanic; West Germanic; Ingvaeonic; Anglo–Frisian; Anglic; English; North American English; American English; Western Pennsylvania English
- Early forms: Old English: Middle English; Early Modern English
- Writing system: English alphabet

Language codes
- ISO 639-3: –
- Glottolog: west2919
- Linguasphere: 52-ABA-cgb
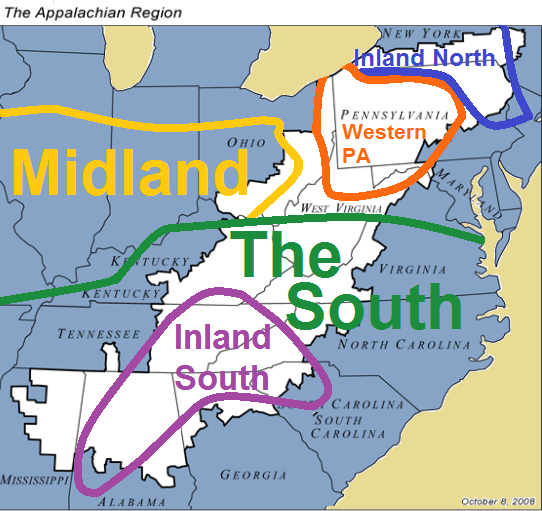
- Appalachia (in white) overlaid with dialect regions defined by the 2006 ANAE. Western Pennsylvania English can be seen in orange.

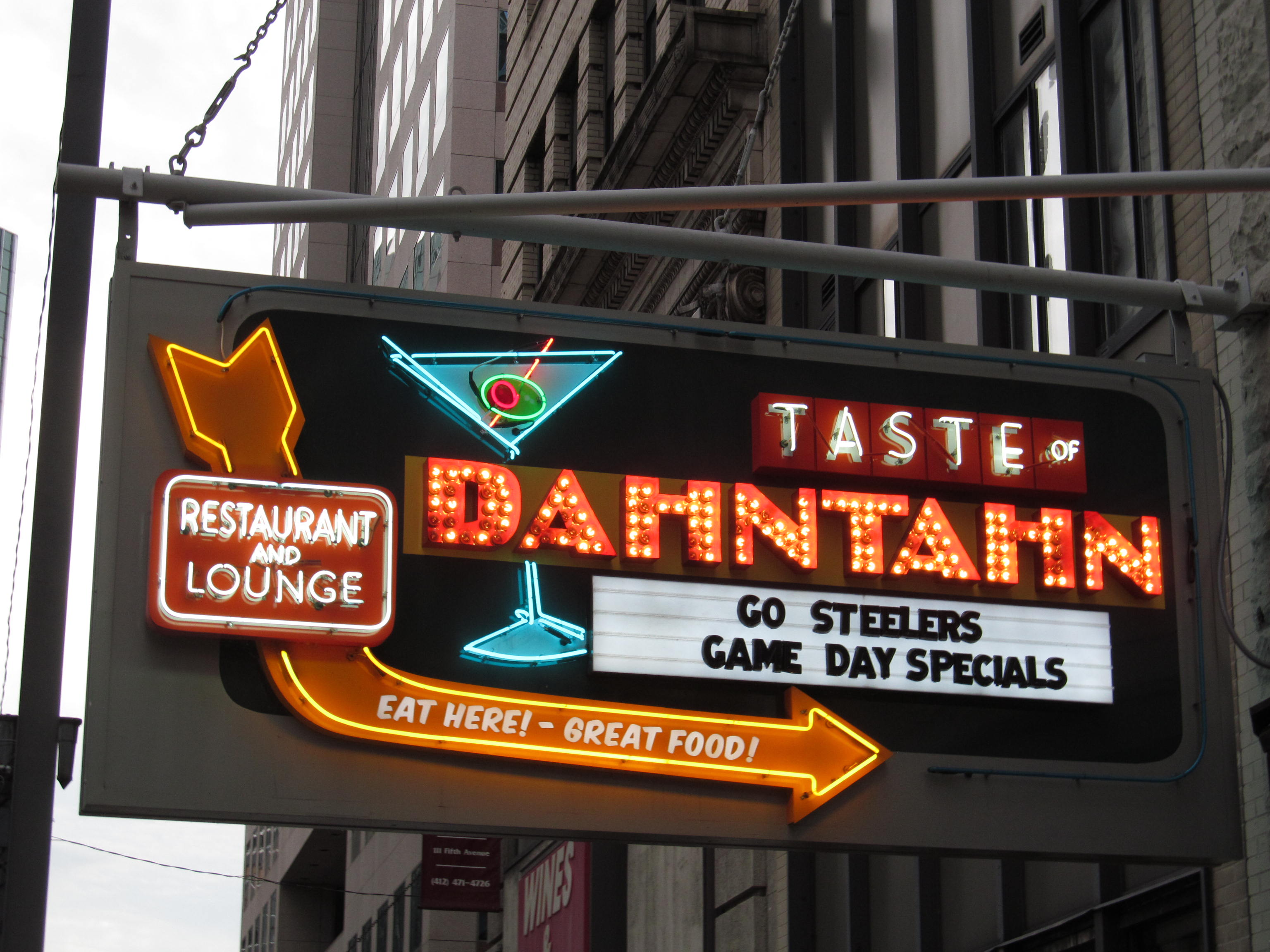
A sign using "Dahntahn" to mean "Downtown" in Downtown Pittsburgh

Western Pennsylvania English, known more narrowly as Pittsburgh English or popularly as Pittsburghese, is a dialect of American English native primarily to the western half of Pennsylvania, centered on the city of Pittsburgh. Also, it can potentially appear in some speakers as far north as Erie County, as far east as Harrisburg, as far south as Clarksburg, West Virginia, and as far west as Youngstown, Ohio. The dialect is commonly associated with the white working class of Pittsburgh; users of the dialect are colloquially known as "Yinzers".

== Overview ==
Scots-Irish, Pennsylvania Dutch, Polish, Ukrainian and Croatian immigrants to the area all provided certain loanwords to the dialect (see "Vocabulary" below). Many of the sounds and words found in the dialect are popularly thought to be unique to Pittsburgh, but that is a misconception since the dialect resides throughout the greater part of western Pennsylvania and the surrounding areas. Central Pennsylvania, currently an intersection of several dialect regions, was identified in 1949 by Hans Kurath as a subregion between western and eastern Pennsylvania, but some scholars in the 20th century onwards have identified it within the western Pennsylvania dialect region. Since Kurath's study, one of western Pennsylvania's defining features, the cot–caught merger, has expanded into central Pennsylvania, moving eastward until being blocked at Harrisburg. Perhaps the only feature whose distribution is restricted almost exclusively to the immediate vicinity of Pittsburgh is /aʊ/ monophthongization in which words such as house, down, found, and sauerkraut are sometimes pronounced with an "ah" sound, instead of the more standard pronunciation of "ow", rendering eye spellings such as hahs, dahn, fahnd, and sahrkraht.

Speakers of Pittsburgh English are sometimes called "Yinzers" in reference to their use of the second-person plural pronoun "yinz." The word "yinzer" is sometimes heard as pejorative, indicating a lack of sophistication, but the term is now used in a variety of ways. Older men are more likely to use the accent than women "possibly because of a stronger interest in displaying local identity...."

== Phonology ==
Vowels of Western Pennsylvania English
	Front		Central	Back	
	lax	tense	lax	lax	tense
Close	ɪ	i		ʊ	u
Mid	ɛ		ə		
Open	æ			ʌ	ɒ
Diphthongs	eɪ aɪ ɔɪ aʊ oʊ				

A defining feature of Western Pennsylvania English is the cot–caught merger, in which /ɑ/ (as in ah) and /ɔ/ (as in aw) merge to a rounded /ɒ/ (phonetically [ɒ~ɔ]). As in most other American dialects, the father–bother merger also occurs. Therefore, cot and caught are both pronounced /kɒt/; Don and dawn are both /dɒn/. While the merger of the low back vowels is also widespread elsewhere in the United States, the rounded realizations of the merged vowel around [ɒ] is less common, except in Canada, California and Northeastern New England.

/ɒ/ has a stylistic variant, which is open central unrounded [ä], as in the sarcastic pronunciation of I apologize as [aɪ əˈpʰäɫɨdʒaɪz]. It may also occur before /r/, as in start [stäɹʔt] or car [kʰäɹ], but a more common pronunciation is back and rounded: [stɒɹʔt] etc. The vowel in hoarse is the same as the one in horse, phonetically [ɔ]: [hɔɹs] but phonemically /oʊ/ due to the cot-caught merger: /hoʊrs/.

/ʌ/ is backer and more open than [ɜ] found in Midland American English, being closer to [ɑ]. This makes STRUT an unrounded counterpart of LOT, with pairs such as nut [nɑʔt] vs. not [nɒʔt] or cut [kʰɑʔt] vs. cot [kʰɒʔt] contrasting mainly by roundedness. This is also found in contemporary Standard Southern British English, where nut [nʌʔt] also differs from not [nɔʔt] by rounding (though nought has a contrastive THOUGHT vowel instead: [no̞ːʔt], which falls together with [ɒ] in Pittsburgh). Earlier reports give [ɜ] as the norm for STRUT in Pittsburgh. The remaining checked vowels /ɪ/, /ʊ/, /ɛ/ and /æ/ are all within the General American norm.

The GOAT vowel often has an unrounded central or fronted starting point in Pittsburgh: [əʊ]. Outside of the city itself, [oʊ] is more common. GOOSE is sometimes also fronted, to [ɨu] (more usual value: [ʊu]). As in other American dialects, FLEECE and FACE are narrow diphthongs [ɪi, ee̝]. CHOICE is also within the GenAm norm: [ɔ̟ɪ].

The PRICE vowel alone undergoes Canadian raising to [ɜɪ] before voiceless consonants, as in ice [ɜɪs]. In 1971, the Journal of the International Phonetic Association published a description of the dialect, whose author Bruce Lee Johnson notes that the auxiliary verb might is typically pronounced with nasalization, as [mɜ̃ɪ̃ʔt]. Elsewhere in the article, this allophone is transcribed ⟨ʌɪ⟩, following its usual transcription on Wikipedia.

The MOUTH vowel typically begins front in the mouth [æʊ]. A less common variant has a central starting point, [äʊ], matching the starting point of PRICE ([äɪ]). It is monophthongized to [aː] in some environments (sounding instead like ah), namely: before nasal consonants (downtown [daːnˈtʰaːn] and found [faːnd]), liquid consonants (fowl, hour) and obstruents (house [haːs], out, cloudy). The monophthongization does not occur, however, in word-final positions (how, now), and the diphthong then remains [æʊ]. That is one of the few features, if not the only one, restricted almost exclusively to western Pennsylvania in North America, but it can sometimes be found in other accents of the English-speaking world, such as Cockney and South African English. Monophthongization also occurs for the sound /aɪ/, as in eye, before liquid consonants, so that tile is pronounced [tʰɑːɫ]; pile is pronounced [pʰɑːɫ]; and iron is pronounced [ɑːɹn]. That phenomenon allows tire to merge with the sound of tar: [tʰɑːɹ].

The NURSE vowel (phonemically an /ər/ sequence) is phonetically close-mid [ɘ˞].

Johnson notes a tendency to diphthongize /æ/ to [ɛə] not only before nasals (as in GenAm) but also before all voiced consonants (as in bad [bɛəd]) and voiceless fricatives (as in grass [ɡɹɛəs]). This has since been reversed and now [ɛə] is confined to the environment of a following nasal, matching the GenAm allophony.

An epenthetic (intruding) /r/ sound may occur after vowels in a few words, such as water pronounced as [ˈwɔɹɾɚ], and wash as [wɔɹʃ].

A number of vowel mergers occur uniquely in Western Pennsylvania English before the consonant /l/. The pair of vowels /i/ and /ɪ/ may merge before the /l/ consonant, causing both steel and still to be pronounced as something like [stɪɫ]. Similarly, /u/, /oʊ/, and /ʊ/ may merge before /l/, so that pool, pull, and pole may merge to something like [pʰʊɫ]. On the /il/~/ɪl/ merger, Labov, Ash and Boberg (2006) note "the stereotype of merger of /ɪl ~ il/ is based only on a close approximation of some forms, and does not represent the underlying norms of the dialect." The /i/~/ɪ/ merger is found in western Pennsylvania, as well as parts of the southern United States, including Alabama, Texas and the west (McElhinny 1999). On the other hand, the /u/~/ʊ/ merger is consistently found only in western Pennsylvania. The /i/~/ɪ/ merger towards [ɪ] may also appear before /ɡ/: eagle then sounds to outsiders like iggle.

L-vocalization is also common in the Western Pennsylvania dialect; an /l/ then sounds like a /w/ or a cross between a vowel and a "dark" /l/ at the end of a syllable. For example, well is pronounced as [wɛw]; milk as [mɪwk] or [mɛwk]; role as [ɹʊw]; and cold as [ˈkʰʊwd]. The phenomenon is also common in African-American English.

The word mirror can be pronounced as the single-syllable mere.

Western Pennsylvania English speakers may use falling intonation at the end of questions, for example, in "Are you painting your garage?" [↗ˈɒɹ jə ˈpʰeɪɾ̃ɪŋ jɚ ɡə↘ˈɹɒdʒ] (with pitch rising in intonation up to just before the last syllable and then falling precipitously). Such speakers typically use falling pitch for yes–no questions for which they already are quite sure of the answer. A speaker uttering the above example is simply confirming what is already thought: yes, the person spoken to is painting their garage. It is most common in areas of heavy German settlement, especially southeastern Pennsylvania, hence its nickname, the "Pennsylvania Dutch question", but it is also found elsewhere in Pennsylvania, including Pittsburgh. It is of German origin.

== Vocabulary ==
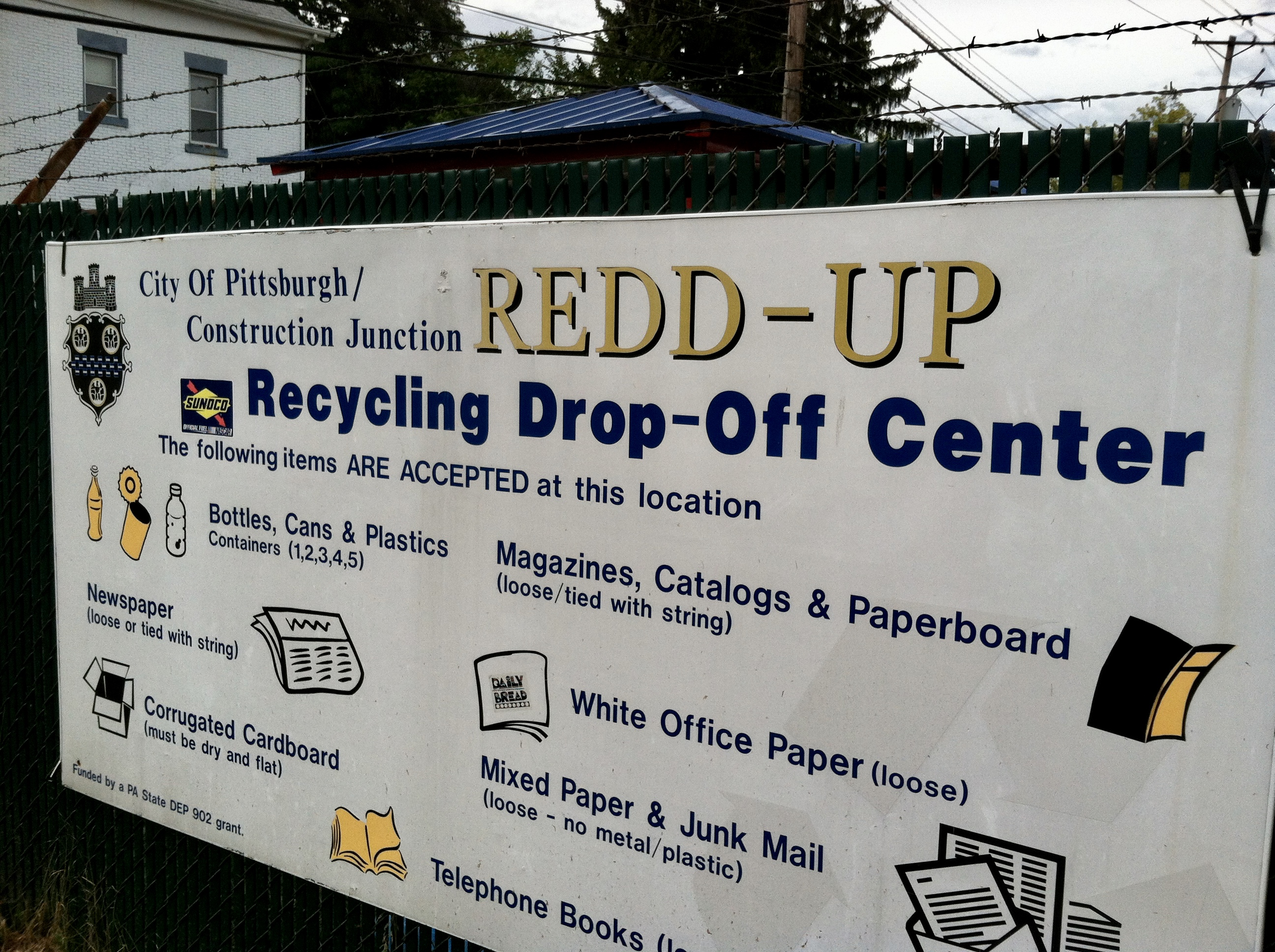
City of Pittsburgh Recycling Drop-Off Center sign using the term "redd up", illustrating an example of Western Pennsylvania English.

- babushka - (n.) headscarf (Note: In Russian, Slovak, and many other Slavic languages, the word babushka (a familial/cute extension of the word baba) means "grandmother" or (endearingly) "old woman." In Pittsburgh and much Northern U.S. English, the word also denotes a type of headscarf that might be worn by an old woman. Predominantly used in the northeast United States, babushka is most heavily in Pennsylvania, Ohio, Indiana, Illinois, Wisconsin, and Michigan. It is sometimes used as a derogatory term for an elderly woman, similar to calling someone an "old hag.")
- buggy - (n.) shopping cart (Note: Kurath (1949) mentions that speakers in a large portion of Pennsylvania use the term, but that it is "very common in the Pittsburgh area[,]...[in] the adjoining counties of Ohio and on the lower Kanawha")
  - baby buggy - (n.) baby carriage
- the 'Burgh - (n.) Pittsburgh
- beal - (v.) to fester or suppurate
- bealed - (adj.) usually of an ear: infected or abscessed
- belling - (n.) noisy celebration or mock serenade for newlyweds; a shivaree
- berm - (n.) edge of the road, curb: an accepted alternative to "shoulder of the road"
- carbon oil - (n.) kerosene (Note: According to Kurath (1949), this may be heard from the western edge of the Alleghenies to beyond the Ohio line)
- chipped ham - (n.) very thinly sliced chopped ham loaf for sandwiches (from a local brand name) (see chipped chopped ham)
- city chicken - (n.) cubes of pork loin and/or veal on a short wooden skewer, breaded, then fried or baked (Note: This is heard in Southwestern Pennsylvania and Northern West Virginia. It origins are not entirely known, but rumored to have begun during the Depression Era, when people took meat scraps and fashioned a makeshift drumstick out of them.)
- cubberd - (n.) closet
- craw - (n.) crawfish
- crick - (n.) Creek
- cruds, crudded milk, or cruddled milk - (n.) cottage cheese (Note: Kurath (1949) claims these forms are used from the western edge of the Alleghenies to beyond the Ohio line; and Crozier claims that they are restricted to southwestern Pennsylvania, from Scots-Irish English origins.)
- diamond - (n.) town square
- dippy - (adj.) appropriate for dipping into, such as gravy, coffee, egg yolks, etc.
- doll baby - (n.) complimentary term for an attractively childlike girl or woman (reversal of "baby doll")
- drooth - (n.) drought
- Dubbya - (n.) Letter "W", Often used when saying "www." Or a local station
- dupa - (n.) parental term (of Polish origin) for a child's backside
- feature - (v.) to think about, understand, or imagine
- grinnie - (n.) chipmunk (Note: Kurath 1949): This term is used from the western edge of the Alleghenies to beyond the Ohio line.)
- gumband - (n.) rubber band; elastic fastener
- gutchies; or undergutchies (n.) term used to describe undergarments of any variety.
- hap - (n.) comfort; or, comforter or quilt: (Note: This can mean "comfort", as in "He's been in poor hap since his wife died", or "comforter or quilt," as in "It was cold last night but that hap kept me warm." Hap is used for "comfort" in western Pennsylvania; and a "quilt" is known as a hap only in western Pennsylvania.)
- hoagie - (n.) a sub (i.e., submarine sandwich; used throughout Pennsylvania)
- hoopy - (n.) a person perceived as unsophisticated or having rural sensibilities (i.e., redneck or hillbilly; used especially in Ohio Valley and northern West Virginia)
- jag - (v.) to prick, stab, or jab; to tease (often, jag off or jag around) (Note: The word is often followed by off to mean (as a verb) "to annoy, irritate, play tricks on; to disparage; to reject", or (as a noun) "an annoying or irritating person;" as well as around to mean "annoy, tease, or engage in a frivolous endeavor." These phrases are probably influenced by jack off and jack around, respectively. "Jus' jaggin'" is a common expression, the same as standard "just kidding". Descended from Scots-Irish usage in English, this is chiefly a Pennsylvania term, especially southwestern Pennsylvania, but also portions of Appalachia.)
  - jagger - (n./adj.) any small, sharp-pointed object or implement, usually thorns, spines, and prickles (as in a jagger bush or "I got a jagger in my finger").
  - jaggerbush - (n.) briar
  - jagoff - (n.) an idiot, fool, or unlikeable person
- jimmies - (n.) sprinkles
- jumbo - (n.) bologna lunch meat
- "Kennywood's open" - idiom used to inform someone that their fly is open ("Kennywood" referring to the Kennywood amusement park in West Mifflin, Pennsylvania)
- Klondike - (n.) any ice cream bar, even if not specifically a Klondike bar (first marketed in nearby Youngstown, Ohio).
- kolbusy or kolbassi - (n.) variant pronunciation of kielbasa (/kʊlˈbɒsi/) (Note: The OED (1991) lists kolbasa as a variable pronunciation of kielbasa, and notes that the former pronunciation is Polish and the latter Russian.)
- monkey ball - (n.) fruit of the Maclura pomifera or monkey ball tree
- n'at (/əˈnæt/) - et cetera; and so on; a "general extender"; literally, a contraction of "and (all) that" (Note: The distribution of n'at is Southwestern Pennsylvania, possibly Scots-Irish. Macaulay (1995) finds it in the regular speech and narratives of Scottish coal miners in Glasgow, a principal area from which Scottish settlers emigrated to Northern Ireland, and from there, to the American colonies.)
- neb - (v.) to pry into a conversation or argument intrusively or impertinently (this term and its derivatives are common to Pennsylvania, but especially southwestern Pennsylvania, from Scots-Irish English)
  - neb out - to mind one's own business
  - neb-nose or nebby-nose (also nebshit) - (n.) the kind of person who is always poking into people's affairs; inquisitive person
  - nebby - (adj.) given to prying into the affairs of others; nosey; inquisitive
- onion snow - (n.) early spring snow
- redd up (also ret, rid, ridd, or redd out) - (v.) to tidy up, clean up, or clean out (a room, house, cupboard, etc.); to clean house, tidy up (hence v bl. redding up house-cleaning; tidying up) (Note: An example of this term is "Yinz better redd up this room". Dressman notes that it is common to the Pittsburgh area and throughout Pennsylvania, but less so in Philadelphia. It is also scattered about New England States and in New Brunswick, though its occurrence is heaviest in Pennsylvania. Hall states that its distribution is "scattered, but chiefly N. Midland, esp PA". Dressman suggested that it was brought to the U.S. by Scots. It's almost certainly of Scandinavian/Viking origin; the Danish "rydde op" means to clean up. "Redd up" and its associated variants probably entered the English language from old Norse.)
- reverend - (adj.) extreme; extraordinary, powerful
- slippy - (adj.) slippery (from Scots-Irish English)
- spicket - (n.) alternate pronunciation of spigot, specifically an outdoor faucet used to connect to a garden hose
- Squill - (n.) shortening of Squirrel Hill.
- Stillers - (n.) alternate pronunciation of the Pittsburgh Steelers
- sweep - (v.) to vacuum
- sweeper - (n.) vacuum cleaner (also used in Ohio and Indiana; from carpet sweeper)
- tossle cap - (n.) knit hat designed to provide warmth in cold weather
- trick - (n.) a job shift (as used in West-Central Pennsylvania)
- yins, yinz, yunz, you'uns, or youns - (pronoun) plural of you (second-person personal plural pronoun from Scots-Irish English)

== Grammar ==
- All to mean all gone: When referring to consumable products, the word all has a secondary meaning: all gone. For example, the phrase the butter's all would be understood as "the butter is all gone." This likely derives from German.
- "Positive anymore": In addition to the normal negative use of anymore it can also, as in the greater Midland U.S. dialect, be used in a positive sense to mean "these days" or "nowadays". An example is "I wear these shoes a lot anymore". While in Standard English anymore must be used as a negative polarity item (NPI), some speakers in Pittsburgh and throughout the Midland area do not have this restriction. This is somewhat common in both the Midland regions (Montgomery 1989) and in northern Maryland (Frederick, Hagerstown, and Westminster), likely of Scots-Irish origin.
- Reversed usage of leave and let: Examples of this include "Leave him go outside" and "Let the book on the table". Leave is used in some contexts in which, in standard English, let would be used; and vice versa. Used in Southwestern Pennsylvania and elsewhere, this is either Pennsylvania Dutch or Scots-Irish.
- "Need, want, or like + past participle": Examples of this include "The car needs washed", "The cat wants petted", and "Babies like cuddled". More common constructions are "The grass needs cutting" or "The grass needs to be cut" or "Babies like cuddling" or "Babies like to be cuddled"; "The car needs washing" or "The car needs to be washed"; and "The cat wants petting" or "The cat wants to be petted." Found predominantly in the North Midland region, this is especially common in southwestern Pennsylvania. Need + past participle is the most common construction, followed by want + past participle, and then like + past participle. The forms are "implicationally related" to one another (Murray and Simon 2002). This means the existence of a less common construction from the list in a given location entails the existence of the more common ones there, but not vice versa. The constructions "like + past participle" and "need + past participle" are Scots-Irish. While Adams argues that "want + past participle" could be from Scots-Irish or German, it seems likely that this construction is Scots-Irish, as Murray and Simon claim. like and need + past participle are Scots-Irish, the distributions of all three constructions are implicationally related, the area where they are predominantly found is most heavily influenced by Scots-Irish, and a related construction, "want + directional adverb", as in "The cat wants out", is Scots-Irish.
- "Punctual whenever": "Whenever" is often used to mean "at the time that." An example is "My mother, whenever she passed away, she had pneumonia." A punctual descriptor refers to the use of the word for "a onetime momentary event rather than in its two common uses for a recurrent event or a conditional one". This Scots-Irish usage is found in the Midlands and the South.

== Notable lifelong speakers ==
- Jerry Angelo
- Kurt Angle
- Tom Bradley
- Steve Byrne
- Myron Cope – Cope's colorful vocabulary added dozens of words to the dialect, including his most famous, "Yoi!"
- Bill Cowher
- Mike Ditka
- Rich Fitzgerald
- Billy Gardell – Although he grew up some of the time away from the city, Gardell sports a heavy Pittsburgh accent.
- John Kasich
- Michael Keaton
- Joe Manganiello
- Dan Marino
- Sophie Masloff
- Billy Mays
- Pat McAfee
- Arnold Palmer
- Trent Reznor
- Fred Rogers – Rogers' accent is an example of the softer variation of the accent that was spoken by the middle class of the era that he grew up in.
- Art Rooney
- Dan M. Rooney
- Dave Wannstedt

== See also ==
- Jagoff
- Midland American English
- Pennsylvania Dutch English
- Philadelphia accent
- Pittsburgh Dad
- Regional vocabularies of American English

== Bibliography ==
- Brown, C. (1982). A search for sound change: A look at the lowering of tense vowels before liquids in the Pittsburgh area (MA thesis). Pittsburgh: University of Pittsburgh.
- Cruttenden, Alan (2014). Gimson's Pronunciation of English (8th ed.). Routledge. ISBN 9781444183092.
- Duncan, Daniel (2016). Hansson, Gunnar Ólafur; Farris-Trimble, Ashley; McMullin, Kevin; Pulleyblank, Douglas (eds.). "'Tense' /æ/ Is still lax: A phonotactics study". Proceedings of the Annual Meetings on Phonology. 3. Washington, D.C.: Linguistic Society of America. doi:10.3765/amp.v3i0.3653.
- Johnson, Bruce Lee (1971), "The Western Pennsylvania dialect of American English", Journal of the International Phonetic Association, 1 (2): 69–73, doi:10.1017/S0025100300000268, JSTOR 44526647, S2CID 146649800
- Johnstone, B.; Andrus, J.; Danielson, A. (2006). "Mobility, indexicality, and the enregisterment of "Pittsburghese"". Journal of English Linguistics. 34 (2): 77–104. doi:10.1177/0075424206290692. S2CID 3851451.
- Labov, William; Ash, Sharon; Boberg, Charles (2006), The Atlas of North American English, Berlin: Mouton-de Gruyter, pp. 187–208, ISBN 978-3-11-016746-7
- Layton, N. N. (1999). The dialect of western Pennsylvania: evaluation of ten sounds (MA thesis). Gothenburg, Sweden: University of Gothenburg.
- Maxfield, E. K. (1931). "The speech of south-western Pennsylvania". American Speech. 7 (1): 18–20. doi:10.2307/451308. JSTOR 451308.
- McElhinny, B (1999). "More on the third dialect of English: linguistic constraints on the use of three phonological variables in Pittsburgh". Language Variation and Change. 11 (2): 171–195. doi:10.1017/s0954394599112031. S2CID 145656857.
- Montgomery, M. B. (1989). "Exploring the roots of Appalachian English". English World-Wide. 10 (2): 227–278. doi:10.1075/eww.10.2.03mon.
- Montgomery, M. B. (2001). "'My mother, whenever she died, she had pneumonia': The history and functions of whenever". Journal of English Linguistics. 29 (3): 234–249. doi:10.1177/00754240122005350. S2CID 143776545.
- Murray, T. E.; Frazer, T. C.; Simon, B. L. (1996). "Need + past participle in American English". American Speech. 71 (3): 255–271. doi:10.2307/455549. JSTOR 455549.
- Murray, T. E.; Simon, B. L. (1999). "Want + past participle in American English". American Speech. 74 (2): 140–164. JSTOR 455576.
- Murray, T. E.; Simon, B. L. (2002). "At the intersection of regional and social dialects: the case of like + past participle in American English". American Speech. 77 (1): 32–69. doi:10.1215/00031283-77-1-32. S2CID 143892781.
- Wells, John C. (1982). Accents of English. Vol. 3: Beyond the British Isles (pp. i–xx, 467–674). Cambridge University Press. doi:10.1017/CBO9780511611766. ISBN 0-52128541-0.
- Wisnosky, M. (2003). 'Pittsburghese' in Pittsburgh humor (MA thesis). Pittsburgh: University of Pittsburgh.
