= Barbara Johnstone =

American professor of rhetoric and linguistics

- Born: March 24, 1952 (age 73)
- Occupations: Professor, Carnegie Mellon University
- Known for: Scholar of discourse studies

Barbara Johnstone (born March 24, 1952) is an American professor of rhetoric and linguistics at Carnegie Mellon University. She specializes in discourse structure and function, sociolinguistics, rhetorical theory, and methods of text analysis. She was the editor in chief of Language in Society from 2005 to 2013, and is the editor of Pittsburgh Speech & Society, a website about Pittsburgh English for non-linguists. She has published several books, including Speaking Pittsburghese (2013) and Discourse Analysis, 2nd Ed. (2008). She has also written for The New York Times.

== Education ==
Johnstone received her bachelor of arts in linguistics from Yale University. She received her master's and her doctorate in linguistics at the University of Michigan.

== Career ==
She taught at Indiana University – Purdue University Fort Wayne (1981-1985), Georgetown University (1985-1987), and Texas A&M University (1987-1997), followed by her current position of professor of rhetoric and linguistics at Carnegie Mellon University since 1997.

Johnstone has also published papers on gender and language, Arabic language discourse, as well as many other linguistic topics. On top of that, she also wrote a book called the "Linguistic Individual," discussing self-expression in language.

=== Research on Pittsburghese ===
Johnstone is recognized as an expert on Pittsburgh English, locally known as "Pittsburghese." Her research is concerned with how the dialect is "constructed through local talk, and talk about talk," connecting "people's understandings of language and place" with language change. Her 2013 book Speaking Pittsburghese: The Story of a Dialect, is a summation of her scholarly work on Pittsburgh English. The book is a sociolinguistic analysis of the history of Pittsburgh English and how it has changed over time, with a focus on the process of enregisterment and how the dialect is linked to local identity. It also explores the history and local use of some of Pittsburgh's most emblematic words, including "yinz," "nebby," and "dahntahn." Johnstone also focuses on phonological features of "pittsburghese" such as the monophthongal /aw/.

=== Research on Texas women ===
Johnstone has written about style-shifting among Texas women. In her article, "Uses of southern-sounding speech by contemporary Texas women", Johnstone delves into how Texas women use different ways of talking, which range from "automatic and nonstrategic" to "very planned and strategic".

In another article, titled "Sociolinguistic Resources, Individual Identities, and Public Speech Styles of Texas Women", Johnstone studied how women in Texas form linguistic identities based on their own individual backgrounds, such as ethnicity, region of living, as well as the linguistic models they experienced in their lives.
