= Charles Boberg =

American linguist

Charles S. Boberg (born 1964) is an academic specializing in sociolinguistics, particularly North American English with a special focus on Canadian English. He is a professor of linguistics at McGill University in Montreal.

Boberg was born in 1964 at Northfield, Minnesota, to a Canadian father and British mother. His father, Einer Boberg, was a professor at the University of Alberta in Edmonton, where he grew up and attended primary schooling. He attended the University of Alberta with a Bachelor of Arts degree in 1986. He studied at the University of Pennsylvania under William Labov, and later collaborated with him and Sharon Ash in the preparation of The Atlas of North American English, published by De Gruyter in 2006. Boberg has been consulted on matters of national security because of his expertise in identifying regional dialects and vocabulary patterns of North American English.

== Books ==
- William Labov, Sharon Ash, Charles Boberg (2006).The Atlas of North American English: Phonetics, Phonology and Sound Change. Berlin; New York: Mouton de Gruyter.
- Charles Boberg (2010). The English Language in Canada: Status, History and Comparative Analysis. Cambridge: Cambridge University Press.
- Charles Boberg (2021). Accent in North American Film and Television: A Sociophonetic Analysis. Cambridge: Cambridge University Press.
