= Palatalization (sound change) =

Systematic shifting of speech sounds toward the hard palate

Palatalization (/ˌpælətəlaɪˈzeɪʃən/ PAL-ə-təl-eye-ZAY-shən) is a historical-linguistic sound change that results in a palatalized articulation of a consonant or, in certain cases, a front vowel. Palatalization involves change in the place or manner of articulation of consonants, or the fronting or raising of vowels. In some cases, palatalization involves assimilation or lenition.

== Types ==
Palatalization is sometimes an example of assimilation. In some cases, it is triggered by a palatal or palatalized consonant or front vowel, but in other cases, it is not conditioned in any way.

=== Consonant ===
Palatalization changes place of articulation or manner of articulation of consonants. It may add palatal secondary articulation or change primary articulation from velar to palatal or alveolar, alveolar to postalveolar.

It may also cause a consonant to change its manner of articulation from stop to affricate or fricative. The change in the manner of articulation is a form of lenition. However, the lenition is frequently accompanied by a change in place of articulation.

- [k] > [kʲ], [c], [tʃ], [ts], [ʃ], [s]

Palatalization of velar consonants commonly causes them to front, and apical and coronal consonants are usually raised. In the process, stop consonants are often spirantised except for palatalized labials.

Palatalization, as a sound change, is usually triggered only by mid and close (high) front vowels and the semivowel [j]. The sound that results from palatalization may vary from language to language. For example, palatalization of [t] may produce [tʲ], [tʃ], [tɕ], [tsʲ], [ts], etc. A change from [t] to [tʃ] may pass through [tʲ] as an intermediate state, but there is no requirement for that to happen.

In the Nupe language, /s/ and /z/ are palatalized both before front vowels and /j/, while velars are only palatalized before front vowels. In Ciluba, /j/ palatalizes only a preceding /t/, /s/, /l/ or /n/. In some variants of Ojibwe, velars are palatalized before /j/, but apicals are not. In Indo-Aryan languages, dentals and /r/ are palatalized when occurring in clusters before /j/, but velars are not.

=== Vowel ===
Palatalization sometimes refers to vowel shifts, the fronting of a back vowel or raising of a front vowel. The shifts are sometimes triggered by a nearby palatal or palatalized consonant or by a high front vowel. The Germanic umlaut is a famous example.

A similar change is reconstructed in the history of Old French in which Bartsch's law turned open vowels into [e] or [ɛ] after a palatalized velar consonant. If it was true for all open vowels in Old French, it would explain the palatalization of velar plosives before /a/.

In Erzya, a Uralic language, the open vowel [a] is raised to near-open [æ] after a palatalized consonant, as in the name of the language, [erzʲæ].

In Russian, the back vowels /u o/ are fronted to central [ʉ ɵ], and the open vowel /a/ is raised to near-open [æ], near palatalized consonants. The palatalized consonants also factor in how unstressed vowels are reduced.

=== Unconditioned ===
Palatalization is sometimes unconditioned or spontaneous, not triggered by a palatal or palatalized consonant or front vowel.

In southwestern Romance, clusters of a voiceless obstruent with /l/ were palatalized once or twice. This first palatalization was unconditioned. It resulted in a cluster with a palatal lateral [ʎ], a palatal lateral on its own, or a cluster with a palatal approximant [j]. In a second palatalization, the /k/ was affricated to [tʃ] or spirantized to [ʃ].

- Vulgar Latin clāmāre "to call" > Aromanian cl'imari /kʎimari/, Aragonese clamar /kʎamar/, Spanish llamar /ʎamar/ (>/ʝamar/), Italian chiamare /kjaˈmare/

> Istriot ciamà /tʃaˈma/, Portuguese chamar /ʃɐˈmaɾ/

In the Western Romance languages, Latin [kt] was palatalized once or twice. The first palatalization was unconditioned: the /k/ was vocalized to [i̯t] or spirantized to [çt]. In a second palatalization, the /t/ was affricated to [tʃ]:

- Vulgar Latin noctem "night" > French nuit [nɥi], Portuguese noite [ˈnoj.tɨ]/[ˈnoj.t͡ʃ(i)], eastern Occitan nuèit, Catalan nit (Old Catalan nuit), Mozarabic noxte /noçte/, Galician noite /nojti/

> Spanish noche, western Occitan nuèch, Romansh notg

== Effects ==
=== Allophony and phonemic split ===
Palatalization may result in a phonemic split, a historical change by which a phoneme becomes two new phonemes over time through palatalization.

Old historical splits have frequently drifted since the time they occurred and may be independent of current phonetic palatalization. The lenition tendency of palatalized consonants (by assibilation and deaffrication) is important. According to some analyses, the lenition of the palatalized consonant is still a part of the palatalization process itself.

In Japanese, allophonic palatalization affected the dental plosives /t/ and /d/, turning them into alveolo-palatal affricates [tɕ] and [dʑ] before [i], romanized as ⟨ch⟩ and ⟨j⟩ respectively. Japanese has, however, recently regained phonetic [ti] and [di] from loanwords, and the originally-allophonic palatalization has thus become lexical. A similar change has also happened in Polish and Belarusian. That would also be true about most dialects of Brazilian Portuguese but for the strong phonotactical resistance of its native speakers that turn dental plosives into post-alveolar affricates even in loanwords: McDonald's [mɛkiˈdõnɐwdʒ(is)].

For example, Votic has undergone such a change historically, *keeli → tšeeli 'language', but there is currently an additional distinction between palatalized laminal and non-palatalized apical consonants. An extreme example occurs in Spanish, whose palatalized ('soft') g has ended up as [x] from a long process where Latin /ɡ/ became palatalized to [ɡʲ] (Late Latin) and then affricated to [dʒ] (Proto-Romance), deaffricated to [ʒ] (Old Spanish), devoiced to [ʃ] (16th century), and finally retracted to a velar, giving [x] (c. 1650). (See History of the Spanish language and Phonological history of Spanish coronal fricatives for more information).

== Examples ==
Palatalization has played a major role in the history of English, and of other languages and language groups throughout the world, such as the Slavic languages.

=== English ===
==== Anglo-Frisian ====
In Anglo-Frisian, the language that gave rise to English and the Frisian languages, the velar stops /k ɡ/ and the consonant cluster /sk/ were palatalized in certain cases and became the sounds /tʃ/, /dʒ/, /j/, and /ʃ/. Many words with Anglo-Frisian palatalization survive in Modern English, and the palatalized sounds are typically spelled ⟨ch⟩, ⟨(d)ge⟩, ⟨y⟩, and ⟨sh⟩ in Modern English.

Palatalization only occurred in certain environments, and so it did not apply to all words from the same root. This is the origin of some alternations in cognate words, such as speak and speech /ˈspiːk, ˈspiːtʃ/, cold and chill /ˈkoʊld, ˈtʃɪl/, burrow and bury /ˈbʌroʊ, ˈbɛri/, dawn and day /ˈdɔːn, ˈdeɪ/. Here ⟨k⟩ originates from unpalatalized /k/ and ⟨w⟩ from unpalatalized /ɡ/.

Some English words with palatalization have unpalatalized doublets from the Northumbrian dialect and from Old Norse, such as shirt and skirt /ˈʃərt, ˈskərt/, church and kirk /ˈtʃɜrtʃ, ˈkɜrk/, ditch and dike /ˈdɪtʃ, ˈdaɪk/. German only underwent palatalization of /sk/: cheese /tʃiːz/ and Käse /kɛːzə/; lie /ˈlaɪ/ and liegen /ˈliːɡən/; lay /ˈleɪ/ and legen /ˈleːɡən/; fish and Fisch /fɪʃ/.

The pronunciation of wicca as [ˈwɪkə] with a hard ⟨c⟩ is a spelling pronunciation, since the actual Old English pronunciation gave rise to witch.

==== Other ====
Others include the following:

- Palatisation of /s/ to /ʃ/ in modern English

In some English-speaking areas, the sound /s/ changed to /ʃ/, like for example in the words Worcestershire (/wʊs.tɚ.ʃiɹ/ to /wʊʃ.tɚ.ʃiɹ/) and Association (/əˌsoʊsiˈeɪʃən/ to /əˌsoʊʃiˈeɪʃən/). Various other examples include asphalt, (to) assume.

- Rhotic palatalization:

This is found in non-rhotic dialects of New York City, according to Labov, triggered by the loss of the coil–curl merger. It results in the palatalization of /ɜːr/. Labov never specified the resultant vowel.)

- In Glasgow and some other urban Scottish accents, /s/ is given an apico-alveolar articulation, which auditorily gives an impression of a retracted pronunciation similar to /ʃ/.

=== Semitic languages ===
==== Arabic ====
===== Historical =====
While in most Semitic languages, e.g. Aramaic, Hebrew, Ge'ez the Gimel represents a [ɡ], Arabic is considered unique among them where the Gimel was palatalized in most dialects to Jīm ⟨ج⟩ an affricate [d͡ʒ] or further into a fricative [ʒ]. While there is variation in Modern Arabic varieties, most of them reflect this palatalized pronunciation except in Egyptian Arabic and a number of Yemeni and Omani dialects, where it is pronounced as [ɡ]. It is not well known when this change occurred or if it is connected to the pronunciation of Qāf ⟨ق⟩ as a [ɡ], but in most of the Arabian peninsula which is the homeland of the Arabic language, the ⟨ج⟩ represents a [d͡ʒ] and ⟨ق⟩ represents a [ɡ], except in western and southern Yemen and parts of Oman where ⟨ج⟩ represents a [ɡ] and ⟨ق⟩ represents a [q], which shows a strong correlation between the palatalization of ⟨ج⟩ to [d͡ʒ] and the pronunciation of the ⟨ق⟩ as a [ɡ] as shown in the table below:

Language / Arabic Dialects	Pronunciation of the letters	
Language / Arabic Dialects	ج	ق
Proto-Semitic	/ɡ/	/kʼ/
Parts of Southern Arabia	/ɡ/	/q/
Most Arabian Peninsular Dialects	/d͡ʒ/	/ɡ/
Modern Standard Arabic	/d͡ʒ/	/q/

===== Modern Arabic dialects =====
Some modern Arabic varieties developed palatalization of ⟨ك⟩ (turning [k] into [tʃ], [ts], [ʃ], or [s]), ⟨ق⟩ (turning [ɡ~q] into [dʒ] or [dz]) and ⟨ج⟩ (turning [d͡ʒ] into [j]), usually when adjacent to front vowel, though these palatalizations also occur in other environments as well. These three palatalizations occur in a variety of dialects, including Iraqi, rural Levantine varieties (e.g. rural Palestinian), a number of Gulf Arabic dialects, such as Kuwaiti, Qatari, Bahraini, and Emarati, as well as others like Najdi, parts of Oman, and various Bedouin dialects across the Arab World. Examples:

- كلب ('dog') /**k**alb/ > Gulf [**t͡ʃ**alb], Iraqi [**t͡ʃ**alɪb], and traditional Najdi [**t͡s**alb].
- ديك ('rooster') /diː**k**/ > rural Palestinian [diː**t͡ʃ**]
- الشارقة ('Sharjah') /aʃːaːri**q**a/ > Gulf [əʃːɑːr**d͡ʒ**ɑ] while other neighboring dialects pronounce it [aʃːaːr**g**a] without palatalization.
- جديد ('new') /**d͡ʒ**adiːd/ > Gulf [**j**ɪdiːd]
- قربة ('water container') /**q**irba/ > traditional Najdi [**d͡z**ərba], although this phenomenon is fading among the younger generations where قربة is pronounced [**g**ɪrba] like in most other dialects in Saudi Arabia.

Palatalization occurs in the pronunciation of the second person feminine singular pronoun in those dialects. For instance:

Classical Arabic عَيْنُكِ 'your eye' (to a female) /ʕajnuki/ is pronounced:

- [ʕeːnət͡ʃ] in Gulf, Iraqi, and rural levantine dialects (e.g. rural Palestinian)
- [ʕeːnət͡s] in traditional Najdi and a number of bedouin dialects.
- [ʕeːnəʃ] or [ʕeːnəs] in some southern dialects in Saudi Arabia and Yemen.

Speakers in these dialects that do not use the palatalization would merge the feminine and masculine suffix pronouns e.g. عينك [ʕe̞ːnək] ('your eye' to a male/female) as opposed to Classical Arabic /ʕajnuka/ عَيْنُكَ ('your eye' to a male) and /ʕajnuki/ عَيْنُكِ ('your eye' to a female) and most other modern urban dialects /ʕeːnak/ (to a male) and /ʕeːnik/ (to a female).

==== Assyrian Neo-Aramaic ====
Assyrian Neo-Aramaic features the palatalization of kaph (turning /k/ into [tʃ]), taw (turning /t/ into [ʃ]) and gimel (turning /ɡ/ into [dʒ]), albeit in some dialects only and seldom in the standardized version of the language.

- In the Upper Tyari dialects, /t/ in a stressed syllable is palatalized and replaced with [ʃ] (e.g. beta, 'house' [bɛʃa]).
- /k/ may be palatalized to [tʃ] among Assyrians who originate from Urmia; Iran; and Nochiya, southeastern Turkey.
- In Urmian and some Tyari dialects, /ɡ/ is palatalized to [dʒ].

=== Romance languages ===
The Romance languages developed from Vulgar Latin, the colloquial form of Latin spoken in the Roman Empire. Various palatalizations occurred during the historical development of the Romance languages. Some groups of the Romance languages underwent more palatalizations than others. One palatalization affected all groups, some palatalizations affected most groups, and one affected only a few groups.

==== Gallo-Romance ====
In Gallo-Romance, Vulgar Latin *[ka] became *[tʃa] very early (and then in French became [ʃa]), with the subsequent deaffrication and some further developments of the vowel. A parallel development affected *[ɡa], which became *[dʒa] (written ⟨j⟩ or ⟨g⟩) and then [ʒa] in French. For instance:

- cattus "cat" > chat /ʃa/
- calva "bald" (fem.) > chauve /ʃov/
- *blanca "white" (fem.) > blanche /blɑ̃ʃ/
- catēna "chain" > chaîne /ʃɛn/
- carus "dear" > cher /ʃɛʁ/

And :

- gamba "leg" > jambe /ʒɑ̃b/
- galbĭnus "yellowish" > jaune /ʒon/
- gabata "bowl" > jatte /ʒat/
- gaudia "joys" > joie /ʒwa/

Early English borrowings from French show the original affricate, as chamber /ˈtʃeɪmbəɾ/ "(private) room" < Old French chambre /tʃɑ̃mbrə/ < Vulgar Latin camera; compare French chambre /ʃɑ̃bʁ/ "room". Likewise, gauge /ɡeɪdʒ/ < Old French jauge /dʒɑu̯ʒə/ < Frankish *galgō; compare French jauge /ʒoʒ/ "gauge".

==== Mouillé ====
Mouillé (French pronunciation: [muje], "moistened") is a term for palatal consonants in the Romance languages. Palatal consonants in the Romance languages developed from /l/ or /n/ by palatalization.

Spelling of palatal consonants
	l mouillé	n mouillé
Italian	gl(i)	gn
French	il(l)	gn
Occitan	lh	nh
Catalan	ll	ny
Spanish	ll	ñ
Portuguese	lh	nh

L and n mouillé have a variety of origins in the Romance languages. In these tables, letters that represent or used to represent /ʎ/ or /ɲ/ are bolded. In French, /ʎ/ merged with /j/ in pronunciation in the 18th century; in most dialects of Spanish, /ʎ/ has merged with /ʝ/. Romanian formerly had both /ʎ/ and /ɲ/, but both have either merged with /j/ or got lost: muliĕr(em) > *muʎere > Romanian muiere /muˈjere/ "woman"; vinĕa > *viɲe > Romanian vie /ˈvi.e/ "vineyard".

Examples of palatal /ʎ/
Latin	meliōr(em) "better"	coag(u)lāre "to coagulate"	auric(u)la "ear"	caballus "horse"	luna "moon"	clavis "key"
Italian	mi**gli**ore	ca**gli**are	orecchia	cavallo	luna	chiave
French	me**ill**eur	ca**ill**er	ore**ill**e	cheval	lune	clé
Piedmontese	mi**j**or	ca**j**é	ori**j**a	caval	lun-a	**ci**av
Occitan	me**lh**or	ca**lh**ar	aure**lh**a	caval	luna	clau
Catalan	mi**ll**or	qua**ll**ar	ore**ll**a	cava**ll**	**ll**una	clau
Spanish	me**j**or (Note: These cases come from the early fricativization of palatal /ʎ/, first into palatal /ʒ/ and ultimately into velar /x/, represented by ⟨j⟩.)	cua**j**ar	ore**j**a	caba**ll**o	luna	**ll**ave
Portuguese	me**lh**or	coa**lh**ar	ore**lh**a	cavalo	lua	chave
Romanian	—	închega	ureche	cal	lună	cheie

Examples of palatal /ɲ/
Latin	seniōr(em) "older"	cognātus "related"	annus "year"	somnus "sleep"	somnium "dream"	ung(u)la "claw"	vinum "wine"
Italian	si**gn**ore	co**gn**ato	anno	sonno	so**gn**o	unghia	vino
French	sei**gn**eur	—	an	somme	songe	ongle	vin
Occitan	se**nh**or	cu**nh**at	an	sòm	sòmi	ongla	vin
Catalan	se**ny**or	cu**ny**at	a**ny**	son	somni	ungla	vi
Spanish	se**ñ**or	cu**ñ**ado	a**ñ**o	sue**ñ**o	sue**ñ**o	u**ñ**a	vino
Portuguese	se**nh**or	cu**nh**ado	ano	sono	so**nh**o	u**nh**a	vi**nh**o
Romanian	—	cumnat	an	somn	—	unghie	vin

=== Satem languages ===
In certain Indo-European language groups, the reconstructed "palato-velars" of Proto-Indo-European *ḱ, *ǵ, *ǵʰ) were palatalized into sibilants. The language groups with and without palatalization are called satem and centum languages, after the characteristic developments of the PIE word for "hundred":

- PIE *(d)ḱm̥tóm > Avestan satəm (palatalization)

Latin centum /ˈkentum/ (no palatalization)

=== Slavic languages ===
The Slavic languages are known for their tendency towards palatalization.

In Proto-Slavic or Common Slavic times the velars *k *g *x experienced three successive palatalizations. In the first palatalization they were fronted to *č *ž *š before the front vowels *e *ē *i *ī. In the second palatalization, the velars changed to *c, *dz or *z, and *s or *š (depending on dialect) before new *ē *ī (either from monophthongization of previous diphthongs or from borrowings). The third palatalization, also called the progressive palatalization, was triggered by a preceding *i or *ī and had the same outcomes as the second palatalization.

In the process of iotation various sounds were also palatalized in front of the semivowel *j. The results vary by language.

In addition, there were further palatalizing sound changes in the various Slavic languages after the break-up of Proto-Slavic. In some of them, including Polish and Russian, most sounds were palatalized by a following front vowel, causing the rise of a phonological contrast between hard (unpalatalized) and soft (palatalized) consonants. In Kashubian and the neighboring Polish dialects the reflexes of PS velars *k *g were palatalized a fourth time before front vowels, resulting in palatal affricates.

=== Sinitic languages ===
In many varieties of Chinese, namely Mandarin, Northern Wu, and several others scattered throughout China, the velar series, /k kʰ x/, were palatalized before the medials /i y/ and shifted to alveolo-palatal series /tɕ tɕʰ ɕ/. So were the alveolar series, /ts tsʰ s/. Alveolo-palatal consonants occur in modern Standard Chinese and are written as ⟨j q x⟩ in Pinyin. Postal romanization does not show palatalized consonants, reflecting the dialect of the imperial court during the Qing dynasty. For instance, the name of the capital of China was formerly spelled Peking, but is now spelled Běijīng [pèɪ.tɕíŋ], and Tientsin and Sian were the former spellings of Tiānjīn [tʰjɛ́n.tɕín] and Xī'ān [ɕí.án].

Locality or Language	Pronunciation 高		Pronunciation 交	
Locality or Language	literary	vernacular	literary	vernacular
Middle Chinese	kɑu (古勞切)		kˠau (古肴切)	
Beijing dialect	꜀kau		꜀tɕiau	
Xi'an dialect	꜀kau		꜀tɕiau	
Taiyuan dialect	꜀kau		꜀tɕiau	
Wuhan dialect	꜀kau		꜀tɕiau	꜀kau
Sichuanese dialect	꜀kau		꜀tɕiau	
Jinan dialect	꜀kɔ		꜀tɕiɔ	
Jianghuai Mandarin (Hefei)	꜀kɔ		꜀tɕiɔ	
Nanjing dialect	꜀kɔ		꜀tɕiɔ	
Jianghuai Mandarin (Yangzhou)	꜀kɔ		꜀tɕiau	꜀kɔ
Shanghainese	꜀kɔ		꜀tɕiɔ	꜀kɔ
Suzhou dialect	꜀kæ		꜀tɕiæ	꜀kæ
Wenzhou dialect	꜀kɜ		꜀kuɔ	
Changsha dialect	꜀kau		꜀tɕiau	
Shuangfeng dialect	꜀kɤ		꜀tɕiɤ	
Meixian dialect	꜀kau		꜀kau, kau꜄	
Nanchang dialect	꜀kau		꜀kau	
Cantonese	꜀kou		꜀kau	
Yangjiang dialect	꜀kou		꜀kau, ꜀kʰau	
Hokkien	꜀ko		꜀kau	꜀ka
Fuzhou dialect	꜀kɔ		꜀kau	꜀ka
Chaozhou dialect	꜀kau	꜀ko	꜀kau	
Jian'ou dialect	꜂au		꜀kau	

== See also ==
- Iotation – Type of sound change in Slavic languages
- Labio-palatalization – Type of secondary articulation
- Raising (sound change) – Systematic raising of the tongue in speech sounds
- Fronting (sound change) – Sound changes
- Soft sign – Letter of the Cyrillic script
- Index of phonetics articles

== Bibliography ==
- Al Motairi, Sarah Soror (2015), An Optimality-Theoretic Analysis of Syllable Structure in Qassimi Arabic
- Bynon, Theodora. Historical Linguistics. Cambridge University Press, 1977. ISBN 0-521-21582-X (hardback) or ISBN 978-0-521-29188-0 (paperback).
- Bhat, D.N.S. (1978), "A General Study of Palatalization", Universals of Human Language, 2: 47–92
- Buckley, E. (2003), "The Phonetic Origin and Phonological Extension of Gallo-Roman Palatalization", Proceedings of the North American Phonology Conferences 1 and 2
- Crowley, Terry. (1997) An Introduction to Historical Linguistics. 3rd edition. Oxford University Press.
- Labov, William (1966), The Social Stratification of English in New York City (PDF) (2nd ed.), Cambridge: Cambridge University Press, archived from the original (PDF) on 2014-08-24
- Lightner, Theodore M. (1972), Problems in the Theory of Phonology, I: Russian phonology and Turkish phonology, Edmonton: Linguistic Research, inc
- Qafisheh, Hamdi A. (1977). A short reference grammar of Gulf Arabic. in consultation with Ernest N. McCarus. Tucson, Arizona: University of Arizona Press. ISBN 0-8165-0570-5.
- Stieber, Zdzisław (1989). Zarys gramatyki porównawczej języków słowiańskich (in Polish). Warszawa: Państwowe Wydawnictwo Naukowe. ISBN 83-01-00663-3.
