= Matura =

Latin for the secondary school exit exam

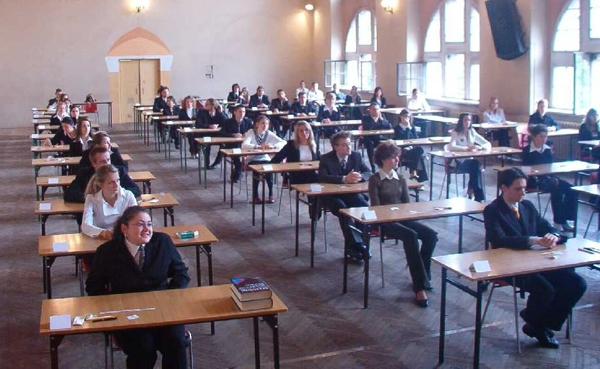
High-school students in Szczecin, Poland, waiting to take a matura exam in 2005

Matura or its translated terms (mature, matur, maturita, maturità, Maturität, maturité, матура, érettségi) is a Latin name for the secondary school exit exam or "maturity diploma" in various European countries, including Albania, Austria, Bosnia and Herzegovina, Bulgaria, Croatia, Czechia, Hungary, Italy, Kosovo, Liechtenstein, Montenegro, North Macedonia, Poland, Serbia, Slovakia, Slovenia, Switzerland and Ukraine.

It is taken by young adults (usually aged from 17 to 20) at the end of their secondary education, and generally must be passed in order to apply to a university or other institutions of higher education. Matura is a matriculation examination and can be compared to A-Level exams, the Abitur, Baccalauréat or the Bagrut certificate.

== By country ==
=== Albania ===
The official name is Matura Shtetërore (State Matura) which was introduced in 2006 by the Ministry of Education and Science replacing the school based Provimet e Pjekurisë (Maturity Examination). The Matura is the obligatory exam after finishing the gjimnaz (secondary school) to have one's education formally recognized and to become eligible to enroll in universities. Vocational schools, art schools and schools participating in pilot programs are part of the Matura with different exam structures and subjects. The Matura is a centralized affair, conducted by the QSHA (Center for Educational Services) which is in charge of selecting tasks, appointing national examiners, grading the sheets; other agencies ensure the safety and integrity of the exams.

The three compulsory subjects to complete secondary education are Albanian language and literature, mathematics and a foreign language (English, except for students in dual-language schools). Students in high schools must also take one additional exam which they choose themselves out of a list of eight subjects. The Matura exams take place in four separate days usually in the June/July period. The first three days are for each of the compulsory subjects; the fourth day is for the additional exam. The basic marks range from 4 to 10 where a 5 is the lowest passing mark; applicants fill out forms indicating their preferred universities with no ranking between them. The State Matura replaced an admission system conducted individually by each faculty/university which was seen as abusive.

=== Austria ===
The official term for Matura in Austria is Reifeprüfung. The document received after the successful completion of the written and oral exams is called Maturazeugnis.

In the Gymnasium (AHS), which, as opposed to vocational schools, focuses on general education, the Matura consists of three to four written exams (referred to as Klausurarbeiten, four to five hours each) to be taken on consecutive mornings (usually in May) and two to three oral exams to be taken on the same half-day about a month later (usually in June); The higher vocational education schools (BHS) such as HBLAs, HTLs, and HTBLAs follow a similar format. All examinations are held at the school which the candidate last attended. Candidates have the option to write a scholarly paper (called Fachbereichsarbeit ) to be submitted at the beginning of the February preceding the final exams, which, if accepted, counts as a subject and must be defended in a corresponding oral exam.

The grading system is the one universally used in Austrian schools: 1 (sehr gut) is excellent; 2 (gut) is good; 3 (befriedigend) is satisfactory; 4 (genügend) is passed and 5 (nicht genügend) means that the candidate has failed. In addition, a candidate's Maturazeugnis contains a formalized overall assessment: "mit ausgezeichnetem Erfolg bestanden" (pass with distinction: an average of 1.5 or better, no grade above 3), "mit gutem Erfolg bestanden" (pass with merit: an average of 2.0 or better, no grade above 3), "bestanden" (pass: no grade above 4); and '"nicht bestanden" (fail: at least one grade 5). Candidates who have failed may re-take their exams in September/October or February/March of the following school year.

Compulsory subjects for the written finals are always German and Mathematics, as well as a foreign language (usually English, French, Spanish, Italian, Latin or sometimes Ancient Greek). Schools with a focus on science may require their students to take written finals in Biology or Physics.

The Austrian Matura used to be a decentralized affair, however since 2014 tests in Mathematics, German and foreign languages are now centralized and held at the same day throughout Austria. There is only one external examiner: candidates are set tasks both for their written and oral finals by their own (former) teachers. Formally, however, there is an examination board consisting of a candidate's teachers/examiners, the headmaster/headmistress and one external Vorsitzende(r) (head), usually a high-ranking school official or the head of another school. Oral exams are held publicly, but attendance by anyone other than a candidate's former schoolmates is not encouraged, and indeed rare.

It is possible for Austrians of all age groups to take the Matura. Adults from their twenties on are usually tutored at private institutions of adult education before taking their final tests, held separately before a regional examination board.

==== The new centralized Matura (Zentralmatura) ====
In 2015, the old Matura system was replaced by a new concept called Zentralmatura (centralized Matura). Graduation exams are now put together by bifie (an institution for research in education) and every graduation exam in Austria is now held on the same day. However, the teachers still correct all the exams themselves using an answer sheet that is included in the exam packages.

Students can still choose either four or three written exams (maths, German and one foreign language are compulsory; one additional language can also be chosen). When students choose three written exams, they will have to do another three oral exams. When choosing four written exams, only two additional oral exams are necessary.

What is also new is that every student now has to write a graduation paper called VWA (Vorwissenschaftliche Arbeit or, literally translated, "Pre-scientific paper"). They can choose any topic they want, usually one year before graduating. When they have finished writing it (it should usually be 30.000 to 60.000 characters long), they have to present it to teachers and to the head (Vorsitzende(r)). The VWA is another grade in the Maturazeugnis.

=== Bulgaria ===
In Bulgarian the matura is formally called държавен зрелостен изпит (Romanization: darzhaven zrelosten izpit, State Maturity Exam) or ДЗИ (DZI), but usually it is called simply матура. There is only one compulsory subject – Bulgarian Language and Literature, but students are required to select an additional subject of their choice; they can also request a third and fourth subject. Each exam consists of a single written test. The second subject must be chosen between:

- A foreign language (English, French, German, Spanish, Italian, Russian)
- Mathematics
- Physics and astronomy
- Biology and health education
- Chemistry and environmental science
- History and civilization
- Geography and economics
- cycle of "Philosophy"
- Information Technology

In 2008, according to the statistics on the web site of the Bulgarian Ministry of Education, 76,013 students have registered for the matura exams. Of them only 1748 students registered for a third, voluntary subject. Only 845 of them passed the third examination successfully. Because of the exam's challenging nature, students who request a third subject have a significant advantage in the university admissions process.

=== Croatia ===
The nationwide leaving written exam State Matura Exam (Croatian: Državna matura) was introduced for gymnasium (and other four-year high school program) students in the 2009/2010 school year, and nationwide primary school written exam National Exam (Croatian: Nacionalni ispiti) was introduced for all Croatian primary school pupils in March 2023. Both examinations are conducted by the National Center for External Evaluation of Education (Nacionalni centar za vanjsko vrednovanje obrazovanja (NCVVO)). For high school students (taking the State Matura Exam), there are two available terms during which candidates can take their exams: the summer term, taking place during June, and the fall/autumn term, typically occurring in the last weeks of August. Many university faculties and other higher-education institutions already have their applications closed by the end of the summer term due to having reached their first-year students enrollment quota for the upcoming academic year. For primary school pupils, the National Exam is conducted during the months of March and April, and attended by 4th year and 8th grade pupils. As of 2026, NCVVO uses the National Exam only for surveys and analytics, and the results of the National Exam have no effect on pupils' enrolments in high schools.

==== Državna matura (State Matura Exam) ====
Državna matura is taken by all 4th grade gymnasium students (and optionally other four-year high school students) at the end for the school year. The compulsory subjects are available at elementary (B) or higher (A) level exams. Certain higher-education institutions require the candidate to take certain or all compulsory subject exams at the A level. On the other hand, there are higher-education programs requiring only the B level exams. In such cases, the candidate taking an exam in a certain subject on the A level is credited more points than a candidate taking the B level exam: 1 point on the A level exam is worth 1.6 points of the B level exam.

The three compulsory subjects are:

- Croatian (or Serbian, Hungarian, Italian or Czech for minorities),
- Mathematics,
- first foreign language (English, German, Italian, Spanish or French). Students can only take the exam in a language if they had taken classes (and therefore passed them) for at least two years of their high school education. Students of classical gymnasiums are therefore also able to choose Latin or Ancient Greek instead of (or in addition to) a modern foreign language.

The State Matura Exam in Croatian language tests communicative language competences, literary theory, literary history and linguistic knowledge, understanding of literary and non-literary texts, and the use of standard Croatian language in writing various types of texts. The Croatian language exam is structured according to three test areas: Reading and Literature, Croatian Language and Writing, which are based on the educational outcomes from the subject curriculum. The Reading and Literature area consists of three subareas (reading a literary text, reading a non-literary text, theory and history of literature), and the Croatian Language and Writing areas consist of two subareas (structure of the Croatian language, application of the structure of the Croatian language; writing a functional text, writing a school essay; respectively). The number and type of tasks are predetermined for each test area and subarea.

The optional subjects are Biology, Chemistry, Computer science, Ethics, Geography, History, Logics, Musical arts, Philosophy, Physics, Politics, Psychology, Religious studies, Sociology, and Visual arts. Optional subjects are available only at a single level. A gymnasium student is considered to have finished their high school education program upon passing only the three compulsory subjects (alongside fulfilling the other prerequisites set by their high school); if a student fails a Matura exam on an optional subject, that subject simply will not be listed on their certificate.

Students receive their exams in sealed opaque silver bags which they personally open typically by piercing the top with a pen and thus breaking the seal. Inside they get the exam booklet, the answer sheet (used for optically scanning students' answers for a faster grading process), a concept booklet, a new opaque silver bag, and a piece of paper with barcode stickers used for candidate identification. Before they start taking the exam, students need to stick the barcodes on every booklet, paper and bag that they received. At the end, students gather all the examination material and seal it in the opaque silver bag they had received, which will then be sent back to NCVVO for grading. The answers of the exam questions are published typically two days after the exam day.

Examinees are allowed to file a complaint on grading, or even on the exam questions. On the 2012 Croatian language exam, a total of 7 exam questions were nullified due to multiple possible interpretations of the source text and the indiscrimination by the examinees shown by the psychometric analysis.

Further enrolment into higher education is conducted online via the Postani student website (English: Become a student), which is a part of the National Computer System for Applications for Higher Education Institutions (Nacionalni informacijski sustav prijava na visoka učilišta (NISpVU)). Each candidate has the right to attempt to enroll at a maximum of 10 colleges, faculties, schools, and academies of universities, or other types of higher-education institutions. Lists of students with the right to enrollment are processed by the central computers of each institution's division. The rank is formed based on Matura exams points and optional additional criteria or extra points set by the institution that ranks the applicants, for example, admission exams, or GPA of final grades of each year in certain or all high school subjects.

For example, for a domestic student to enroll at the School of Medicine, University of Zagreb, the following criteria needs to be met: they have acquired at least 55% on the compulsory admission exam (select advanced areas in Chemistry, Biology and Physics), and they have passed the A level exams of the compulsory Matura subjects. Their final points are then calculated based on the following:

- the compulsory admission exam (60%),
- the A level Matura exams: Croatian (10%), Mathematics (4%), foreign language (10%),
- grade point average in all high school subjects (16%)

==== Nacionalni ispiti (National Exam) ====
As of March 2023, NCVVO annually conducts compulsory exams for 4th grade and 8th grade primary school pupils. They are held in March (for 4th grade pupils) and in April (for 8th grade pupils). The exam assesses knowledge in the following subjects, of whom all are compulsory:

4th grade	8th grade
Croatian
Minority languages (compulsory only for minorities)
Mathemathics
Nature and society / Biology (from 1st to 6th grade, Biology is called "Nature and society")
	First foreign language
Geography
Physics
Chemistry
History

The examination process is near identical to the State Matura Exam. Pupils receive exams sealed in silver opaque bags with exam booklets, answer sheets, identification stickers and silver opaque bags for return.

However, the exam results for all pupils and schools are only informative. They are used to collect data and help improve the educational system, as well as provide feedback to primary schools. They do not have any effect on the enrolment process of pupils in high schools, which remain dependent on points (made up of pupils' primary school grades and extracurricular sport achievements).

The results of the exam are posted in each pupils' CARNet e-Dnevnik account (Croatian school e-Grading system). Pupils only receive the number of points they scored on the National Exam.

=== Czech Republic ===
The official term for matura in the Czech Republic is maturita or maturitní zkouška. In 2010, the Czech Republic introduced a system of state exams, which divided the previous system into two parts. The first is the state exam, which consists of two compulsory subjects: Czech language and literature and either a foreign language (mostly English, but also German, Russian, Spanish or French) or mathematics (the combination is chosen by students). The second part consists of Czech language and literature and at least two, but usually three, "profile" subjects, which vary between schools. Gymnázium (similar to grammar school) students usually choose from:

- Biology
- Chemistry
- Foreign language
- Geography
- History
- Information Technologies
- Mathematics
- Physics
- Social Sciences (usually includes psychology, sociology, economics, law, political science, philosophy and international relations)

The state part of the exam is supervised by CERMAT (formerly Centrum pro reformu maturitní zkoušky, "Centre for Maturita Reform; now Centrum pro zjišťování výsledků vzdělávání, "Centre for Determination of Education Results"), a state managed company. CERMAT issues final tests for the state part of the exam, documentation and practical tests, holds training for teachers who correct essays and supervise the students during the exams. The main part of the company is the tech centre, which is used for auto correcting the students exams. State exams are subject to continual improvement. Today the tests consist of four exams from which two are state organized and two school organized, in the future the state wants to add at least one more state exam and one more compulsory school exam.

In 2012 the state part of the maturita exam was split into two difficulty levels – students could choose between basic and advanced tests. This solution was found to be ineffective and was canceled the following year.

The Czech Republic also has a separate examination system called Národní srovnávací zkoušky ("National Comparative Test"), owned and managed by the private company Scio, s.r.o. which provides tests for all subjects. Some Czech universities recognize the results of these tests and students can be accepted based on these results, however, they still have to succeed in the maturita exam.

The examination itself is also divided between written and oral parts but not all subjects require both written and spoken input (for example math is formed by a written test only). Usually both the written and the oral part of the exam are set in late spring. The state part of the written exam is set to one day in which students in the whole country write identical tests, different tests are always issued on the day the exam takes place. The school (profile) part is always different and is based on requirements of the school which issues the test so it may be both written and spoken, but it can also be only one of the options.

The oral part of the maturita exam takes part in a classroom in which a commissioner must be present. The oral exam is divided into two 15 minute parts (except Czech language and literature, where the preparation time is 20 minutes), first a student draws a number of their question and then begins 15 minutes of preparation often called potítko ("sweat lodge") after the first 15 minutes they are called in to the 15 minute oral exam. The commission is composed of the class teacher, commissioner and either a principal or a representative principal. The student is examined by the examiner and an assessor. The examiner and the assessor usually agree on a grade which should be assigned to the student and if not the commission takes a vote for the grade. Students can graduate with a grade better than 5 (grades are 1–5, where 1 is the best).

Exam duration, for both oral and written exams, as well as preparation time, can be longer for students with disabilities.

If students fail in one subject, they have the option to repeat the subject, if they fail more than one subject, then they have to repeat the complete set of exams including the written part. All students have a maximum of three attempts to succeed in this exam, if they fail to succeed they end secondary school without the maturita and are unable to apply for college or university. They still have a chance to do maturita exam on another secondary school in the future, but this mostly means that they should finish study on that another school in full length, e.g. 4 years.

=== Hungary ===
The official term for the matura exam in Hungary is "érettségi vizsga" or simply "érettségi". It is usually taken after 12 or 13 years of schooling, at the age of 17 to 19, but may also be taken at a later age. The exam of certain subjects like foreign languages and IT can be completed at an earlier age. Candidates who pass their final exams (school-leaving exams) receive a document that contains their grades and which enables them to go to a university.

Hungarian students have to take an exam from Hungarian literature and grammar ("magyar nyelv és irodalom"), Mathematics ("matematika"), History ("történelem"), one foreign language ("idegen nyelv"), and one more subject of the student's choice that can be anything that the student had learned for at least 2 years in school. While these five subjects are mandatory for obtaining a degree, candidates may choose as many additional exam subjects as they wish. Students can choose between standard (közép) or higher (emelt) level for each subject. The exams do not necessarily have to be taken in Hungarian; at the candidate's request, they can be taken in any language (with the exception of Hungarian literature and grammar for obvious reasons).

The Hungarian literature and grammar, History, the Sciences (e.g. biology) and foreign language exams are made up of a written and an oral part, while the standard-level Mathematics exam contains only a written part. (Should a candidate fail their standard-level Mathematics exam, they can have an oral exam in order to pass). The higher-level Mathematics exam consists of both a written and an oral part.

The grading scale of the érettségi is the same as the usual grading used in Hungarian schools but the percentages differ: excellent (5), good (4), medium (3), pass (2), and fail (1).

Grades and percentages
		Standard level	Higher level
Grade	Description	Percentage	Percentage
1	failed	0–24%	0–24%
2	pass	25–39%	25–32%
3	medium	40–59%	33–46%
4	good	60–79%	47–59%
5	excellent	80–100%	60–100%

=== Italy ===
In Italy the examination is called (esame di) maturità ("maturity exam"). This is the final exam for secondary school, which students are normally required to pass in order to be admitted to colleges and universities.

In Italy, the maturità is informally regarded as a rite of passage from adolescence to adulthood, after which secondary school graduates get ready for higher education and/or a job.

Examination boards are composed of three internal teachers belonging to the student's school, three external teachers and an external president of the board. Every year the Ministry of Education decides which subjects will be assigned to external teachers; these are different depending on the type of school.

The exam is divided into written and oral sections. The written section consists of three tests. The first one is Italian and is identical nationwide: students are required to write an essay, an article on a given topic, but they can also choose to analyse and comment on a text (usually a poem). The second test changes according to the type of school the student attended, so it can be on a wide variety of different subjects, such as pedagogy and psychology, mathematics, foreign language, Latin, and Ancient Greek. It is identical nationwide for schools of the same type. The subject is decided by the Ministry a few months before the exam: it is almost always the same for some types of school (for example Mathematics for liceo scientifico) and it is chosen among the "written" subjects for other schools (for example, it is chosen between Latin and Ancient Greek for liceo classico or one of the three different foreign languages studied, included English, in liceo linguistico). Finally, the third test is about a maximum of five selected subjects of the last year, and it is written by every single examining commission. The student does not know before which subjects are in the text. In 2019 the third test was abolished, leaving the first and the second written tests and the oral test. The interview section is to assess that the student has really reached a personal and intellectual maturity concerning the various subjects of his or her last school year; the examining commission is supposed to ask about every subject, but has got to make sure that the candidate is also able to discuss about a variety of themes explaining and justifying his or her opinion; also, in recent years has become customary for each student to prepare a short essay (tesina) on a free topic, intended to showcase the ability to cover different sides of the topic using extensively the notions and methods learnt in school.

The scoring has been changed various times since 1969:

- 1969–1998: pass 36, maximum 60
- 1999–2006: pass 60, maximum 100 (45 + 35 + 20)
- 2007–2008: pass 60, maximum 100 cum laude (40 + 45 + 30)
- 2009–2018: pass 60, maximum 100 cum laude (45 + 30 + 25)
- 2019: pass 60, maximum 100 cum laude (40 + 20 + 20 + 20)

The score is calculated by adding up:

- Credits: up to 25 points from school grades; the top score is assigned to students who have an average above 9 out of 10. Starting the school year 2018–2019 up to 40 points.
- Written exam: the pass mark is of 30 points out of 45. The candidate sits 3 written tests. For each one the passing mark is 10 points out of 15. Starting the school year 2018–2019 up to 40 points. The candidate sits 2 written tests. For each one up to 20 points.
- Oral exam: the passing mark is 20 points out of 30. Starting the school year 2018–2019 up to 20 points.
- Bonus: an extra 5 points can be awarded to the candidate by the examining commission. In order to get this bonus, candidates must have received at least 15 credits and the sum of their oral and written exams must be at least 70.

The students who are able to reach 100 points without needing a bonus can be awarded the lode ("cum laude") praise by the examination board.

=== Kosovo ===
In Kosovo, Testi i Maturës Shtetërore/Državni maturski ispit (the State Mature Exam) is mandatory for every high school student in order to get the high school certificate. Without passing the Matura Exam, one cannot apply to any university within Kosovo. It has different number of questions per subject, depending on the High School's profile.

It is held every year in June, and with the latest reforms, there are two tests, on two different days:

- the First one has 100 questions, and has questions about general subjects;
- the Second one has 100 questions, and has professional subjects questions.

From 2020 to 2022, it has 100 questions (25 per subject) on Albanian, Mathematics, English and another self-chosen subject. This exam change was made due to Covid-19 and the students have higher requirements, since they have to obtain more than 40 points to pass.

The tests are held on the same day for every school, usually in the middle of June. There is also a similar test for the Primary School pupils as well, called Testi i Semi-Maturës Shtetërore/Državni malomaturski ispit (State Semi-Matura Exam) which has 100 questions, and is mandatory for every pupil who will continue to High School. The Semi-Matura Exam has also changed in June 2022. It now has 200 points and it is held in two days, like the Matura Exam before.

- the first exam has 100 points and is based on Social Sciences:(Albanian, History, Geography, English)
- the second exam also has 100 points but it is based on nature sciences: (Mathematics, Informatics, Biology, Chemistry, and Physics)

The Tests are provided by the Ministry of Education, Science and Technology, and are in Albanian, Serbian, Turkish and Bosniak, who make the ethnical groups of Kosovo.

=== North Macedonia ===
In North Macedonia the matura is obligatory for every high school student who is planning on going to college afterwards. It is called државна матура ("state matura") or simply матура ("matura"). Every student who intends to pass the matura is required to complete four exams:

- Native language (either Macedonian, Albanian or Turkish): demonstrating knowledge of literature and grammar of the four-year high school studying, as well as essay writing.
- Mathematics/foreign language: students choose whether they will take mathematics (basic or advanced level) or a foreign language (typically English, German, French or Russian).
- two subjects by student's choice (subjects available, beside the aforementioned ones, Biology, Chemistry, Physics, Geography, Sociology, Informatics, Latin, Art, Music, History, Philosophy, Business etc)
- a project task

In 2025 the Ministry of Education and Science reformed matura to include three different types of it:

- State matura (државна матура) - required for Gymnasium (гимназија) students
- State vocational matura (државна стручна матура) - an option for four-year vocational school students
- State Art matura (државна уметничка матура) - an option for art school students

Since 2026, students in a Vocational High School (средно стручно училиште) cannot take matura with their vocational subjects as they could previously. If they wish to go to a college that is not in their field of study, they must take state matura with subjects from the general education subjects that they have been taught. They have been given the option to take a vocational state matura with their vocational subjects but that limits their choice of college to one in the same field. Students of an art high school are given the option to take a state art matura

=== Poland ===
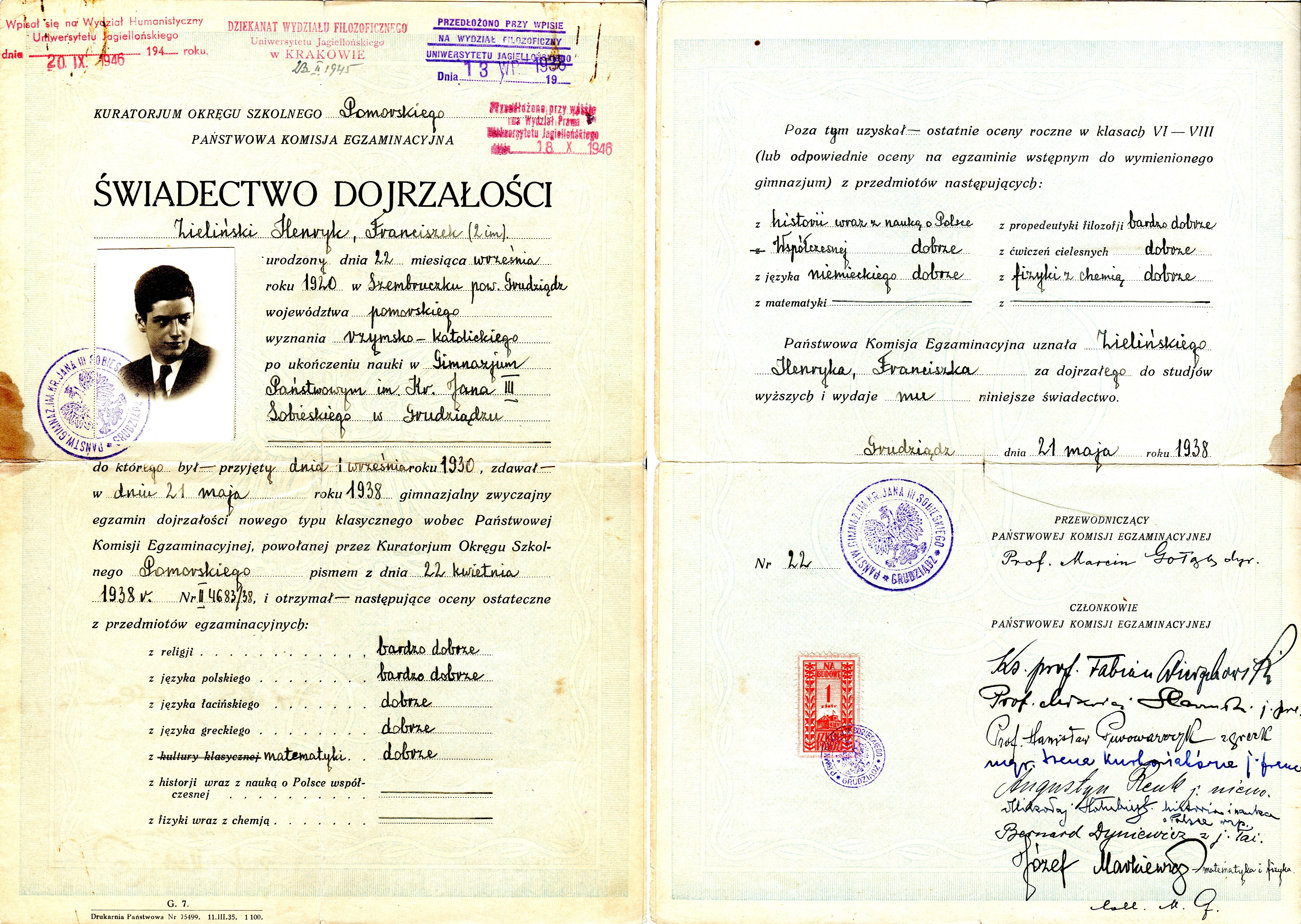
A 1938 matura certificate (titled świadectwo dojrzałości, "certificate of maturity")

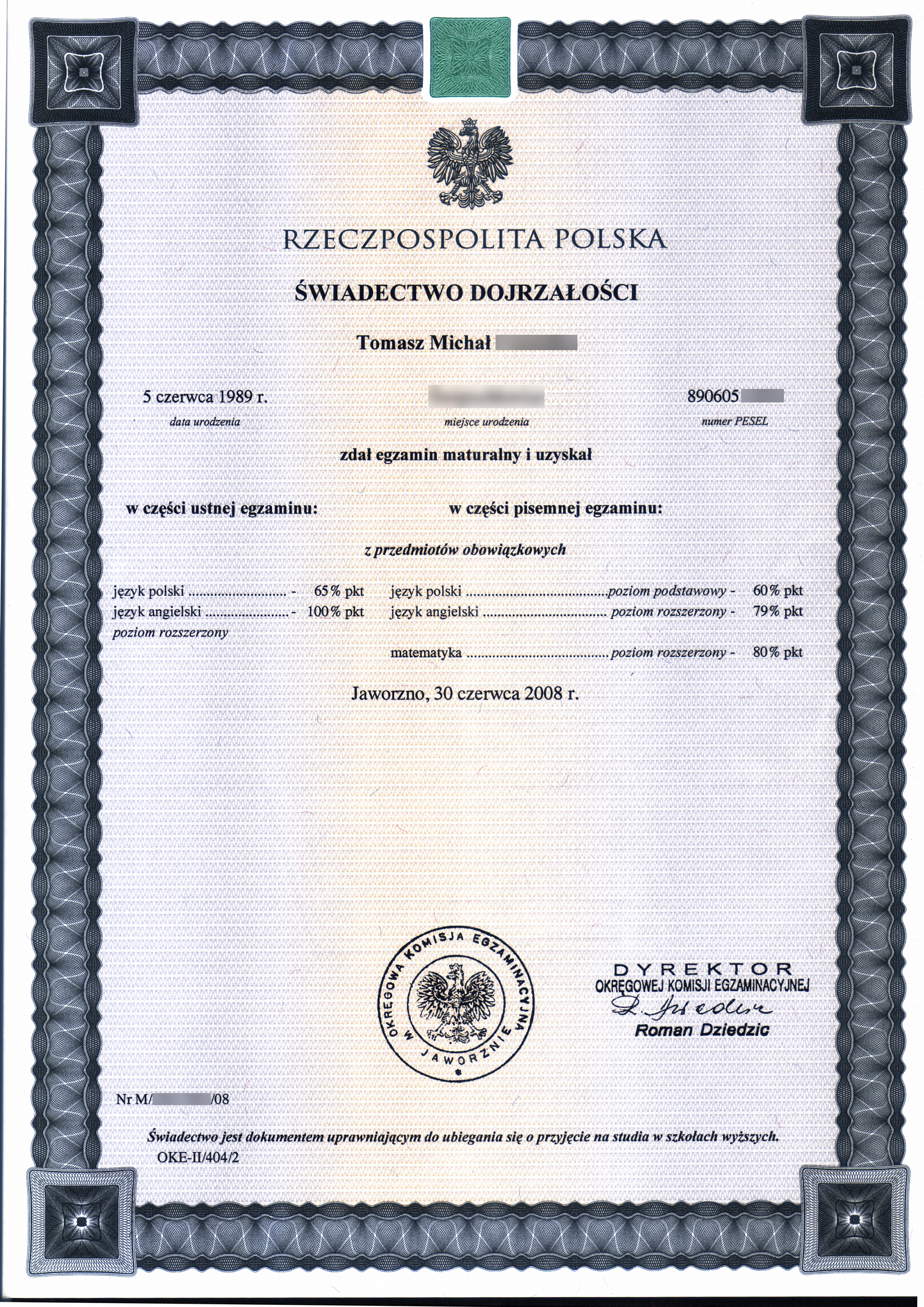
A 2008 matura certificate

In the Polish education system, the exam is officially called egzamin maturalny, but it is commonly known as matura. It is taken on completion of high school, in May (with additional dates in June, and retakes available in August). The exam is not compulsory, although Polish students must pass it in order to be able to apply for higher education courses in Poland and elsewhere.

A major reform of the exam (originally enacted in 1999, although its introduction was delayed) came into effect as from 2005. Under the old system (popularly called stara matura) candidates' performance was assessed solely by teachers from their own schools. In the new system (nowa matura) written work is assessed by independent examiners. This is considered to make the results more objective, and as a result Polish higher education institutions no longer run entrance exams (as they did under the old system), but base their admissions primarily on matura results.

As of 2026, under the current "Formuła 2023" system, all candidates taking the matura are required to pass compulsory examinations in the following subjects:

- Polish (written at the "basic level" (poziom podstawowy), and an oral exam)
- A selected modern language (English, French, German, Italian, Spanish or Russian) (written at the "basic level" (poziom podstawowy), and an oral exam)
- Mathematics (written at the basic level).

Graduates of schools or classes for national or ethnic minorities are additionally required to take both a written and an oral exam in their respective minority language.

Additionally, students must take at least one separate, written exam at the "extended level" (poziom rozszerzony). These include an advanced-level exam in one of the compulsory subjects, or from a list of electives including biology, chemistry, geography, social studies (civics), history, history of art, history of music, information technology (computer science), physics, Latin and Ancient Culture, philosophy. Furthermore, any candidate may choose to take a regional or minority language as an extended-level elective. These include languages of national minorities (Belarusian, Czech, German, Hebrew, Lithuanian, Ukrainian), a regional language (Kashubian), and an ethnic minority language (Lemko).

Starting with the 2027 matura exams, the list of available extended electives expands to include Business and Management (biznes i zarządzanie) and history of dance (historia tańca). Furthermore, Latin will be officially offered as an option for the modern foreign language exam.

Results are currently expressed as percentages. To pass the matura it is necessary to score at least 30% in each of the three compulsory exams. The results of the additional exams do not affect whether a student passes, but are usually a factor when applying for higher education places. Since the year 2015 the results are expressed not only as percentages, but are also accompanied by percentiles on the Matura certificate. This aims to make comparisons between Matura scores from different years fairer.

The exams are conducted by the Central Examination Board (Centralna Komisja Egzaminacyjna; CKE), assisted by a number of Regional Examination Boards (Okręgowa Komisja Egzaminacyjna; OKE). The same bodies also conduct tests for pupils completing primary school.

A custom associated with the matura is the studniówka, a ball organized for students and their teachers approximately one hundred days before the examinations begin. Following a popular superstition, candidates (particularly female ones) wear red underwear at the ball, and then wear the same items for the exam itself, to bring luck.

=== Serbia ===
Matura (Serbian: državna matura) is an obligatory exam at the end of primary school and high school. The exam taken at the end of primary school is called Mala matura (Minor matura) while the one at the end of high school is called Velika matura (Major matura).

For Mala matura there are three exams:

- Serbian language
- Mathematics
- and a special test that has either biology, geography, history, chemistry or physics based on student's choice.

For Velika matura exams depend on the type of school where the student is taking the exam. In gymnasiums these three exams are taken:

- Serbian language
- Mathematics or English language
- And a third exam where students can choose to write a dissertation about a subject from the following courses: physics, chemistry, biology, history, geography, philosophy, psychology, sociology, informatics, musicology or art.

In technical or medical schools these exams are taken:

- Serbian language
- Mathematics
- Depending on the school, a technician-type exam or a medicine-related exam

In Serbian maturas, usually only the dissertation portion of the exam is letter-graded while the rest are point-graded. After passing their exams, students can attempt to enroll at high schools or colleges and other higher-education institutions of their choice. The rankings which determine which students will be accepted to a certain high school are formed based on Matura exam points and GPA of final grades of each year in certain or all subjects. For colleges and other higher-education institutions, admission exams are also taken into account. The mandatory college admission exam accounts for 60% of a student's ranking points while Matura exam points and the grade point average in all high school subjects account for 40%.

=== Slovakia ===
In Slovakia the matura is formally called Maturitná skúška. It consists of one to three distinct parts, depending on the subject. The first section is the External Section and is not required by all subjects. The second section is the Internal Section, it may have one or two subsections, the first one is the written subsection, which is not required by all subjects, and the second one is the verbal subsection, which is required by all subjects. All the sections of matura take place either in the "proper" term, which ranges from March to June, or in an "extraordinary" term, which may be from April to May, or September, or February of the next year.

The first part consists of the External Section. The subjects that include it are: the first foreign language (English, French, German, Russian, Spanish, and Italian), mathematics, Slovak language and literature, Slovak language and Slovak literature, Hungarian language and literature, and Ukrainian language and literature. This section is usually held in March. This section consists of a multiple choice and short answer test. The tests are prepared and electronically assessed by NÚCEM (National Institute for Certified Educational Measurements). The test for the External Section of a given subject has a start time that is the same for the whole of Slovakia and students are supervised by external employees (not employees of the school the test is taking place).

The second part consists of the written subsection of the Internal Section. The subjects which include the written subsection are: Slovak language and literature, Slovak language and Slovak literature, Hungarian language and literature, and Ukrainian language and literature. This subsection consists of one "long answer" question, where a student either receives a theme, or four themes from which they pick one, and then they write an essay in the corresponding language. The length of the essay is based on the proficiency CEFR level of the student. B1 – 160 – 180 words, B2 – 200 – 220 words, C1 – 260 – 320 words, native language (usually Slovak) – 1.5 – 3 A4 pages. The essay themes of a given subject have a start time that is the same for the whole of Slovakia and students are supervised by external employees (not employees of the school the test is taking place). Afterwards essays are evalued by each school according to central criteria.

The third part consists of the verbal subsection of the Internal Section. All subjects include this part. It is usually held in May. Schools create, supervise, and evaluate this part internally. Each subject has its maturita commission, which will create 25 assignments, which each have 3 questions. Afterwards, the school's principal will approve these based on recommendations from the commission's chairman. Students must bring a government issued ID card to prove their identity.

When taking part in matura, students choose or are assigned a proficiency level for their foreign language of choice depending on the school type and student skill. Students of gymnasium schools have to choose at least one foreign language at level B2. Students of linguist-specialized (bilingual) gymnasium schools and students in bilingual classes are assigned the C1 level for the foreign language they are focused on. In the past, if the student had gotten an additional certificate from foreign language (IELTS, TOEFL, CAE, FCE), at least at level B1, they did not need to pass the foreign language exam. However, this was changed in 2014, and now all secondary education students are required to pass the foreign language exam as a part of their matura.

Required subjects for each student depend on the type of school they attend. Usually 4 subjects are required depending on the native language of the student. For gymnasiums, these are: native language (usually Slovak) and literature, a foreign language, and 2 subjects chosen by the student, if the student is a part of an official national minority, in addition to their native language, they are required to choose either Slovak language and literature, or Slovak language and Slovak literature instead of 1 of the 2 choosable subjects. For the first choosable subject, the student must have a cumulative minimum of 6 weekly classes of that subject, or one that falls under the same category (for example, a student may have had 2 classes of math each week for 4 years, this would give them a cumulative total of 8 math classes). Students of bilingual gymnasium schools may have to choose up to 5 additional subjects instead of the regular 2. For schools with a dual education system (stredné odborné školy), these are: native language (usually Slovak) and literature, a foreign language, theoretical part of the subject the school is focused on, and a practical part of the subject the school is focused on, if the student is a part of an official national minority, they are required to choose either Slovak language and literature, or Slovak language and Slovak in addition to the other subjects. Some dual education system schools may offer a "postmatura education", in which case, the student has already completed matura in the past, and therefore, their only subjects for matura are the theoretical part of the subject the school is focused on, and the practical part of the subject the school is focused on. A student may choose to take part in any number of subjects in addition to the ones they are required to choose.

If a student fails, does not show up without an accepted excuse, does "unacceptable behaviour" (cheating or exhibiting improper behaviour) during the external exam, or refuses to answer one of the questions in the vocal part, one of the required subjects, they are able to redo the matura in one of the extraordinary terms (unless unacceptable behaviour), or try again in the next year's term. If a student fails, does not show up, or refuses to answer one of the questions in the vocal part of one of their extra subjects, that subject is not included in their final report, if however, they receive a passing, but unfavourable result from one of their extra subjects, they are not able to exclude it from their final report.

=== Slovenia ===
In Slovenia, the splošna matura (a general, university-oriented leaving exam) is an obligatory examination completed at the end of gimnazija (upper secondary school) in order to have one's education formally recognised and to become eligible to enroll in colleges and universities. It ought not be confused with the poklicna matura (a vocational leaving exam), which is an obligatory examination completed at the end of vocational school programmes and which is not used to demonstrate one's eligibility for university studies. Since there are no entrance examinations for the vast majority of Slovenian university programmes (notable exceptions include art, music and architecture), the score on this exam serves as the main criterion for admission (grades achieved during secondary school also play a small part).

It consists of three compulsory and two elective subjects, although three elective subjects may exceptionally be taken. Among the compulsory subjects, one must be a first or national language (usually Slovene, but, in areas with recognised minorities, alternatively Italian or Hungarian), one Mathematics and one a second or international modern language (selected among English, German, French, Spanish, Italian and Russian). The elective subjects may be chosen among all of the remaining subjects one has encountered over the course of one's secondary school education (including whichever modern languages one has not already chosen, the ancient languages Greek and Latin, physics, chemistry, biology, geography, history, history of art, theory of art, music, philosophy, psychology, sociology, economics, informatics, biotechnology, electrotechnics, mechanics and others, with some limitiations upon which subjects may be taken concurrently if one is taking two electives and none if one is exceptionally taking three).

The leaving exam is a centralized affair, conducted by the National Examination Centre, which is in charge of setting assignments, appointing national examiners, grading examination sheets and disclosing the scores to all of the universities candidates have applied to within Slovenia. Some parts of the internal assessments, namely seminar papers, reports and other works created by students are graded by the student's teachers.

The assessment is somewhat complicated, as there exist different criteria for marking different sets of subjects (largely depending on whether they are taken at an advanced or else standard level, with some subjects only being available at one). In general:

- Among the subjects, the first language is unique and is always graded on an advanced scale from 1 to 8 (with 1 the lowest and 8 the highest score).
- All of the other compulsory subjects, whether taken as compulsory or elective, may be taken at either an advanced or else standard level. If at an advanced level, they are graded on an advanced scale from 1 to 8, while if at a standard level, they are graded on a standard scale from 1 to 5.
- All of the other elective subjects are graded on a standard scale from 1 to 5.

The only score which indicates a failure to pass the examination is 1; all of the other scores are passes of different degrees (with 2 deemed 'satisfactory', and either 8 or else 5 deemed 'excellent' at different scales).

It is, however, possible to pass the examination with a score of 1 in one subject if two conditions are met:

- The candidate has achieved at least 80% of the points required for a score of 2 on a scale from 1 to 5 in the subject, and
- The candidate has received at least a score of 2 in all other subjects, where
  - In at least two subjects, the candidate has been awarded a score of 3 or higher (if the subject passed with a score of 1 is a compulsory subject), or
  - In at least one subject, the candidate has been awarded a score of 3 or higher (if the subject passed with a score of 1 is an elective subject).

Thus, it is possible to gain up to 34 points across five subjects on the examination. If a candidate has taken five subjects, as is usually the case, all of them are accounted for in this final score. However, if a candidate has exceptionally taken six subjects, the sixth subject may be used to determine a final score in place of the lowest-scored among the first five subjects; in this case, all subjects are still accounted for on the candidate's transcript, but one is excluded from the determination of the final score. Students who have achieved 30 or more points are awarded leaving exam diplomas cum laude (or, in Slovene, are recognised as having achieved a zlata matura or 'golden leaving exam') and are usually commended by the president of Slovenia at a festive reception held in September.

The structure of particular examinations is as follows:

- First Language – Slovene (or Hungarian or Italian for members of minorities)
  - Sheet 1: Students write an essay (650 words) on the two pieces of literature. The national committee for Slovene (Državna predmetna komisija za splošno maturo za slovenščino) publishes the titles of the two works the examinees are expected to know one year ahead. This sheet represents 50% of the final score.
  - Sheet 2: Students are given an unknown text from a newspaper, magazine etc., followed by some 30 tasks, testing their ability to read, interpret, and understand the text. Also, students' knowledge of Slovene grammar, word-formation and spelling is tested. The last task is to form a certain type of text, being an invitation, a letter of complaint, biography etc. This sheet represents 30% of the final mark.
  - Oral exam: A candidate is given three questions. The first two are related to the world literature, whereas the third asks about Slovene grammar and history of literature. It is possible to gain 20%.

The final score is expressed in points from 1 (failure) to 8 (the highest standard of knowledge).

- Mathematics

It is possible to take this subject on a higher or basic level.

  - Sheet 1: Students are given approximately ten tasks, evaluating their knowledge of different fields in mathematics. This sheet accounts for 53.3% (on a higher level) or 80% (on a basic level).
  - Sheet 2 (only on a higher level): Students are given three more difficult tasks. This sheet is worth 26.7%.
  - Oral exam: An examinee is given three questions, testing their ability to prove certain theorems or explain some mathematical axioms and definitions.

The final score is expressed in points from 1 (failure) to 5 (the highest mark on a basic level) or 8 (the highest mark on a higher level).

- Foreign languages
- Chemistry
- Information technology, Computer science (separate)
- Physics
- Geography
- History
- Sociology, Philosophy, Psychology

The nationwide leaving exam was reintroduced in Slovenia in 1994, after all upper secondary schools had been suspended in the 1980s and reopened in 1991. The exam is conducted in two terms, the first one being in spring (May/June) and the second one in autumn (September). Due to the university admittance procedure, of which the first call concludes in July, applicants passing the exam in September have usually a very limited choice of university programmes for that year.

There has been a heated debate lately whether this leaving exam should once again be completely abolished. As of January 2007, the position of the Ministry of Education remains that the matura will still be the only way of completing secondary education. The decision on whether universities should introduce entrance examinations and reduce the importance of the leaving exam to a mere pass/fail has not been made yet.

=== Switzerland ===
==== Gymnasiale Matura, Maturité gymnasiale, Maturità liceale ====
In Switzerland's education system, secondary school has several tiers oriented towards different professional tracks. The gymnasium, leading to the Matura graduation, is the highest tier, offering broad and thorough academic foundations to prepare its students for direct entry to university. Approximately 20% of youth attain the Matura every year, although this figure varies among the different cantons, which are in charge of (upper) secondary education. The gymnasial Matura is required and sufficient (except for medicine, where the number of students is restricted) for Swiss students to study at a university or a federal institute of technology irrespective of their subject choice.

The specific requirements for a Matura graduation vary slightly among the cantons. In general they involve two parts: The grades of the last school year and standardized Matura exams at the end of 12th or 13th grade, depending on the canton. Also a scientific Matura paper of about 25 pages has to be executed. Grades attained in classes during the last school year and at the exams, as well as the Matura paper contribute equally to the final grade. With a revision in 2007, among others an appreciation of science subjects were carried out by individual graduation of biology, physics and chemistry, increasing the proportion of teaching mathematics and natural science subjects as well as the introduction of computer science as a supplementary subject.

6 is the best grade, 1 is the lowest. The required average grade to attain Matura is 4. In order to pass, all grades below 4 have to be compensated by better grades in double, and no more than four grades lower than 4 are allowed.

The cantons are responsible for the organisation of the final tests. Exams include a series of oral and written tests. Tests are typically administered by a team consisting of a teacher who was involved in the student's classes and an independent expert. This cantonal Matura exam is recognised in the whole country but there is no single standardised test on a national level in contrary to what exists in France, for instance where the same test with the same questions and the same themes is passed by all students on the same day.

The gymnasial Matura subjects by federal ordinance (MAV/ORM, SR 413.11) are (Art. 9):

The Matura consists of:

1. all 10 or 11 (depends on the canton) basic subjects
2. one major subject
3. one additional subject
4. Matura paper, evaluated by work process, written paper, and oral presentation
- Basic subjects are:
1. a first national language, such as French, German, Italian, or Romansh (only in canton of Grisons); including its related literature
2. a second national language
3. a third language: either a third national language, or English, or a classical language, either Latin or Ancient Greek
4. Mathematics
5. Biology
6. Chemistry
7. Physics
8. History
9. Geography
10. Visual Arts or Music
11. Cantons (such as Lucerne) may voluntarily provide an additional basic subject: Philosophy
- The major subject is selected from:
  - Classic languages (Latin and/or Ancient Greek)
  - A modern language (a third national language, English, Spanish, or Russian)
  - Physics and Applied Mathematics
  - Biology and Chemistry
  - Economics and Law
  - Philosophy, Education, Psychology
  - Visual Arts
  - Music
- The additional subject is selected from (must not be equal to major subject):
  - Physics
  - Chemistry
  - Biology
  - Applied Mathematics
  - Informatics (Computer Science)
  - History
  - Geography
  - Philosophy
  - Religion
  - Economics and Law
  - Education/Psychology
  - Visual Arts (excluded, if major subject is either Visual Arts or Music)
  - Music (excluded, if major subject is either Visual Arts or Music)
  - Sports (excluded, if major subject is either Visual Arts or Music)

The distribution of teaching hours among the subjects must adhere to the following scheme:

- For basic subjects:
  - Languages (first, second, and third): 30–40%
  - Mathematics and Natural Sciences (Physics, Chemistry and Biology): 25–35%
  - Human and Social Sciences (History, Geography, Introduction in Economics and Law, possibly also Philosophy): 10–20%
  - Arts (Visual Arts and/or Music): 5–10%
- For major and additional subjects, and Matura paper: 15–25%

Matura exams are executed on at least five of the following subjects (all written exams and optionally also oral):

1. The first language
2. A second national (or cantonal) Language
3. Mathematics
4. the major subject
5. another subject chosen by cantonal preferences

A Federal Matura exists on a national level, though each Cantonal Matura is also inherently approved on a federal level. The Federal Matura is organised by the State Secretariat for Education, Research and Innovation (SERI) twice a year in each linguistical region.

An additional exam called Latinum Helveticum, also organised by the State Secretariat for Education, Research and Innovation, allows the student to study a field at a university that requires Latin knowledges.

==== Fachmatura / Maturité de culture générale / Maturità specializzata / Maturita media spezialisada ====
The Fachmatura/Maturité de culture générale/Maturità specializzata/Maturita media spezialisada is a relatively new program (success rates were first published in 2008). The exam is taken after completion of a Fachmittelschule and it opens up certain technical college courses. The program requires successful completion of general education subjects as well as one year of additional training in one or two professional fields and writing a matura paper. The following fields may be chosen from; health, social work, science, communication and information, music/dance/theater, art and design and education.

==== Berufsmatura / Maturité professionelle / Maturità professionale ====
The advanced vocational certificate (Berufsmatura/Maturité professionelle/Maturità professionale) allows access to the Fachhochschule or University of Applied Sciences and indicated both successful completion of the vocational program as well as additional advanced studies. It can be earned either during the vocation course or after course completion. Originally there were six specialties in which the certificate could be earned. Following the new vocational regulations of May 2015 there are now five orientations with two variants for each of the first three; "Technology, Architecture and Life Sciences", "Economics and Services", "Health and Welfare", "Art and Design", and "Nature, Agriculture and Food Services".

2015 Matura completion rates per canton and gender
Canton	Gender	Total matura %	Gymnasium matura %	Berufsmatura %	Fachmatura %
Switzerland	Total	37.5%	20.1%	14.7%	2.7%
Switzerland	Female	42.1%	23.7%	14.0%	4.5%
Switzerland	Male	33.1%	16.7%	15.4%	1.0%
Zürich	Total	36.3%	19.7%	15.8%	0.8%
Zürich	Female	39.7%	23.4%	15.0%	1.3%
Zürich	Male	33.1%	16.2%	16.6%	0.4%
Bern	Total	35.4%	17.9%	16.3%	1.2%
Bern	Female	40.2%	22.6%	15.6%	2.1%
Bern	Male	30.7%	13.5%	17.0%	0.3%
Lucerne	Total	31.1%	18.6%	11.0%	1.5%
Lucerne	Female	35.4%	21.7%	11.0%	2.7%
Lucerne	Male	26.9%	15.5%	11.0%	0.4%
Uri	Total	29.7%	14.7%	13.1%	1.9%
Uri	Female	30.1%	12.7%	13.3%	4.1%
Uri	Male	30.0%	17.0%	13.0%	-%
Schwyz	Total	32.9%	17.9%	13.6%	1.5%
Schwyz	Female	36.0%	21.0%	12.2%	2.8%
Schwyz	Male	29.8%	14.8%	14.8%	0.2%
Obwalden	Total	33.8%	18.2%	15.1%	0.4%
Obwalden	Female	40.7%	22.0%	17.8%	0.8%
Obwalden	Male	27.3%	14.4%	12.9%	-%
Nidwalden	Total	31.3%	16.1%	14.3%	0.9%
Nidwalden	Female	35.3%	22.4%	11.1%	1.8%
Nidwalden	Male	28.1%	11.0%	17.1%	-%
Glarus	Total	27.0%	11.7%	13.7%	1.6%
Glarus	Female	31.4%	15.4%	13.3%	2.7%
Glarus	Male	22.8%	8.2%	14.2%	0.4%
Zug	Total	42.2%	21.4%	17.9%	2.9%
Zug	Female	45.9%	23.4%	18.4%	4.2%
Zug	Male	38.8%	19.6%	17.4%	1.8%
Fribourg	Total	45.4%	22.6%	17.2%	5.5%
Fribourg	Female	50.4%	26.9%	14.5%	9.0%
Fribourg	Male	40.4%	18.7%	19.7%	2.1%
Solothurn	Total	30.7%	14.7%	12.3%	3.8%
Solothurn	Female	34.3%	15.7%	12.3%	6.4%
Solothurn	Male	27.2%	13.7%	12.3%	1.3%
Basel-Stadt	Total	48.4%	32.1%	10.6%	5.6%
Basel-Stadt	Female	54.3%	37.2%	9.8%	7.3%
Basel-Stadt	Male	42.4%	27.1%	11.5%	3.9%
Basel-Landschaft	Total	46.3%	23.1%	17.4%	5.8%
Basel-Landschaft	Female	53.0%	27.7%	15.4%	9.8%
Basel-Landschaft	Male	39.8%	18.6%	19.3%	1.9%
Schaffhausen	Total	34.4%	15.4%	16.1%	2.9%
Schaffhausen	Female	40.0%	19.9%	15.5%	4.6%
Schaffhausen	Male	29.0%	11.1%	16.7%	1.1%
Appenzell; Ausserrhoden	Total	32.4%	17.5%	13.4%	1.5%
Appenzell; Ausserrhoden	Female	34.4%	18.4%	13.3%	2.7%
Appenzell; Ausserrhoden	Male	30.8%	16.7%	13.6%	0.5%
Appenzell; Innerrhoden	Total	30.0%	14.4%	14.6%	0.9%
Appenzell; Innerrhoden	Female	34.8%	19.2%	14.7%	0.9%
Appenzell; Innerrhoden	Male	26.0%	10.4%	14.6%	1.0%
St. Gallen	Total	30.5%	14.0%	14.6%	1.8%
St. Gallen	Female	34.0%	16.3%	14.1%	3.6%
St. Gallen	Male	27.2%	11.9%	15.1%	0.2%
Graubünden	Total	37.8%	18.6%	17.0%	2.2%
Graubünden	Female	41.7%	20.9%	16.9%	3.9%
Graubünden	Male	34.1%	16.5%	17.1%	0.6%
Aargau	Total	34.2%	15.8%	15.7%	2.8%
Aargau	Female	38.9%	19.7%	14.4%	4.8%
Aargau	Male	30.0%	12.3%	16.9%	0.8%
Thurgau	Total	29.8%	13.2%	14.7%	1.9%
Thurgau	Female	34.9%	16.9%	14.3%	3.7%
Thurgau	Male	25.1%	9.7%	15.1%	0.3%
Ticino	Total	50.5%	27.5%	20.8%	2.1%
Ticino	Female	55.6%	31.1%	21.2%	3.2%
Ticino	Male	45.6%	24.1%	20.4%	1.1%
Vaud	Total	36.8%	24.2%	9.8%	2.7%
Vaud	Female	41.3%	27.3%	9.4%	4.6%
Vaud	Male	32.4%	21.2%	10.2%	1.0%
Valais	Total	37.1%	16.1%	14.8%	6.2%
Valais	Female	42.8%	18.8%	13.9%	10.1%
Valais	Male	31.4%	13.6%	15.7%	2.1%
Neuchâtel	Total	46.3%	24.4%	19.5%	2.4%
Neuchâtel	Female	52.8%	29.0%	20.2%	3.6%
Neuchâtel	Male	40.2%	20.1%	18.7%	1.4%
Geneva	Total	45.8%	28.9%	10.6%	6.4%
Geneva	Female	50.6%	33.1%	8.6%	8.9%
Geneva	Male	41.2%	24.9%	12.5%	3.9%
Jura	Total	39.3%	22.2%	13.8%	3.3%
Jura	Female	50.9%	29.0%	16.5%	5.4%
Jura	Male	29.8%	16.8%	11.6%	1.4%

=== Ukrainian diaspora ===
Matura is common in Ukrainian secondary education in the Ukrainian diaspora, specifically in the United States and Canada. It is usually run by Saturday Ukrainian Education schools sponsored by the Ukrainian Congress Committee of America, which regulates and writes the various tests. Children of Ukrainian descent are tested on Saturdays during a month-long period toward the end of their junior or senior year of high school on their knowledge of Ukrainian, geography, history, culture, and literature. Often, these tests are approved by local governments' accreditation standards as a second-language school which can, under certain circumstances, be applied to other schools.

== See also ==
- Bologna Process
- High school diploma
