= Monophthongization of diphthongs in Proto-Slavic =

Monophthongization of diphthongs is a Proto-Slavic sound change in which diphthongs turn into vowels. It is one of the key events in the chronology of the Proto-Slavic language. The monophthongization of diphthongs restructured the Proto-Slavic language with a strong influence on its morphophonology.

== The change ==
Proto-Balto-Slavic, the ancestor of Proto-Slavic, possessed three vocalic diphthongs: *ai, *au and *ei. In Proto-Slavic, these were monophthongized as follows, with the subscript indicating whether the vowels trigger the first palatalization or the second.

- *ai > *ě₂, *i₂ - Early Slavic *snaigu > *sněgъ > Ukrainian сніг (snih)
- *au > *u - Early Slavic *saušu > *suxъ > Serbo-Croatian suh
- *ei > *i₁ - Early Slavic *kreivu > *krivъ > Serbo-Croatian kriv

The fourth Proto-Indo-European vocalic diphthong, *eu, had already become *jau in Proto-Balto-Slavic. It then developed into *ju in Proto-Slavic, following the same development as for *au. The unrounding of older long *ū to Slavic *y had already taken place by the time of the monophthongization; the new *u filled the gap left by it. The first palatalization had also taken place, as the new vowels denoted as *ě₂ and *i₂ did not trigger it.

While most cases of older *ai developed into *ě₂, some inflectional endings appear to have developed *i₂ instead. It is unclear what factors are involved in triggering one reflex versus the other.

- The o-stem nominative plural (Old Church Slavonic člověkъ, člověci), reflecting the original Proto-Indo-European pronominal ending *-oy, also seen in Lithuanian -ai.
- The thematic imperative infix (Old Church Slavonic rešti, rekǫ, reci), reflecting the original Proto-Indo-European infix *-oyh₁-.

== Dating ==
George Y. Shevelov dates the monophthongization of diphthongs to the V – VII century CE. Zdzisław Stieber dates the monophthongization of diphthongs to the V or VI century CE.

=== Toponymy data ===
By the time the Slavic migration to the Balkans began, the monophthongization of diphthongs had not yet taken place, as evidenced by the borrowing of the Latin name Poetovio as the Slavic Ptuj.

Subsequent toponyms show the borrowing of the Latin [au] as [ov], which indicates the completion of the process of monophthongization of diphthongs by the time these names were borrowed, for example:

- Latin Lauretum > Serbo-Croatian Lovret
- Latin Lauriana > Serbo-Croatian Lovran
- Latin Tauriana > Serbo-Croatian Tovrljane
- Latin (Lapides) lausiae > Serbo-Croatian Lavsa / Lavca

== Bibliography ==
- George Shevelov, A Prehistory of Slavic, Heidelberg: Carl Winter Universitätsverlag, 1964.
- Zdzisław Stieber, Zarys gramatyki porównawczej języków słowiańskich, Warszawa: Państwowe Wydawnictwo Naukowe, 2005. ISBN 83-01-14542-0
