= Slovene grammar =

Grammar of the Slovene language

The following is an overview of the grammar of the Slovene language.

== Common phonological changes ==
As in most other Slavic languages, changes to consonants and vowels often occur between related forms of words. Most of these can be traced back to changes that occurred in the ancestral Proto-Slavic language. Over time, many of the original changes have been reversed or levelled out.

=== Consonant alternations ===
- The Slavic first palatalization causes alternations in the velar consonants k, g and h. It occurs in the present tense of consonant stem verbs, and when certain suffixes (often beginning with e or i) are attached to words.
- The Slavic second palatalization affects the same consonants, but has different results, and occurs most notably in the imperative form of consonant stem verbs.
- Iotation is the effect that the consonant j has on a preceding consonant. It may merge with the preceding consonant, causing effects similar to the first palatalization, or it may cause other changes. However, not all instances of j have this effect. This change happens in the present forms of certain verbs in -ati.

The following table gives an overview of the above changes:

Normal	b	p	v	m	d	t	s	z	g	k	h
First palatalization	b	p	v	m	d	t	s	z	ž	č	š
Second palatalization	b	p	v	m	d	t	s	z	z	c	s
Iotation	blj	plj	vlj	mlj	j	č	š	ž	ž	č	š

These changes are very similar to those found in the related Serbo-Croatian language, but Serbo-Croatian ć and đ correspond to Slovene č and j.

=== Hard and soft stems ===
Word stems that end in c, č, š, ž or j are called "soft" stems, while the remainder are "hard". When endings begin with -o-, this vowel usually becomes -e- after a soft stem; this is called "preglas" in Slovene. This happens in many noun and adjective declensions, and also in some verbs. For example, the instrumental singular form of korak "step" is korakom, while for stric "uncle" it is stricem.

There are also some instances where the vowel stays as o, such as the accusative singular of feminine nouns. These instances can be traced back to an earlier nasal vowel ǫ in Proto-Slavic, which did not undergo this change.

=== Fill vowel ===
When certain hard-to-pronounce consonant clusters occur word-finally, an additional fill vowel is inserted before the last consonant(s) of the word to break up the cluster. This typically happens where there is no ending, like in the nominative singular, or the genitive dual and plural. The fill vowel is usually a schwa (/ə/, spelled e). For example, the noun igra "game" has the genitive plural form iger, not igr.

If the last consonant is j, then i is used as the fill vowel instead. For example, ladja "boat" has the genitive plural ladij. However, if the stem ends in lj, nj or rj, then the fill vowel is the normal e and is inserted before both consonants. The noun ogenj "fire", for example, loses the fill vowel in the genitive singular form ognja.

There are a few cases where the fill vowel is instead a stressed a. These are irregular and must simply be memorized. An example is ovca "sheep", which is ovac in the genitive plural, not ovec.

== Noun ==
Nouns are marked for case and number. There are 6 cases (nominative, genitive, dative, accusative, locative, and instrumental) and 3 numbers (singular, dual, and plural). Slovenian nouns are divided into 3 genders (masculine, feminine, and neuter). Each gender has different declension patterns, for a total of 10 declension forms.

== Adjective ==
The adjective expresses three main ideas: quality (qualitative adjectives, kakovostni pridevniki), relation (relational adjectives, vrstni pridevniki) and possession (possessive adjectives, svojilni pridevniki).

Adjectives in Slovenian can serve in three syntactic functions: premodifier (levi prilastek), subject complement (povedkovo določilo), and predicate modifier (povedkov prilastek).

- Premodifier: Kakšno pričesko želiš? (What kind of haircut would you like?)

– Želim modno pričesko. (I would like a fashionable haircut.)

- Subject complement: Kakšna je pričeska? (What is the haircut like?)

– Pričeska je modna. (The haircut is fashionable.)

- Predicate modifier: Kakšna se je naredila pričeska? (What kind of haircut has been made?)

– Pričeska je bila narejena lepa. (The haircut has been made beautiful.)

The majority of adjectives are of the first kind. These express any qualities and properties of personal and impersonal nouns. Such adjectives are gradable either in the two- or three-step comparison, depending if they are relative to another, opposite adjective (three-step) or not (two-step or three-step). (lep – grd (beautiful – ugly) vs bolan (ill)).

Relational adjectives express type, class or numerical sequence of a noun. For instance: kemijska in fizikalna sprememba (chemical and physical change), fotografski aparat (photographic device (=camera)).

Possessive pronouns define possession, ownership or belonging. For example: barvin sijaj (the colour's shine), Karmenina torbica (Karmen's handbag), delavska halja (workers' overall).

Some adjectives expressing properties next to masculine nouns imply definiteness ('relation') or indefiniteness ('quality') of nouns.
For an exactly defined noun or a specific type thereof:

- the adjective in nominative singular has the ending -ni or -i
- the question word is Kateri? (Which? (in German Welcher?))

For nouns not exactly defined, being mentioned for the first time or generic:

- the adjective in nominative singular has the ending -en or - (no ending)
- the question word is Kakšen? (What sort of? (in German Was für ein?))

Adjectives ending in -i and all possessive pronouns do not have special indefinite forms. There are two special adjectives which have special definite and indefinite forms for all genders and all cases, namely majhen (small) and velik (big) (the definite forms are mali and veliki respectively):

- Stari učitelj je to dejal. (The old teacher said this.) – the implication here is that there is at least one other teacher who is not old
- Star učitelj je to dejal. (An old teacher said this.)

The adjective matches the subject or the predicate article to which it is ascribed. If it describes two singular nouns or one dual noun, the adjective should be in the dual. If it describes a plural or one singular and one non-singular noun, the adjective should be in the plural. Although gender should match the group, sometimes the gender of the adjacent noun is used with the appropriate grammatical number. For declension patterns of adjectives, see the section on nouns (the fourth declension is always adjectival). Some adjectives, however, are never declined, for example bež (beige), poceni (cheap), roza (pink), super (super), seksi (sexy), and some other loanwords.

- Mesto in vas sta bila proti predlogu občine. (The city and the village were against the suggestion of the municipality.)
- Mesto in vas sta bili proti predlogu občine (the same, but somewhat unusual and seldom heard)
- Ti in tvoji sestri boste precej odšli! (You [masculine since the verb is in masculine] and your two sisters shall leave forthwith.)

Possessive adjectives for masculine and neuter possessed nouns add -ov (or -ev if the possessive noun ends in c, č, ž, š and j ("preglas")) to the possessive noun. Feminine possessed nouns always take -in. Possessive nouns can include proper names, in which case they are written capitalized.

Negative adjectives are formed by prefixing the negative ne-, which is almost always a proper form even though sometimes, a Latin prefix is an alternative.

- lep -> nelep (beautiful, not beautiful (but not ugly (grd))
- reverzibilen -> nereverzibilen (reversible, irreversible)
- moralen -> nemoralen (moral, immoral) (note that 'amoral' in English has a different meaning)
- legitimen -> nelegitimen (legitimate, illegitimate)

=== Comparative ===
The comparative is formed by adding the ending -ši (-ša, -še), -ejši (-ejša, -ejše) or -ji (-ja, -je) to an adjective, or using the word bolj (more) in front of an adjective in case of stressing and also when the adjective in question cannot be formed by adding an ending, such as when dealing with colours, or when the adjective ends in such a sound that it would be difficult to add the appropriate ending:

- lep – lepši (beautiful – more beautiful)
- trd – trši (hard – harder) (-d- falls out)
- zelen – bolj zelen (green – greener)
- zanimiv – zanimivejši (interesting – more interesting)
- transparenten – transparentnejši (transparent – more transparent) (-e- falls out)
- globok – globlji (deep – deeper) (notice the added -l-, -o- and -k- fall out)
- otročji – bolj otročji (childish – more childish)

=== Superlative ===
The superlative is formed by prepending the word naj directly in front of the comparative, whether it comprises one or two words.

- lep – lepši – najlepši
- trd – trši – najtrši
- zelen – bolj zelen – najbolj zelen
- zanimiv – zanimivejši – najzanimivejši (but najbolj zanimiv is more common)
- transparenten – transparentnejši – najtransparentnejši
- globok – globlji – najgloblji
- otročji – bolj otročji – najbolj otročji'

== Verbs ==
In Slovenian, verbs are conjugated for 3 persons and 3 numbers (singular, dual, and plural). There are 4 tenses (present, past, pluperfect, and future), 3 moods (indicative, imperative, and conditional) and 2 voices (active and passive). Verbs also have 4 participles and 2 verbal nouns (infinitive and supine). Not all combinations of the above are possible for every case.

== Gerund ==
A gerund is a noun formed from a verb, designating an action or a state. The standard substantive in Slovenian ends in -anje or -enje:

- usklajevati -> usklajevanje (to harmonize -> harmonizing)
- pisati -> pisanje (to write -> writing)
- goreti -> gorenje (to burn -> burning)
- saditi -> sajenje (to plant (into soil, as in potatoes (krompir), maize (koruza) or flowers (rože)) -> planting)
- sejati -> sejanje (to plant (by throwing seeds into the air, as in most any cereal (žito), such as buckwheat (ajda), wheat (pšenica), rice (riž) (but also 'saditi riž'), millet (proso), etc.) -> planting)

For example:

- Pisanje ni naravno: potrebno se ga je priučiti. (Writing is not natural: it must be learnt.)
- Ob visokih temperaturah gašenje ognja ni enostavno. (At high temperatures, putting out a fire is not trivial.)
- Brenčanje mrčesa me spravlja ob živce! (The buzzing of insects is driving me crazy!)

== Adverb ==
The adverb in Slovene is always the same as the singular neuter form of any given adjective if derived from an adjective.

1. "Dan je bil lep." (The day was nice.) – masculine adjective
2. "Bilo je lepo." (It was nice.) – neuter adjective

—> "Imeli smo se lepo." (literally, "We had ourselves nicely.", the meaning is 'We had a nice time.')

—> "Govorili so lepo." (They spoke nicely.)

Other types of adverb are derived from nouns (doma (at home), jeseni (in autumn)), prepositional constructions (naglas (aloud), pozimi (in winter), potem (then)), verbs (nevede (unknowingly), skrivoma (secretly), mimogrede (by the way)) or numerals (see adverbial numeral).

In essence, there are four main types of adverb: adverbs of time (danes (today), večno (perpetually)), adverbs of place (domov (towards home, homewards)), adverbs of manner (grdo (uglily), povsem (entirely)) and adverbs of cause and reason (nalašč (on purpose)).

Adverbs are, much like adjectives, normally gradable.

- To je storil natančno. (This he did carefully.)
  - Naslednjič pa še natančneje. (The next time, however, more carefully still.)

== Pronouns ==
Pronouns can replace a noun in a sentence; this is, as opposed to, say, an adjective or an adverb.

=== Personal pronouns ===
A personal pronoun denotes the speaker (I), the addressee (you) or a third person (it). Personal pronouns in Slovene are inflected in a somewhat unusual way, for there are many different forms for each of the pronouns.

Several of the pronouns have unstressed and clitic forms that are unstressed, and may attach to another word. For example:

- Zanj mi je dal denar. "He gave me the money for him." (Note: if the 'he' was referring to the same person, the reflexive personal pronoun would be used.)
- Za njega mi je dal denar. "He gave me the money for him (in particular)."
- Sledili smo jim. "We followed them."
- Spodbudili smo jih, da naj se pokažejo vredne našega zaupanja, a so nas nesramno zavrnili. "We encouraged them to prove themselves worthy of our trust, but they rejected us rudely."
- Nanjo se je zgrnila ena nesreča za drugo. "She was struck by one misfortune after another."
- Da bi le njim to lahko dopovedali! "If only we could make them understand this!"
- Zame ni več rešitve: pugubljena sem. "For me there is no solution any more: I am doomed."
- Pogledal ga je s kancem ironije v očeh. "He looked at him with a drop of irony in the eyes."
- Pogledal je njega. "He looked at him (in particular)."

The nominative forms of personal pronouns are not used in neutral sentences, only when emphasizing the subject, especially so for the first person singular jaz "I". This is because unlike in English, the form of the verb gives all applicable information such as the gender, grammatical number and person by itself.

- Jaz mislim drugače. "I (in particular, or contrasting) think otherwise."

The reflexive pronoun begins with s- and is used to refer back to the subject, or to some other word.

For example:

- Umivam si roke. "I am washing my hands."
- Umivate si roke. "You are washing your hands."
- Umivam se. "I am washing myself."
- Umivate se. "You are washing yourselves."

Similarly as in English, the reflexive pronoun can sometimes be replaced by the reciprocal phrase drug drugega "each other, one another". Thus:

- Drug drugemu umivata roke. "The two of them are washing each other's hands."
- Umivata drug drugega. "The two of them are washing each other."

The accusative se can bind with prepositional words just like other personal pronouns:

- Nase je nanesla lepotilno kremo. "She put beautifying cream on herself."
- Ampak ko dela zase, dela učinkovito. "But when he/she works for him-/herself, he/she works efficiently."

Other cases and examples:

- Sebi gradi grobnico. "He/She is building a tomb for him-/herself."
- Gradi si grobnico. "He/She is building a tomb for him-/herself." (The emphasis here is not so much on for whom the tomb is, but rather the tomb or the building itself.)
- S sabo/seboj ni zadovoljna. "She is not happy with herself."
- Najprej počisti pri sebi, potlej šele kritiziraj druge! "First clean up at yourself, only then criticize others!"
- Ko je videl odsev sebe v ogledalu, mu je ta pogled povsem pokvaril dan. "When he saw the reflection of himself in the mirror, this sight completely ruined the day for him." (Not a widely used construction, this would be more usually expressed with the possessive adjective: Ko je videl svoj odsev v ogledalu ...)

=== Interrogative pronouns ===
The interrogative pronouns introduce direct and indirect questions. There are two nominative forms: kdo "who" and kaj "what".

- Kaj je ta stvar, ki se premika? "What is this thing that is moving?"
- Vprašal sem ga, o kom je bil govoril. "I asked him about whom he had been talking."
- Komu naj dam to? "To whom ought I to give this?"
- Česa ne smem storiti? "What may I not do?"

=== Relative pronouns ===
The substantival relative pronoun is derived from the interrogative by adding -r: kdor "who, that", kar "which, that".

- Kdor krade, ni pošten. "Someone who steals is not honest."
- Kar poveš, tega ne moreš več obvladovati. "Something that you say, that you cannot control any more."
- Odrekli so ji možnost do izbire odvetnika, s čimer je bila kršena njena ustavna pravica. "They refused her the option of choosing a solicitor, with which her constitutional right was violated."

=== Negative pronouns ===
The negative pronoun is derived from the interrogative as well, and starts with ni-: nihče "nobody, anybody", nič "nothing, anything".

A negative pronoun demands a negative predicate, resulting in the so-called double negation:

- Nihče me nikoli ni maral. "Nobody ever liked me."
- Nikjer ni nikogar. "There is no one anywhere."
- Nič ni resnično. "Nothing is real."
- Od nikogar ne želim ničesar. "I want nothing from no one." or more freely "I don't want anything from anyone."
- Nikogaršnja neolikanost ni nikdar in nikjer in na nikakršen način nikomur pridobila nič drugega kot neodobravanje. "No one's impropriety gained ever anyone anywhere and in whatever way anything else than disapproval."

=== Universal pronouns ===
The universal pronouns are vsakdo "everyone" and vse "everything, all".

- Vsemu so namenjali pozornost. "They dedicated attention to everything."
- Vsakogar bodo vrgli iz službe, če ne bo izpolnjeval zahtev. "They will sack everyone who will not fulfil requirements."

Vsak "each, every" is an adjective that can function as a pronoun. Also in this category are vsakateri and vsakteri, both meaning "everyone", which are old-fashioned and not used in modern language.

=== Indefinite pronouns ===
The indefinite pronoun is derived from the interrogative, and starts with ne-: nekdo "someone, anyone", nekaj "something, anything". It refers to an unknown or deliberately untold person or object. The inflection follows the pattern of kdo and kaj.

- Nekoga so videli stati ob oknu, a niso mogli ugotoviti, kdo bi to lahko bil. "They saw someone standing near the window, but they could not figure out who could have been that."
- Zgodilo se je nekaj strašnega! "Something horrible has happened!"
- Zataknilo se jima je pri nečem, a nikakor se ne morem spomniti, pri čem. "They faltered at something, but I cannot in any way remember at what."
- Nekdo prihaja. Skrijmo se. "Someone is coming. Let us hide."

The interrogatives kdo and kaj, can also refer to any unspecified person or object, or one that can be chosen at will.

- Sporoči mi, prosim, če se bo kaj spremenilo. "Please let me know if anything changes."
- Seveda dvomim o čem: kaj to ni normalno? "Naturally I doubt about something: is this not normal?"
- Česa podobnega še nisem videl! "I have never seen anything like that!"
- Uporabi klorovodikovo kislino ali kaj drugega, da nevtraliziraš to bazo. "Use hydrochloric acid or something else to neutralize this base."
- Denar, ki si ga kdo sposodi, seveda ni njegov, pač pa z njim le upravlja. "Money that someone borrows is obviously not his; he merely manages it."
- Naj stopi kdo vendar do tega DJ-ja in ga nekajkrat lopne po glavi. "May someone go to this DJ and smack him on the head a few times."
- Ojej, kakšne lepe govorice! O tem se res moram s kom pogovoriti. "Oh dear, what beautiful gossip! I really must talk to someone about this."

=== Relative indefinite pronouns ===
The relative indefinite pronouns are kdorkoli or kdor koli (whoever) and karkoli or kar koli (whatever). The meaning conveyed is very similar to the unspecified pronoun. The inflexion follows the pattern of the relative pronoun with -koli or koli appended. The space, as shown, is optional, but for sake of consistency, once one method has been adopted, one should not use the other.

- Kdorkoli pokliče 112, mora znati povedati, kaj je narobe. "Whoever rings 112 must know how to say what is wrong."
- Kogarkoli poslušam od teh politikov, vsi govorijo iste neumnosti. "To whichever of these politicians I listen, they all speak the same stupidities."
- Karkoli stori, stori to dobro. "Whatever he/she does, he/she does it well."

=== Manifold pronouns ===
The manifold pronouns are marsikdo "many (people)" and marsikaj "many (things)". The inflexion follows the basic pattern of kdo and kaj. Although these pronouns refer to multiple people or things, they are grammatically singular. In addition to marsi-, other prefixes are possible, such as redko- (redkokdo "rarely anyone"), mnogo- (mnogokdo, same as marsikdo, although perhaps somewhat less usual) and malo- (malokdo "few (people)").

- Marsikdo pravi, da je lepše živeti na deželi, a jaz jim seveda ne verjamem. "Many people say that it is nicer to live in the countryside, but I of course do not believe them."
- Res je, da marsičesa ne vem, pa vendar veš ti še mnogo manj. "It is true that I do not know many things, but you know far less still."
- Z marsičim je že bila obdarjena, a česa takšnega, kar ji je prinesel egiptovski odposlanec, ni bila nikdar poprej še videla. "Many things she had been gifted, but something like that which the Egyptian emissary brought she had never before seen."
- Redkokdo bi priznal, da je storil takšno napako. "Rarely anyone would admit that he has made such a mistake."
- Mnogokaj mi je šlo po glavi, a bolje je, da ne povem, kaj. "Many things went through my mind, but it is better that I do not say which."
- Maločesa se loti, če ve, da se popolnosti pri stvari ne da doseči. "He attempts to do few things if he knows that perfection cannot be achieved at them."

== Determiners ==
=== Possessive determiners ===
These all inflect as regular adjectives.

	Singular	Dual	Plural
1st person	mój "my"	nájin "our"	nàš "our"
2nd person	tvój "your"	vájin "your"	vàš "your"
Reflexive	svój "one's (own)"		
3rd person masculine	njegôv, njegòv "his"	njún "their"	njíhov "their"
3rd person feminine	njén "her"	njún "their"	njíhov "their"
3rd person neuter	njegôv, njegòv "its"	njún "their"	njíhov "their"

Example sentences:

- Moj bog pravi drugače! "My god says otherwise!"
- Njegove oči so kot kupi koruze na polju. "His eyes are like heaps of maize on a field."
- Letalo je bilo last vojske in njene države. "The aeroplane was the property of the military and her (the military's or another person's, depending on the context) country.
- Vaše kraljevo veličanstvo, klanjam se pred Vami. "Your royal highness, I bow before You."
- Cerkev je njen grob na pokopališču prodala, kajti njeni potomci niso imeli dovolj denarja, da bi plačali pristojbino. "The church has sold her grave at the graveyard, since her descendants did not have enough money to pay the fee."
- S tvojim avtom smo šli: saj ne zameriš, kajne? "We went with your car: you do not resent (us), do you?"

The reflexive determiner svoj is used much as the reflexive pronoun is used, to point back to the subject or another word.

- Stopam v svojo sobo. "I am walking into my room."
- Kupili so jim lepo darilo; vso svojo domiselnost so vložili v njegovo izbiranje. "They bought them a beautiful gift; all their ingenuity they have invested into its choosing."
- Svojega leva je pustila na dežju. "She left her lion in the rain."

The reflexive possessive and 'normal' possessive pronouns make some ambiguous English sentences perfectly clear in Slovene. The sentence "She has taken her towel into the bathroom" can be translated into the following two ways:

- Njeno brisačo je vzela v kopalnico. (the towel she has taken belongs to another person)
- Svojo brisačo je vzela v kopalnico. (the towel she has taken is her own)

=== Other determiners ===
	Qualitative (Kakovostni)	Relational (Vrstni)	Possessive (Svojilni)	Quantitative (Količinski)
Interrogative (Vprašalni)	kakšen, kolikšen (what kind of, to what extent)	kateri (which, what)	čigav (whose)	koliko (how much, how many)
Relative (Oziralni)	kakršen (the kind that)	kateri, ki (which, that)	čigar, katerega (whose)	kolikor (as much)
Negative (Nikalni)	nikakršen (of no kind)	noben, nobeden (no one)	nikogar, ničesar (of no one, of nothing)	nič, noben (nothing, none)
Total (Celostni)	vsakršen (of every kind)	vsak (everyone)	vsakogar, vsega (of everyone, of everything)	ves, oba (all, both)
Indefinite (Nedoločni)	nekak(šen) (some kind of)	neki (some(one))	nekoga, nečesa (someone's, something's)	nekoliko (somewhat)
Unspecified (Poljubnostni)	kak(šen)	kateri	čigav	koliko
Relative Unspecified (Oziralni poljubnostni)	kakršenkoli (whatever kind)	katerikoli (whichever)	čigarkoli (whosever)	kolikorkoli (however much)
Mnogostni (Manifold)	marsikak(šen) (of many kinds)	marsikateri	marsičigav	dokaj, precej (quite a bit, quite a lot)
Differential (Drugostni)	drugačen (different)	drug (someone else)	drugega (of someone else)	ne toliko (not that/as much)
Equal (Istostni)	enak (of the same kind)	isti (the same)	istega (of the same one)	enako (the same [amount])
Demonstrative (Kazalni)	tak(šen) (of this kind)	ta, tisti, oni (that one)	tega (of that one)	toliko (this much)

Quantitative adverbial pronouns are non-inflected at all times. All other pronouns are normally inflected.

Examples:

- Čeprav mi je tisti avtobus bolj všeč, moram na tega, kajti tisti drugi vozi v drugo smer. "Even though I like that bus more, I have to board this one, for that other one is driving in another direction."
- Mnogokakšna želja se mi je že uresničila, vendar mi je marsikatera prinesla tudi kakšne stranske neprijetnosti. "Many a wish has come true for me, however many (a wish) has brought me some side inconveniences."
- Vlak, ki smo ga videli, je pravzaprav tisti, na katerega bi se bili morali usesti. "The train that we have seen is actually the one onto which we should have boarded." (literally: sat on)
- čigav svinčnik je to? "Whose pencil is this?"
- Nekakšna radirka je bila nameščena na drugem koncu. "Some type of rubber was mounted on the other end."
- Enak kalkulator imam kot ti. "I have the same type of calculator as you."
- Vzemi mnenje, katerega ne odobravaš, in ga poskusi spremeniti. "Take an opinion that you do not approve of and try to change it."
- Nekoliko pozni ste, a nič ne de. "You are somewhat late, but that is all right."
- Zaradi nekega bedaka mi je vsako letalo ušlo. "Because of some fool, every aeroplane got away from me. (I missed every plane because of some fool; in the sense that this person has taught me to get to an airport too late or similar, not that all planes have left without me.)
- Toliko truda za nič učinka. "So much effort to no avail."

== Interjection ==
An interjection is ordinarily an uninflected word expressing mental states, encouragement towards actions, greetings or mocking of sounds and voices.

- Uf, končno smo na vrhu. (Phew, we're finally at the top.)
- Uf, povsem mi je ušlo iz spomina. (Gosh, that has slipped my mind completely.)
- Petelin zapoje kikiriki. (A cock sings cock-a-doodle-doo.)
- Mojbog, kaj še vedno klamfaš neumnosti? (My god, are you still talking nonsense?)
- Čira čara, in zajec bo izginil. (Hocus-pocus, and the rabbit will disappear.)
- Torej, kaj porečeš na to? (So, what do you say to this?)
- Brr, kako mraz je. (Brr, it's so cold.)
- Oj (or Hej), ti človek tam zadaj: kako ti je ime? (Hey, you person back there: What's your name?)
- O ne, tako pa se ne govori z menoj. (Oh no, this is not how one speaks to me.)
- No, pa adijo! (Well, then goodbye!)
- Ne bev ne mev niso rekli. (They didn't say anything.)
- Šššš: bo že bolje. (Shhh, it will get better.)

Interjections may be inflected; however, in spite of the words' being the same, such use calls for a different word class (part of speech), this most frequently being nouns.

- "Ufov in ojojev se izogibajte, kajti bolnik je zelo ubog revež s to obrazno hibo." (Steer clear of 'uf's and 'ojoj's, because the patient suffers a lot with this facial deformity.)

== Syntax ==
=== Case use ===
The nominative case defines a subject of a sentence; all other cases define an object as either direct or indirect.

Case	Slovene (semi)	English
Nominative	Moj stol je v sobi	My chair is in the room
Genitive	Mojega stola ni v sobi	My chair is not in the room
Genitive	Košček papirja mi je ostal v dlani	A piece of paper remained in my palm
Genitive	Tipkovnica računalnika je vhodna enota	A computer’s keyboard is an input device
Dative	Beraču je dal denar	He gave money to a beggar
Accusative	Vidim zvezde	I see the stars
Locative	Mnogo je rečenega o novem sodniku	A lot is being said about the new judge
Instrumental	Na sprehod grem s svojim psom	I am going for a walk with my dog

=== Use of number ===
There are four types of inflexion related to the grammatical number in Slovene. The future tense is here used to demonstrate its usage. The future tense is formed with the verb to be in the future tense plus the l-participle of the full lexical verb. For example, a table of the English expression "I will see" ("Jaz bom videl") with gender for he ("on") and she ("ona") without it ("ono") can be written as:

Singular	Dual (semi)	Plural
I will see	We (both/two) will see	We (all) will see
You will see	You (both/two) will see	You (all) will see
He/She will see	They (both/two) will see	They (all) will see

can be translated into Slovene as:

Singular with M/F gender	Dual with M/F gender	Plural with M/F gender
Jaz bom videl/Jaz bom videla	Midva bova videla/Midve bova videli	Mi bomo videli/Me bomo videle
Ti boš videl/Ti boš videla	Vidva bosta videla/Vidve bosta videli	Vi boste videli/Ve boste videle
On bo videl/Ona bo videla	Ona (or onadva) bosta videla/Oni (or onidve) bosta videli	Oni bodo videli/One bodo videle

Slovene has singular and plural but also has the rare dual grammatical number, a separate form of every noun used when there are only two such items (except for natural pairs, such as trousers, eyes, for which the plural is used). Dual grammatical number, when an ambiguity between dual and plural forms exists, can be rendered into other languages in various ways; comparatively often, there is no ambiguity, and the dual is extraneous. (This explains the relatively early disappearance of the dual in most languages). Dual grammatical number was a feature of the Proto-Slavic language which has been retained by Slovene. An example of dual grammatical number would be "onadva sta" ("The two are"), which refers to two objects or subjects in the masculine gender or "onidve sta" ("The two are"), which refers to the same concept but in the feminine gender. However "oni so" ("They are ") refers to more than two objects or subjects in the masculine gender while "one so" ("They are") does the same the feminine gender. Dual grammatical number is also preserved in gender. The dual is used consistently in Slovene.

Bil je lep jesenski dan. Odšla sva v park. Usedla sva se na klopco in se pogovarjala. Lepo nama je bilo.

It was a nice autumn day. We (the two of us) went to the park. We (the two of us still) sat down on a bench and talked. We had a nice time.

Bil je lep jesenski dan. Odšli smo v park. Usedli smo se na klopco in se pogovarjali. Lepo nam je bilo.

It was a nice autumn day. We went to the park. We sat down on a bench and talked. We had a nice time.

The first phrase sounds much more romantic and intimate to a Slovene, a style that is impossible to translate into English, which lacks the dual grammatical number.

=== Sentence ===
==== Constituents ====
In a sentence, there can be only four types of constituent, the order of which is seldom crucial:

subject (osebek) + predicate (povedek) + object (predmet) + adverbial phrase (prislovno določilo).

By changing the order, the stressed part changes. It may also serve to create poetic sentiment, common in poetry.

==== Free sentence ====
Včeraj sem šel domov. (I went home yesterday.) (or: Yesterday I went home.)
Danes prihajam domov. (I am coming home today.)
Jutri bom šel od doma. (I'll leave home tomorrow.)

==== Compound sentence ====
Res me veseli, da si prišel. (I am really glad you came.)
Da – tako je bilo, kakor praviš! (Yes – it was as you say!)

==== Incomplete sentence ====
This is a sentence with no predicate.

Rana ura, zlata ura. (Early to bed and early to rise makes a man healthy, wealthy and wise; The early bird catches the worm (literally Early hour, golden hour))

==== Inserted sentence ====
V tistih časih – bil sem še mlad in sem od sveta veliko pričakoval – sem lepega večera srečal starega berača in ... (In those times – I was still young and I expected a lot from the world – I met an old beggar one fair evening and ...)

==== Accompanying sentence and direct speech ====
"Dobro jutro," je rekla Lojza. ("Good morning," said Aloysine.)
Lojza je rekla: "Dobro jutro." (Aloysine said, "Good morning.")
– Dobro jutro. ("Good morning.")

See also the section on inverted commas.

== Punctuation ==
Punctuation marks are one or two part graphical marks used in writing, denoting tonal progress, pauses, sentence type (syntactic use), abbreviations, et cetera.

Marks used in Slovene include full stops (.), question marks (?), exclamation marks (!), commas (,), semicolons (;), colons (:), dashes (–), hyphens (-), ellipses (...), different types of inverted commas and quotation marks ("", '', ‚‘, „“, »«), brackets ((), [], {}) (which are in syntactical use), as well as apostrophes (',’), solidi (/), equal signs (=), and so forth.
