= Monophthongization =

Vowel sound change

Monophthongization is a sound change by which a diphthong becomes a monophthong, a type of vowel shift. It is also known as ungliding, as diphthongs are also known as gliding vowels. In languages that have undergone monophthongization, digraphs that formerly represented diphthongs now represent monophthongs. The opposite of monophthongization is vowel breaking.

== Arabic ==
Classical Arabic had two diphthongs, /aj/ and /aw/, which are realised as the long vowels /eː/ and /oː/ in numerous Arabic dialects. This monophthongization has further developed into /iː/ and /uː/, respectively, in urban North African dialects.

Some notable exceptions to this monophthongization are some rural Lebanese dialects, which preserve the original pronunciations of some of the diphthongs. Other urban Lebanese dialects, such as in Beirut, use the mid vowels /eː/ and /oː/. Another exception is the Sfax dialect of Tunisian Arabic, which is known mostly for keeping the Classical Arabic diphthongs /aj/ and /aw/. Some varieties might maintain the diphthong for words recently borrowed from Standard Arabic or use them in free variation.

== English ==
Some English sounds that may be perceived by native speakers as single vowels are in fact diphthongs; an example is the vowel sound in pay, pronounced /ˈpeɪ/. However, in some dialects (e.g. Scottish English) /eɪ/ is a monophthong [eː].

Some dialects of English make monophthongs from former diphthongs. For instance, Southern American English tends to realize the diphthong /aɪ/ as in eye as a long monophthong [äː], a feature known as /aj/ ungliding or /ay/ ungliding. Monophthongization is also one of the most widely used and distinguishing features of African American Vernacular English.

=== Smoothing ===
Smoothing is a monophthongization of a closing diphthong (most commonly /eɪ, aɪ, ɔɪ, əʊ, aʊ/) before a vowel that can occur in Received Pronunciation and other accents of English. (Some have called this "levelling", but this is rarely used because it may be confused with dialect levelling.) For example, chaos, pronounced [ˈkeɪɒs] without smoothing, becomes [ˈkeːɒs] with smoothing. Smoothing applies particularly readily to /aɪ/ and /aʊ/ when preceding /ə/, hence [faːə] for fire and [taːə] for tower, or with the syllabicity loss of /ə/, [faə̯, taə̯]. The centring diphthong [aə̯] deriving from smoothing and syllabicity loss may further undergo monophthongization, realizing fire and tower as [faː, taː] or [fɑː, tɑː], similar or identical to far, tar; unlike smoothing, this type of monophthongization (which Wells terms "monophthonging") does not require a following vowel.

Smoothing can occur across word boundaries in the same conditions (closing diphthong + vowel), as in [weː aʊt] way out, [ðeː iːt] they eat, [ɡəː ɒf] go off.

== Indo-Aryan languages ==
Vedic Sanskrit diphthongs /ɐɪ/ and /ɐʊ/ later monophthongize to /eː/ and /oː/ respectively in Classical Sanskrit, but these may remain as diphthongs under sandhi rules.

In Hindustani, the pure vowels /ɛː/ and /ɔː/ are written with the letters for the diphthongs ai and au in Devanagari and related alphabets. The vowel sequences /aːɪ/ and /aːʊ/ exist in Hindi, but are written as āi and āu, with long initial vowels.

== German ==
The so-called early frühneuhochdeutsche Monophthongierung (monophthongization in the earliest stages of New High German) is particularly important in today's Standard German. It changed the diphthongs ie [iə], uo [uə] and üe [yə] to respectively ie [iː], u [uː] and ü [yː]:

Before 11th century > nowadays:

- liebe [iə] > liebe [iː]
- guote [uə] > gute [uː]
- brüeder [yə] > Brüder [yː]

The digraph "ie" has kept its spelling despite monophthongization.

The New High German monophthongization started in the 11th century in the center of the German-speaking area. Bavarian and Alemannic dialects in the south did not undergo the monophthongization changes and thus these dialects remain in an older language state.

== Greek ==
Greek underwent monophthongization at many points during its history. For instance, the diphthongs /ei ou/ monophthongized to /eː oː/ around the 5th century BC, and the diphthong /ai/ monophthongized to /eː/ in the Koine Greek period. For more information, see Ancient Greek phonology § Monophthongization and Koine Greek phonology.

== French ==
French underwent monophthongization and so the digraph ⟨ai⟩, which formerly represented a diphthong, represents the sound /ɛ/ or /e/ in Modern French. Similarly, the digraph ⟨au⟩ and trigraph ⟨eau⟩ represent the monophthong /o/ due to the same process.

== Korean ==
Korean underwent monophthongization two times─18th century, and 20th century. Their common point is that all of the monophthongized vowels were falling diphthongs. In 18th century, /ɐj/ /əj/ monophthongized to /ɛ/ /e/. Similarly, in 20th century /oj/ /uj/ monophthongized to /ø/ /y/ before turning back into diphthongs /we/ /ɥi/ for the majority of speakers.

== Wu Chinese ==
Wu Chinese underwent monophthongization and most diphthongs in Middle Chinese monophthongized: Xie She /ai/ monophthongized to /ɛ/ or /a/ or /e/, Xiao She /au/ monophthongized to /ɔ/, Liu She /əu/ monophthongized to /ɤ/ or /ø/. Consequently, Wu Chinese has many more vowels than other contemporary Sinitic languages. The Jinhui dialect has 20 oral vowel qualities - plus many nasal and rhotic ones - the largest oral vowel quality inventory in the world phonemically speaking.

== See also ==
- Idea-smoothing
- Fusion (phonetics)
- Synaeresis
- Vowel breaking
- Monophthongization of diphthongs in Proto-Slavic
