= Slavic first palatalization =

Sound change in Proto-Slavic

The Slavic first palatalization is a Proto-Slavic sound change that manifested as regressive palatalization of inherited Balto-Slavic velar consonants.

== Motivation ==
An important tendency in Proto-Slavic—one which also operated throughout the Common Slavic period (ca. 300–1000 CE) and was the direct cause of the first palatalization—was so-called intrasyllabic synharmony.

Such intrasyllabic synharmony is said to be violated if a velar consonant occurs before a front (palatal) vowel, as the former is articulated in the region of the soft palate (or velum) near the back of the mouth and the latter in a region closer to the front of the mouth. Historically, speakers have resolved this opposition by assimilating the place of articulation of the velar consonant to that of the front vowel, thereby palatalizing it. This phenomenon is very common in the phonetic history of languages and marks the evolution of almost all modern Romance languages, as just one example.

== Formulation ==
Inherited velars *k (< PIE *k, *kʷ) and *g (< PIE *g, *gʰ, *gʷ, *gʷʰ) change before Proto-Slavic front vowels *e/ē, *i/ī (PIE *e/ē, *i, *ey/ēy, *ew/ēw > OCS e/ě, ь, i, u), and also before the palatal semivowel *j:

*k > *kʲ > *č
*g > *gʲ > *dž > *ž

The Proto-Slavic velar fricative *x, which was absent in PIE and arose primarily from PIE *s by means of the ruki law or from word-initial PIE #sk- (as well as from Germanic and Iranian borrowings), changed in the same environment as:

*x > *xʲ > *š

=== Native word palatalization examples ===
- PIE *wĺ̥kʷe 'wolf' (vocative singular of *wĺ̥kʷos) > PSl. *wilke > OCS vlьče, Pol. wilcze, SCr. vȗče
- PIE *gʷeneh₂ 'woman' > PBSl *génāˀ > PSl. *ženā > OCS žena, Russ. žená, Pol. żona
- PIE *múh₂s 'mouse' > PSl. *mūsi > *mūxi > mūši > OCS myšь, Russ. myš', Pol. mysz

=== Germanic loanword palatalization ===
The effect of the first palatalization is also evident in Germanic loanwords. Compare:

- Germanic *helmaz 'helmet' > PSl. *xelmu > *šelmu > OCS šlěmъ, Russ. šljem, SCr. šljȅm, Ukr. šolóm. In this example, the first palatalization occurs in concert with liquid metathesis, another Slavic sound change phenomenon.
- Germanic *kinda 'child, infant' > PSl. *kinda > *činda > OCS čędo, Russ čado, Old Pol. czędo

== Interpretation ==
Even though it is commonly stated in the literature that the result of first palatalization were consonants */č/, */ž/, */š/, there is no certain evidence that that process was indeed finished by 600 CE.

There is also some disagreement on whether Proto-Slavic velars became affricates before front vowels and before */j/; at first sight, it seems likely that palatalization of velars was an older process than palatalization before */j/.

Many linguists think that the transition *kj > *č, *gj > *ž, *xj > *š occurred simultaneously with the changes *sj > *š, *zj > *ž, i.e. together with changes otherwise known as the Common Slavic iotation (or yodization). However, that change is in fact Common Slavic (post-Proto-Slavic), which is obvious e.g. from the adaption of Romance toponyms in the Adriatic, to which Slavs subsequently spread well after the 5th century, when first regressive palatalization is usually dated. Compare:

- Latin Arsia > SCr. Rȁša
- Latin Sanctus Cassiānus > SCr. Sùkošan

On the other hand, from a purely phonetic viewpoint, it is very hard to believe that velars might have been unpalatalized before *j by the time they palatalized before *e and *i.

That being said, the first palatalization must have proceeded gradually:

*k > *kj > *č' > *č
*g > *gj > *dž' > *ž' > *ž

The most economic interpretation is that there was no difference in Proto-Slavic of *k and *g before *j, and before *e, *i, i.e. that the pronunciation was *kj, *gj. *j was then lost after palatalized velars (or affricates) in Common Slavic period of iotation of other consonants.

With that in mind, consonants */č/ and */ž/, which are usually reconstructed in the phonemic inventory of Proto-Slavic in the literature, were likely to be just phonologically predictable allophones of */k/, and */g/, and have remained such until conditions were met after the 600 CE for their appearance before back vowels as well. Similarly, *š which resulted by the application of RUKI law was an allophone of */s/ after *r, *u, *k, *i, but when *š emerged from Proto-Slavic *sj, the opposition between *š and *s became phonological, i.e. */š/ became phonemicized.

== Dating ==
The first palatalization gave the same results in all Slavic languages, which shows that it probably took place before the migration of Slavs into their historical settlements, and that means probably before 500 CE. As previously mentioned, this palatalization also operated on Germanic loanwords, which the proto-Slavs probably borrowed before or not long after the Huns disrupted the Gothic hegemony (c. 375 CE). This all shows that it operated throughout the 5th century.

Further evidence on that period comes from the toponymy and the hydronymy of the upper Dnieper river, which Slavs colonized probably in the latter half of the 5th century. Before their arrival, speakers of Baltic languages populated that region, and the Baltic river-names such as Vilkesà, Akesa, Laukesà and Merkys yielded Russian equivalents Volčesa, Očesa, Lučesa, and Mereč'. This suggests that the palatalization was operable in the latter half of the 5th century.

By the time Slavs reached the south of Greece and the Adriatic coastline, in the 6th and the 7th centuries, the first palatalization no longer operated. That can be seen from the fact that Middle Greek borrowed Slavic words in palatalized forms, and also from the fact that Romance toponyms on the Adriatic undergo the second, not the first palatalization.

On the basis of this data, and on the basis of the fact that for the sound change to be complete at least three generations are needed, i.e. c. 75 years, Arnošt Lamprecht concluded that the first Slavic palatalization operated approximately from 400 to 475 CE, ±25 years.

== See also ==
- Glossary of sound laws in the Indo-European languages
