= Zdzisław Stieber =

Polish linguist (1903–1980)

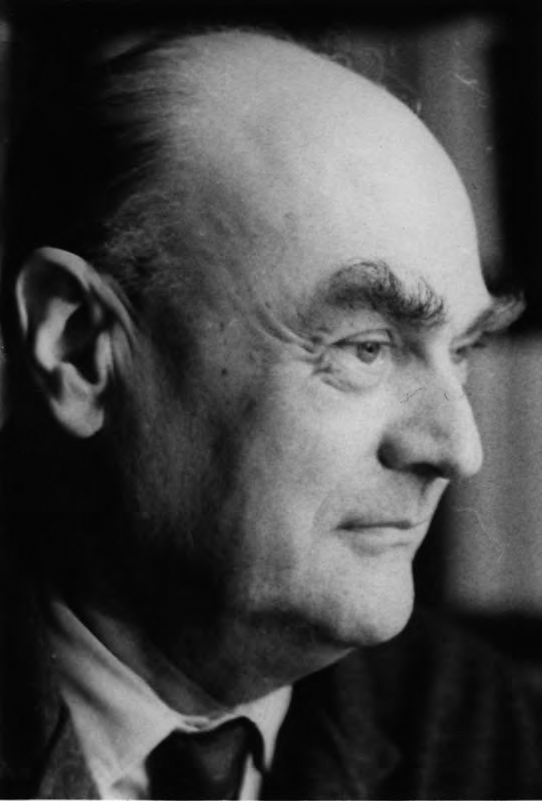
- Born: June 7, 1903; Szczakowa, Austria-Hungary (now Poland)
- Died: October 12, 1980 (aged 77); Warsaw, Poland
- Scientific career
- Fields: Slavic studies
- Institutions: Jagiellonian University, University of Łódź
- Thesis: Ze studiów nad gwarami słowackimi południowego Spisza (1929)

Zdzisław Stieber (June 7, 1903 – October 12, 1980) was a Polish linguist and Slavist. He was born in Szczakowa, then part of the Austro-Hungarian province of Galicia (since 1918 Poland). His family was of assimilated German descent in Poland for generations. He died in Warsaw.

Initially a student of chemistry, Stieber turned his attention to comparative Slavic linguistics at the University of Kraków in 1926. His interest in the dialects of border areas led him to the study of East Slovak and Ukrainian dialects, where his work focused on toponyms, their etymology, and the history and settlement of the places where they are attested. He also carried out research on Sorbian and Belarusian, and was involved in producing linguistic atlases of Kashubian (1964–78), Polish (Nitsch 1957–70), and Lemko (1956–64). Particularly valuable was his introduction of colors and symbols to dialect maps. Stieber's work in the 1930s represented some of the first studies of the dialect of the Lemko Rusyns. The deportation of this ethnic group in Operation Vistula after World War II underlines the importance of Stieber's work carried out while the community was still intact.

Stieber also produced works on the history and development of Polish (1934), Czech (1957), and Slavic in general (1969). Stieber held teaching appointments in Kraków, Lviv, Łódź, and Warsaw. His work in Polish and Slavic philology had a particularly strong influence on the introduction of the structural method in the teaching of phonology at the University of Łódź.

The Nitsch-Trnka-Stieber Law (stating that phonemic contrasts in a language can only be produced by regular sound laws or borrowing, but not as a result of analogical changes in morphophonemic rules) remains a matter of debate today (cf. Manaster-Ramer 1994).

In 1982 the Ukrainian Slavist George Y. Shevelov published an extensive reminiscence of Stieber in the journal Harvard Ukrainian Studies.

== Books ==
- Izoglosy gwarowe na obszarze dawnych województw Łęczyckiego i Sieradzkiego. Kraków: Polska Akademia Umiejętności, 1933.
- Geneza gwar laskich. Kraków: Polska Akademia Umiejętności, 1934.
- Stosunki pokrewieństwa języków łużyckich. Kraków: Uniwersytet Jagielloński, 1934.
- Krótka gramatyka języka górnołużyckiego. Kraków: Nakładem Towarzystwa Słowiańskiego, 1938.
- Sposoby powstawania słowiańskich gwar przejściowych. Kraków: Polska Akademia Umiejętności, 1938.
- Problem językowej i etnicznej odrębności Podhala. Łódź: Łódzkie Towarzystwo Naukowe, 1947.
- Toponomastyka Łemkowszczyzny, cz. 1: Nazwy miejscowości. Łódź: Łódzkie Towarzystwo Naukowe, 1948.
- Toponomastyka Łemkowszczyzny, cz. 2: Nazwy terenowe. Łódź: Łódzkie Towarzystwo Naukowe, 1949.
- Rozwój fonologiczny języka polskiego. Warszawa: Państwowe Wydawnictwo Naukowe, ¹1952. ²1958. ³1962.
  - English translation of ²1958: The Phonological Development of Polish. Ann Arbor: Department of Slavic Languages and Literatures, 1968. Translated by E. Schwartz, foreword by Edward Stankiewicz.
- Atlas językowy dawnej Łemkowszczyzny, vols. 1–8. Łódź: Zakład Narodowy im. Ossolińskich, 1956–1964.
- Zarys dialektologii języków zachodniosłowiańskich z wyborem tekstów gwarowych. Warszawa: Państwowe Wydawnictwo Naukowe, ¹1956. ²1965
- with Tadeusz Lehr-Spławiński: Gramatyka historyczna języka czeskiego, cz. 1: Wstęp. Fonetyka historyczna. Dialektoktologia. Warszawa: PWN, 1957.
- Historyczna i współczesna fonologia języka polskiego. Warszawa: PWN, 1966.
- Les relations historiques entre les langues slaves de l'est et de l'ouest. Warszawa: PWN, 1966.
- Problèmes fondamentaux de la linguistique slave. Wrocław: Zakład Narodowy im. Ossolińskich, 1968.
- Zarys gramatyki porównawczej języków słowiańskich, cz. 1: Fonologia. Warszawa: PWN, 1969.
- Zarys gramatyki porównawczej języków słowiańskich, cz. 2.1: Fleksja imienna. Warszawa: PWN, 1971.
- Zarys gramatyki porównawczej języków słowiańskich, cz. 2.2: Fleksja werbalna. Warszawa: PWN, 1973.
  - the three vols. revised and published as a single volume: ²1979, ³1989, ⁴2005.
- A Historical Phonology of the Polish Language. Heidelberg: Carl Winter, 1973.
- Świat językowy Słowian. Warszawa: PWN, 1974. Selection of works, edited by A. Obrębska-Jabłońska, H. Popowska-Taborska, and J. Siatkowski.

A complete bibliography of Steiber's publications was published in:

- Rudnik-Karwatowa, Zofia (2013). "Bibliografia prac naukowych Zdzisława Stiebera". In Rembiszewska, Dorota K. (ed.). Zdzisław Stieber (1903–1980): Materiały i wspomnienia. Warszawa: Instytut Slawistyki PAN. pp. 173–215.
