= Proto-Slavic borrowings =

Loanwords into the Slavic languages

Numerous lexemes that are reconstructable for Proto-Slavic have been identified as borrowings from the languages of various tribes that Proto-Slavic speakers interacted with in either prehistoric times or during their expansion when they first appeared in history in the sixth century (the Common Slavic period). Most of the loanwords come from Germanic languages, with other contributors being Iranian, Greek, and Vulgar Latin. Slavic loanwords sparked numerous debates in the 20th century, some of which persist today.

== Note on sources ==
Linguists Max Vasmer and Oleg Trubachyov compiled and published academic dictionaries on Slavic languages that are used worldwide in academia and are considered the most accurate sources for Slavic etymology. Another etymological dictionary written by G.P. Cyganenko takes a more modern look at the theories presented by Vasmer and others, and mostly explains origins for words that are most common and is not as extensive as the works of Vasmer or Trubachev.

== Slavic and Iranian ==
Slavs in the Proto-Slavic era came into contact with various Iranian tribes, namely Scythians, Sarmatians, and Alans, who were present in vast regions of eastern and southeastern Europe in the first centuries CE. The names of two large rivers in the centre of Slavic expansion, Dnieper and Dniester, are of Iranian origin, and Iranian toponyms are found as far west as modern-day Romania.

For a long time there have been investigators who believe that the number of loanwords from Iranian languages in Proto-Slavic is substantial. Zbigniew Gołąb, for instance, argued that a vast majority of Proto-Slavic words beginning with the voiceless velar fricative *x- (where the etymology was otherwise unclear, as in *xotěti and *xovati) were actually borrowed from Iranian sources. However, other Slavists claimed that confirmed Iranianisms in Slavic are few in number. One of the least ambiguous Iranian-Slavic lexical isoglosses (possibly explained as a Slavic borrowing from Iranian) is a lone adposition: Old Persian rādiy, OCS radi.

Antoine Meillet and André Vaillant explain the alleged lack of Iranianisms in Slavic: "the civilization of warrior and partially nomadic tribes, like Scythian and Sarmatian, could have exerted only a cursory influence on the patriarchal civilization of Slavs". Meillet and Vaillant reject the outright borrowing of the Proto-Slavic word for god from Iranian, but considered that the semasiological development of the term was an Iranianism: in both Slavic and Indo-Iranian, the root that denotes deity also denotes wealth, share (Proto-Slavic *bagu > Common Slavic *bogъ, Old Persian baga, Sanskrit bhága).

Ranko Matasović has raised broad objections to the body of past Iranianist research. He criticizes Gołąb's approach as "methodologically unacceptable", emphasizing that initial *x- in Slavic has several sources, some of which have been ascertained (like PIE *#ks-) and others which have not. Matasović recommends that instances of initial *x- in Slavic should first be explained by recourse to regular Slavic sound laws, and that Iranian should be proposed as a source if and only if the etymon has been attested in Iranian, and if and only if there is additional phonetic evidence to support the proposal.

== Slavic and Germanic ==
It is uncertain when Proto-Slavic speakers first came into contact with Germanic tribes: among Common Balto-Slavic words that have centum reflexes, none of them have typical Germanic sound-features. As for Baltic languages, all their prehistoric Germanic loanwords either come from Slavic or are borrowed from Old Norse or Proto-Norse; i.e., borrowed during a period well after Slavic prehistory (which ended c. 600 CE). The conclusion is that the Proto-Germanic speakers must have lived far from the area of the subsequent spread of speakers of Proto-Balto-Slavic. Gothic loanwords into Slavic (as opposed to Baltic) occur much more frequently.

There follows a list of words which are generally held to be Germanic loanwords in Proto-Slavic:

- PSl. *asilu, donkey (OCS osьlъ) < Goth. asil- (< Lat. asellus);
- PSl. *bjōda, bowl (OCS bljudo) < Goth. biuda;
- PSl. *bōkū, letter (OCS buky) < Goth. bōkō;
- PSl. *ganeznantej, to grow healthy (OCS goneznǫti) < Goth. ganisan;
- PSl. *kōpīti, to buy (OCS kupiti) < Goth. kaupjan (< Lat. caupo) (cf. German kaufen);
- PSl. *kōsīti, to test, taste (OCS kusiti) < Goth. kausjan (semantically and phonetically close to the native Slavic word *kǫsati, meaning "to bite");
- PSl. *kuningu, duke (OCS kъnędzь) < Germanic *kuningaz (cf. OE cyning, OHG chuning);
- PSl. *lēku, cure (OCS lěkъ) < Germanic *lēka (cf. Gothic lēkareis, doctor);
- PSl. *lōku, onion, leek (OCS lukъ) < Germanic *lauka- (cf. OHG lauh, OIcel. laukr);
- PSl. *nōta, cattle (OCS nuta) < Germanic *nauta;
- PSl. *ōseringu, ear-ring (OESl. userjazъ) < Goth. ausihriggs;
- PSl. *pulku, folk (OCS plъkъ) < Germanic *fulkan (cf. OE, OHG folc);
- PSl. *skulingu, small money (OCS skъlędzь) < Goth. skilling;
- PSl. *skatu, cattle (OCS skotъ) < Germanic *skatta (cf. German Schatz, treasure);
- PSl. *smakū, fig (OCS smoky) < Goth. smakka;
- PSl. *šelmu, helmet (OCS šlěmъ) < Germanic *helma- (cf. OHG helm);
- PSl. *tūnu, fence (OCS tynъ) < Germanic *tūnaz < Celtic *dūno, fortification (cf. OIr dún);
- PSl. *xlaiwu, pigsty (OCS xlěvъ) < Germanic *hlaiwan;
- PSl. *xlajbu, bread (OCS xlěbъ) < Germanic *hlaibaz;
- PSl. *xulmu, hummock (OCS xъlmъ) < Germanic *hulma-;
- PSl. *xūzu, xūsu, house (OCS xyzъ) < Germanic *hūsan, *hūzan;
- PSl. *želdān, to compensate damage (OCS žlěsti) < Germanic *geldan, to buy out.

This set of loanwords covers diverse semantic fields, fields from which languages readily borrow words: buildings (*xūzu,*tūnu); terrain features (*xulmu); social interaction and societal structure (*pulku, *želdān, *kōpīti); animals and cattle (*asilu, *skatu).

Pronk-Tiethoff (2013) lists among possible Germanic borrowings quite a few words whose Germanic origin is generally considered refuted, including the following:

- PSl. *bergu, hill (OCS brěgъ) < Germanic *bergaz (cf. German Berg).
- PSl. *činda, child, infant (OCS čędo) < Germanic *kinda (cf. German Kind).
- PSl. *gardu, enclosed space (OCS gradъ) < Goth. gards, court.

== Slavic and Celtic ==
By the time Slavs start to appear in historical records, Celtic languages were already limited to the British Isles and modern-day France. However, during the age of classical antiquity, Celts populated the regions of Central Europe in which Slavs spread in the 6th and the 7th century, there may have been Celtic languages speakers in the regions of Slavic expansion. In the early 20th century, Shakhmatov (1912) and others proposed Celtic etymologies for many Slavic words, but they have mostly been refuted. Actually, there is no single undisputed borrowing from Celtic into Proto-Slavic.

Matasović still defends the possibility of two direct borrowings from Celtic (mainly due to the impossibility of deriving them by regular sound laws, which require the satemization of the first sound):

1. PSl. *karwā ‘cow’ (Pol. krowa, Russ. koróva, SCr. krȁva), postulated by some to be a feminine derivative of a lost masculine noun supposedly borrowed from Proto-Celtic *karwos ‘deer’ (Welsh carw, Breton karv, Cornish karow), which would in turn be a regular Celtic centum reflex of PIE *ḱr̥(h₂)-u̯o-. Lithuanian kárvė, whose accentuation matches that of the Slavic etymons, points to prehistorical Balto-Slavic borrowing, but this hypothesis does not take into account Old Prussian curwis ‘ox’, and the Slavic protoform is usually reconstructed as PSl. *kòrva, inherited with incomplete satemization from an o-grade PIE variant *ḱorh₂-u(e)h₂-.
2. PSl. *krawu ‘roof’ (OCS krovъ, Czech/Russ. krov) is traced by some to Germanic etymons with the same meaning (OE hrōf, ON hróf etc.); if Celtic mediation is assumed, from dialectal PIE *ḱrōpo- > Proto-Celtic *krāfo- (cf. MIr cró ‘enclosure’, Welsh crau ‘hovel, pigsty’). However, the Slavic preform is usually reconstructed as PSl. *kròvъ and considered a derivative of *krỳti ‘to cover, hide’. Furthermore, the Celtic words are unrelated to Germanic (< *hrōfa- < *ḱrōpo-), stemming instead from Proto-Celtic *krewo- ~ kruwo-, presumably from PIE *kreu̯h₁- ‘to hide’.

== Borrowings from unknown languages ==
There is an alternative possibility that the Proto-Slavic words refusing satemization (*karwā, *krawu, etc.) were borrowed into Pre-Proto-Slavic or perhaps even Pro-Balto-Slavic from some unknown kentum language rather than from Celtic specifically. In 1989, Georg Holzer suggested the existence of a "temematic substrate" in Proto-Slavic, comprising at least 45 words borrowed from an unknown (undocumented) Indo-European language and sharing some irregular features. In these 45 words, the standard Indo-European voiceless stops (tenues, like p, t, k) inexplicably became voiced (mediae, like b, d, g), and vice versa — a systematic irregularity that points to a specific, undocumented substrate language.

Responding to Holzer's arguments, Matasović and Kassian later compiled their own lists of possible archaic substrate words in Proto-Slavic (with Kassian doubting the Indo-European character of the substrate language).

== Slavic and Greek ==
Ancient Greek words in Proto-Slavic are identified through phonetic features, some related to Greek phonetic history, others possibly Scythian-Sarmatian or Gothic mediations. According to Vlajić-Popović, non-mediated Ancient Greek words are korablja (ark), koliba (cottage, hut), and supposedly trem (porch); Scythian mediations are haluga (fence), koš (basket), talog (dregs), kurva (whore); supposedly Gothic mediations are crkva (church) and daska (plank).

== Other Indo-European languages ==
Speculations as to contacts between Proto-Slavic speakers and other Indo-European languages are frequent in the literature on Slavic historical linguistics. Proposals include the Italic, Illyrian, Thracian, Venetic, and Armenian languages.
