= Sound correspondences between English accents =

The International Phonetic Alphabet (IPA) can be used to represent sound correspondences among various accents and dialects of the English language.

These charts give a diaphoneme for each sound, followed by its realization in different dialects. The symbols for the diaphonemes are given in bold, followed by their most common phonetic values.

== Abbreviations list ==
The following abbreviations are used in this article for regional varieties of English:

Abbreviations list
Abbreviation	Regional variety
AmE	American English
AuE	Australian English
BahE	Bahamian English
BajE	Bajan English
CaE	Canadian English
CIE	Channel Island English
EnE	English English
FiE	Fiji English
HKE	Hong Kong English
InE	Indian English
IrE	Irish English
JSE	Jamaican English
NZE	New Zealand English
PaE	Palauan English
SAE	South African English
SgE	Singapore English
SIE	Solomon Islands English
SSE	Standard Scottish English
WaE	Welsh English

See Pronunciation respelling for English for phonetic transcriptions used in different dictionaries.

== Consonants ==
English consonants
Diaphoneme (Note: This is a compromise IPA transcription, which covers most dialects of English.)	Phones	Examples
p	p	s**p**in, ti**p**
p	pʰ	**p**en
b	p	**b**ut
b	b	we**b**
t	t	s**t**ing
t	tʰ	**t**wo
t	ɾ, (Note: /t/, is pronounced [ɾ] in some positions in AmE, AuE, sometimes in EnE, and in American-influenced HKE.) ʔ, (Note: /t/ is pronounced [ʔ] in some positions in SSE, EnE, AmE and AuE.) t̞ (Note: /t/ is pronounced [t̞] non-initially in IrE.)	be**tt**er
d	d	**d**o, o**dd**
d	ɾ (Note: /d/ is pronounced [ɾ] if preceded and followed by vowels in GA and Australian English.)	da**dd**y
tʃ	tʃ	tea**ch**, na**t**ure
tʃ	tʃʰ	**ch**air
dʒ	dʒ	**g**in, **j**oy, e**dge**
k	k	s**k**in, uni**que**, thi**ck**
k	kʰ	**c**at, **k**ill, **q**ueen
ɡ	ɡ	**g**o, **g**et, be**g**
f	f, ɸ (Note: The labiodental fricative /f/ is often pronounced as bilabial [ɸ] after the bilabials /p/, /b/, and /m/, as in up-front GA: [ʌpˈɸɹʌnt], Cub fan GA: [ˈkʰʌbɸæn], tomfoolery GA: [ˌtʰɑmˈɸuɫəɹi].)	**f**ool, enou**gh**, lea**f**, o**ff**, **ph**oto
v	v, β, (Note: The labiodental fricative /v/ is often pronounced as bilabial [β] after the bilabials /p/, /b/, and /m/, as in upvote GA: [ˈʌpβəʊt], obviate GA: [ˈɑbβiˌeɪt], Humvee GA: [ˈhʌmβi].) w, f (Note: The phoneme /v/ according to some analyses does not exist in HKE. It is merged variably into /w/ or /f/ based on the morphological root's stress pattern.)	**v**oice, **v**erve, ha**ve**, o**f**, ver**ve**
θ	θ, t̪, f (Note: /θ/ is pronounced as a dental stop [t̪] in Irish English, Newfoundland English, Indian English, and New York English, merges with /f/ in some varieties of English English, and merges with /t/ in some varieties of Caribbean English. The dental stop [t̪] also occurs in other dialects as an allophone of /θ/. In Hong Kong English, it may merge with /f/ or /t/ based on environment.)	**th**ing, tee**th**
ð	ð, d̪, v, (Note: /ð/ is pronounced as a dental stop [d̪] in Irish English, Newfoundland English, Indian English, and New York English, merges with /v/ in some varieties of English English, and merges with /d/ in some varieties of Caribbean English. [d̪] also occurs in other dialects as an allophone of /ð/.) d (Note: Merged with /d/ in HKE.)	**th**is, brea**the**, fa**th**er
s	s	**s**ee, **c**ity, pa**ss**
z	z	**z**oo, ro**s**e
ʃ	ʃ	**sh**e, **s**ure, se**ssi**on, emo**ti**on, lea**sh**
ʒ	ʒ	**g**enre, plea**su**re, equa**ti**on, sei**zu**re, bei**ge**
h	h, ɦ, (Note: The glottal fricative /h/ is often pronounced as voiced [ɦ] between vowel sounds and after voiced consonants. Initial voiced [ɦ] occurs in some accents of the Southern Hemisphere.) ç (Note: /h/ is pronounced [ç] before the palatal approximant /j/, sometimes even replacing the cluster /hj/, and sometimes before high front vowels.)	**h**am, **h**ue
m	m, ɱ (Note: The bilabial nasal /m/ is often pronounced as labiodental [ɱ] before /f/ and /v/, as in symphony GA: [ˈsɪɱfəni], circumvent GA: [ˌsɝkəɱˈvɛnt], some value GA: [ˌsʌɱ‿ˈvæɫju̟].)	**m**an, ha**m**
n	n	**n**o, ti**n**
ŋ	ŋ	ri**ng**er, si**ng**, (Note: In some dialects, such as Brummie, words like ringer [ˈɹɪŋə], sing [sɪŋ], which have a velar nasal [ŋ] in most dialects, are pronounced with an additional /ɡ/, like "finger": [ˈfɪŋɡə].) fi**n**ger, dri**n**k
l	l, ɫ, (Note: Velarized [ɫ] traditionally does not occur in Irish English; clear or plain [l] does not occur in Australian, New Zealand, Scottish, or American English. RP, some other English accents, and South African English, however, have clear [l] in syllable onsets and dark [ɫ] in syllable rimes.) l̥, ɫ̥, (Note: Sonorants are voiceless after a fortis (voiceless) stop at the beginning of a stressed syllable.) ɤ, o, (Note: L-vocalization in which l is pronounced as a kind of a back vowel ([ɤ] or [o], or non-syllabic [ɤ̯, o̯], forming a diphthong with the preceding vowel) occurs in New Zealand English and many regional accents, such as African-American Vernacular English, Cockney, New York English, Estuary English, Pittsburgh English, Singapore English, and Hong Kong English.)	**l**eft, be**ll**, sab**le**, p**l**ease
r	ɹʷ, ɹ, ɾ, (Note: /r/ is pronounced as a tap [ɾ] in some varieties of Scottish, Irish, Indian, Welsh, Northern England and South African English.) r, (Note: The alveolar trill [r] only occurs in some varieties of Scottish, Welsh, Indian and South African English.) ɻ, ɹ̥ʷ, ɹ̥, ɾ̥, ɻ̊, ʋ (Note: R-labialization, in which r is pronounced as [ʋ], is found in some accents in Southern England.)	**r**un, ve**r**y, p**r**obably
w	w, ʍ	**w**e, q**u**een
hw	ʍ, w (Note: Some dialects, such as Scottish English, Irish English, and many American South and New England dialects, distinguish voiceless [ʍ] from voiced [w]; see wine–whine merger and voiceless labiovelar approximant.)	**wh**at
j	j	**y**es, Ma**y**an
Marginal consonants
x	x, χ, k, kʰ, h, ɦ	lo**ch**, (Note: Marginal in most accents, and otherwise merged with /k/, see Lock–loch merger.) u**gh** (Note: This common English interjection is usually pronounced with [x] in unscripted spoken English, but it is most often read /ʌɡ/ or /ʌk/)
ç	ç (Note: /hj/ can be /ç/ in Conservative RP.)	**Hu**gh
ʔ	ʔ	uh-oh
ɬ	ɬ, l	**Ll**angefni, (Note: ɬ exists in Welsh English as an allophone of /l/ in Welsh loan words. Other dialects usually replace it with l.) **hl**ala ga**hl**e (Note: This sound exists in South African English in Zulu loan words.)
ɮ	ɮ	iban**dl**a

== Vowels ==
In the vowels charts, a separate phonetic value is given for each major dialect, alongside the words used to name their corresponding lexical sets. The diaphonemes for the lexical sets given here are based on RP and General American; they are not sufficient to express all of the distinctions found in other dialects, such as Australian English.

The groups are mostly defined such that no mergers of the sets in each group take place outside them. However, there are several mergers which are not described in the tables for practical reasons (see "Sets not merged here"). Note that in most cases, the first set in the group will never merge with the last set, similar to how the furthest points of a dialect continuum are not mutually intelligible.

=== TRAP to THOUGHT ===
Dia- phoneme (Note: This is a compromise IPA transcription, which covers most dialects of English.)	Lexical set	Examples	AmE																			AuE			BahE	BajE	CaE	Cameroonian English	CIE	EnE														FiE	HKE	InE	IrE								NZE			Newfoundland English	PaE	SSE	SIE	SAE			SgE	WaE		
Dia- phoneme	Lexical set	Examples	AAVE		Boston accent		Cajun English	California English		Chicano English	General American	Inland Northern American English	Miami accent	Mid-Atlantic accent	New York accent			Philadelphia English	Southern American English			AuE			BahE	BajE	CaE	Cameroonian English	CIE	Brummie	Southern England English				Northern England English							RP		FiE	HKE	InE	Ulster English				South-West Irish English	Dublin English		Standard Irish English	NZE			Newfoundland English	PaE	SSE	SIE	SAE			SgE	Abercraf English	Port Talbot English	Cardiff English
Dia- phoneme	Lexical set	Examples	Non-Rhotic	Rhotic	Older	Younger	Cajun English	Northern	Southern	Chicano English	General American	Inland Northern American English	Miami accent	Mid-Atlantic accent	Non-Rhotic	Older	Rhotic	Philadelphia English	Older	Non-Rhotic	Rhotic	Cultivated	General	Broad	BahE	BajE	CaE	Cameroonian English	CIE	Brummie	Cockney	Estuary English (EE)	MLE	West Country	Cumbrian	Geordie	Lancashire	Manchester	Pitmatic	Scouse	Yorkshire	Conservative	Contemporary (SSBE)	FiE	HKE	InE	Belfast	Mid-Ulster	Traditional	Ulster Scots	South-West Irish English	Local	New	Standard Irish English	Cultivated	General	Broad	Newfoundland English	PaE	SSE	SIE	Cultivated	General	Broad	SgE	Abercraf English	Port Talbot English	Cardiff English
æ	TRAP	h**a**m	ɛː~ɛə̯~eə̯		ɪə̯~eə̯~ɛɐ̯ (Note: In most of the United States (with high dialectal variation), and to a lesser degree in Canada, special /æ/ tensing systems occur.)		æ	eə~ɛə		æ~ɛə̯~eə̯	eə̯~ɛə̯~æ	eə̯~ɪə̯	æ		ɛə̯~eə̯~ɪə̯			æə̯~ɛə̯~eə̯	æɛæ~eə	eə̯~æjə		æː (Note: See bad–lad split for this distinction.)	æː~ɛː	æ̝ː~ɛː~e̞ː	æ~a	a	æ~ɛə̯	a̽	æ	a	æ~ɛ~ɛɪ	æ~a~ɛ̞	ɐ̞	æː~aː	a~ä	a	a~ä			a	a~ä	æ	aː	æ	ɛ (Note: In HKE, TRAP and DRESS, KIT and FLEECE, as well as FOOT and GOOSE undergo mergers. This pair is only distinguished by a minority of speakers with high proficiency in English.)	æ~ɛ	äː~a				æ		a	æ~a	æ	ɛ	ɛ̝	æ	æ	ä	ɑ~æ	æ	a~æ	æ~ɛ~e̞	ɛ	a	aː	aː~æː
æ	TRAP	b**a**d	æ~ɛː~ɛə̯		æ~ɛə̯	æ~ɛə̯	æ	ɛ~æ~a~ä	æ~æ̞	æ		eə̯~ɪə̯	æ		æ, ɛə̯~eə̯~ɪə̯			æ	æ~æɛæ~ɐɛɐ	æ~æjə~æ̠ɛæ̠		æː	æː~ɛː	æ̝ː~ɛː~e̞ː	æ~a	a	æ~a̝	a̽	æ	a	æ~ɛ~ɛɪ	æ~a~ɛ̞	ɐ̞	æː~aː	a~ä	a	a~ä			a	a~ä	æ	aː	æ	ɛ	æ~ɛ	äː~a				æ		a	æ~a	æ	ɛ	ɛ̝	æ	æ	ä	ɑ~æ	æ	a~æ	æ~ɛ~e̞	ɛ	a	aː	aː~æː
æ	TRAP	l**a**d	æ~ɛː~ɛə̯		æ~ɛə̯	æ~ɛə̯	æ	ɛ~æ~a~ä	æ~æ̞	æ		eə̯~ɪə̯	æ		æ, ɛə̯~eə̯~ɪə̯			æ	æ~æɛæ~ɐɛɐ	æ~æjə~æ̠ɛæ̠		æ	a̝~æ	æ~ɛ	æ~a	a	æ~a̝	a̽	æ	a	æ~ɛ	æ~a~ɛ̞	ɐ̞	æː~aː	a~ä	a	a~ä			a	a~ä	æ	a	æ	ɛ	æ~ɛ	äː~a				æ		a	æ~a	æ	ɛ	ɛ̝	æ	æ	ä	ɑ~æ	æ	a~æ	æ~ɛ~e̞	ɛ	a	a	a~æ
ɑː / æ	BATH	p**a**ss	æ~ɛː~ɛə̯		ä~a	æ~ɛə̯	æ	ɛ~æ~a~ä	æ~æ̞	æ		eə̯~ɪə̯	æ	ɑː~a	ɛə̯~eə̯~ɪə̯			æə̯~ɛə̯~eə̯	æɛ~æe	æ~æjə~æ̠ɛæ̠		äː	äː~ɐː		æ~a	aː	æ~a̝	a̽	ɑː	a	ɑː	ɑː~ɑ̟ː~ɑ̹ː	ɑː	æː~aː	a~ä	a	a~ä			a	a~ä	ɑ̟ː	ɑ̈ː~ʌ̞ː	a~ɑ	ɑ~a (Note: BATH may be /æ/ in some American-influenced HKE speakers' speech.)	äː	äː~a				æː~aː		aː		ɐː~äː			æː	æ	ä	ɑ	ɑ̟ː	ɑː	ɒː~ɔː	ä	a	a	a~æ
ɑː	PALM	f**a**ther	a~ä~ɑ		ä~a	a~ä	ɑ	ä~ɑ~ɒ		ä~a	ɑ~ä	a~ä	ɑ	ɑː	ɑ~ä			ɑ				äː	äː~ɐː		ɑ	aː	ɒ~ɑ	a̽	ɑː	ɑː	ɑː	ɑː~ɑ̟ː~ɑ̹ː	ɑː	ɒ~ɑ	äː	ɒː~ɑː	äː			aː~ɑː	äː	ɑ̟ː	ɑ̈ː~ʌ̞ː	aː	ɑ~a	äː	äː~ɑː				æː~aː		aː		ɐː~äː			æ~ɑː	ɑː	ä	ɑː	ɑ̟ː	ɑː	ɒː~ɔː	ä	aː		aː~æː
ɒ	LOT	n**o**t	a~ä~ɑ		ɒ~ɑ		ɑ	ä~ɑ~ɒ		ä~a	ɑ~ä	a~ä	ɑ	ɒ	ɑ~ä			ɑ				ɒ	ɒ~ɔ		ɑ	ɒ~ɑ	ɒ~ɑ	ɔ	ɒ	ä~ɒ~ɔ̈~ɔ	ɒ~ɔ	ɒ~ɒ̈	ɒ~ɔ			ɒ~ɑ̠	ɒ~ɔ			ɒ	ɒ~ɔ	ɒ	ɔ	ɔ		ɔ~ɒ~ä	ɒ~ɑ~ä		äː	ɔː	ä		ɑ~ɒ~ɔ	ɑ	ɒ~ɔ			ɑ	ɑ	ɔ		ɒ̈	ɒ̈~ʌ̈	ɒ̈	ɔ	ɒ		ɑ̟
ɒ / ɔː	CLOTH	**o**ff (Note: In American accents without the cot–caught merger, CLOTH words (usually words with a vowel written ⟨o⟩ preceding the fricatives /f/, /θ/ and /s/ and the velar nasal /ŋ/, e.g. off, cloth, boss, long), are pronounced with the vowel of THOUGHT, rather than the vowel of LOT as is the case in most other dialects of English, see Lot–cloth split. In American accents with the cot–caught merger (about half of today's speakers), LOT, CLOTH and THOUGHT all have the same vowel.)	ɒ(ɔ̯)~ɔ(ʊ̯)~ɔə̯		ɒ~ɑ		a	ä~ɑ~ɒ		ä~a	ɒ~ɔ~ɑ (Note: ɒ~ɔ occurs in American accents without the cot–caught merger (about half of today's speakers); the rest have ɑ.)	ɒ~ɑ	ɑ~ɔ	ɒ	ɔə̯~oə̯~ʊə̯			ɔə̯~ɒ̝ə̯	ɔo̯~ɑɒ̯	ɑɒ̯~ɑ		ɒ	ɒ~ɔ		ɔ	ɒː	ɒ~ɑ	ɔ	ɒː	ä~ɒ~ɔ̈~ɔ	ɒ~ɔ	ɒ~ɒ̈	ɒ~ɔ			ɒ~ɑ̠	ɒ~ɔ			ɒ	ɒ~ɔ	o̞ː	ɔ	ɔ		ɔ~ɒ~ä	ɒː		äː	ɔː	aː~ä		ɔː	ɒ	ɒ~ɔ			ɑː	ɑ	ɔ		ɒ̈, o̞ː	ɒ̈~ʌ̈, oː	ɒ̈, oː	ɔ	ɒ		ɑ̟
ɔː	THOUGHT	l**aw**	ɒ(ɔ̯)~ɔ(ʊ̯)~ɔə̯		ɒ~ɑ		a	ä~ɑ~ɒ		ä~a	ɒ~ɔ~ɑ	ɒ~ɑ	ɑ~ɔ	ɔː	ɔə̯~oə̯~ʊə̯			ɔə̯~ɒ̝ə̯	ɔo̯~ɑɒ̯	ɑɒ̯~ɑ		o̞ː	oː		ɔ	ɒː~ɑː	ɒ~ɑ	ɔ	oː~ɔː	o̞ː~ɔː	ɔː~ɔ̝ə̯~ɔuə̯	ɔə̯~ɔː~ɔ̝ː	oː	ɒː~ɔː		ɔː	ɒː~ɔː			o̞ː	ɒː~ɔː	o̞ː	o̞ː	ɔ		ɔː~ɒː	ɒː		äː	ɔː	aː~ä		ɒː~ɔː~oː	ɒː	oː			ɑː	ɑ	ɔ		o̞ː	oː		ɔ	ɒː		ʌ̈ː
ɔː	THOUGHT	p**au**se	ɒ(ɔ̯)~ɔ(ʊ̯)~ɔə̯		ɒ~ɑ		a	ä~ɑ~ɒ		ä~a	ɒ~ɔ~ɑ	ɒ~ɑ	ɑ~ɔ	ɔː	ɔə̯~oə̯~ʊə̯			ɔə̯~ɒ̝ə̯	ɔo̯~ɑɒ̯	ɑɒ̯~ɑ		o̞ː	oː		ɔ	ɒː~ɑː	ɒ~ɑ	ɔ	oː~ɔː	o̞ː~ɔː	oː~oʊ~ɔo	o̟ː~o̞ː	oː	ɒː~ɔː		ɔː	ɒː~ɔː			o̞ː	ɒː~ɔː	o̞ː	o̞ː	ɔ		ɔː~ɒː	ɒː		äː	ɔː	aː~ä		ɒː~ɔː~oː	ɒː	oː			ɑː	ɑ	ɔ		o̞ː	oː		ɔ	ɒː		ʌ̈ː

=== commA to FLEECE ===
Dia- phoneme (Note: This is a compromise IPA transcription, which covers most dialects of English.)	Lexical set	Examples	AmE																			AuE			BahE	BajE	CaE	Cameroonian English	CIE	EnE														FiE	HKE	InE	IrE								NZE			Newfoundland English	PaE	SSE	SIE	SAE			SgE	WaE		
Dia- phoneme	Lexical set	Examples	AAVE		Boston accent		Cajun English	California English		Chicano English	General American	Inland Northern American English	Miami accent	Mid-Atlantic accent	New York accent			Philadelphia English	Southern American English			AuE			BahE	BajE	CaE	Cameroonian English	CIE	Brummie	Southern England English				Northern England English							RP		FiE	HKE	InE	Ulster English				South-West Irish English	Dublin English		Standard Irish English	NZE			Newfoundland English	PaE	SSE	SIE	SAE			SgE	Abercraf English	Port Talbot English	Cardiff English
Dia- phoneme	Lexical set	Examples	Non-Rhotic	Rhotic	Older	Younger	Cajun English	Northern	Southern	Chicano English	General American	Inland Northern American English	Miami accent	Mid-Atlantic accent	Non-Rhotic	Older	Rhotic	Philadelphia English	Older	Non-Rhotic	Rhotic	Cultivated	General	Broad	BahE	BajE	CaE	Cameroonian English	CIE	Brummie	Cockney	Estuary English (EE)	MLE	West Country	Cumbrian	Geordie	Lancashire	Manchester	Pitmatic	Scouse	Yorkshire	Conservative	Contemporary (SSBE)	FiE	HKE	InE	Belfast	Mid-Ulster	Traditional	Ulster Scots	South-West Irish English	Local	New	Standard Irish English	Cultivated	General	Broad	Newfoundland English	PaE	SSE	SIE	Cultivated	General	Broad	SgE	Abercraf English	Port Talbot English	Cardiff English
ə	commA	**a**bout	ə																									ə~a̽~ɔ~ɪ~ɛ	ə	ə~ɐ		ə~ə̝	ə~ɐ	ə~ɔː	ə	ə~ɐ	ə							ɐ~a	ɐ (Note: The schwa is not very robust in HKE is often stressed, eg. about /a.baʊ̯t/ instead of /ə.baʊ̯t/.)	ə										ə		ə			ə~ɐ	ə		ə (Note: It is not clear whether this a true phonemic split, since the distribution of the two sounds is predictable; see Kit–bit split.)	ə			
ɪ	KIT	b**i**t	ɪ~iə̯		ɪ~ɪ̞~ɪ̈		ɪ	ɪ̞~ë̞		ɪ	ɪ~ɪ̞~ɪ̈	ɪ~ɪ̈		ɪ	ɪ~ɪ̈				ɪ	ɪ~ɪjə~iə̯		ɪ	ɪ~i	i	ɪ	ɪ		ɪ~i	ɪ	ɪ~i	ɪ	ɪ~ɪ̈		ɪ								ɪ	ɪ̞	ɪ	i (Note: In HKE, TRAP and DRESS, KIT and FLEECE, as well as FOOT and GOOSE undergo mergers.)	ɪ	ɪ̈~ë		ə~ɘ	ɛ	ɪ				ɪ̈	ə		ɪ	ɪ	ɪ~ë̞~ə~ʌ	ɪ	ɪ	ɪ̈	ə	ɪ~i	ɪ		ɪ̞
ɪ	KIT	k**i**t	ɪ~iə̯		ɪ~ɪ̞~ɪ̈		ɪ	ɪ̞~ë̞		ɪ	ɪ~ɪ̞~ɪ̈	ɪ~ɪ̈		ɪ	ɪ~ɪ̈				ɪ	ɪ~ɪjə~iə̯		ɪ	ɪ~i	i	ɪ	ɪ		ɪ~i	ɪ	ɪ~i	ɪ	ɪ~ɪ̈		ɪ								ɪ	ɪ̞	ɪ	i	ɪ	ɪ̈~ë		ə~ɘ	ɛ	ɪ				ɪ̈	ə		ɪ	ɪ	ɪ~ë̞~ə~ʌ	ɪ	ɪ	ɪ	i	ɪ~i	ɪ		ɪ̞
i	happY	cit**y**	ɪ~i		i		ɪ~i	ɪi̯~i		i	ɪi̯~i			ɪ~ɪ̞	ɪi̯~i			i	ɪ			ɪi̯~iː		ɪi̯~əi̯	ɪ	iː	i	i	iː~i	əi̯~i	i	ɪi̯~iː	iː	ei~ɪi	i		ɪ~e		i		ɪ~e	ɪ	ɪi̯~iː	i	i	iː	e				iː				ɪi̯	ɪi̯~əi̯		i	i	e~ɪ~i	i	ɪ	iː		i	iː		
iː	FLEECE	s**ee**	i					ɪi̯~i		i	ɪi̯~i			iː	ɪi̯~i			i	iː	ɪi̯~i		ɪi̯~iː		ɪi̯~əi̯	ɪi̯~i	iː	ɪi̯	ɪi̯~iː	i	əi̯~ɨi̯	əi~ɐi	ɪi̯~iː	iː	ɪi	iː, ei̯	ɪi		iː	ɪi~iː	iː, ɪ̈i̯ ~ ɪ̈ɪ̯	ɪi~iː	ɪi̯	ɪi̯~iː	i	i	iː	iː		ɪi̯	iː	iː				ɪi̯	ɪi̯~əi̯		iː	i	i	i	iː	iː		i	iː		

=== STRUT to GOOSE ===
Dia- phoneme (Note: This is a compromise IPA transcription, which covers most dialects of English.)	Lexical set	Examples	AmE																			AuE			BahE	BajE	CaE	Cameroonian English	CIE	EnE														FiE	HKE	InE	IrE								NZE			Newfoundland English	PaE	SSE	SIE	SAE			SgE	WaE		
Dia- phoneme	Lexical set	Examples	AAVE		Boston accent		Cajun English	California English		Chicano English	General American	Inland Northern American English	Miami accent	Mid-Atlantic accent	New York accent			Philadelphia English	Southern American English			AuE			BahE	BajE	CaE	Cameroonian English	CIE	Brummie	Southern England English				Northern England English							RP		FiE	HKE	InE	Ulster English				South-West Irish English	Dublin English		Standard Irish English	NZE			Newfoundland English	PaE	SSE	SIE	SAE			SgE	Abercraf English	Port Talbot English	Cardiff English
Dia- phoneme	Lexical set	Examples	Non-Rhotic	Rhotic	Older	Younger	Cajun English	Northern	Southern	Chicano English	General American	Inland Northern American English	Miami accent	Mid-Atlantic accent	Non-Rhotic	Older	Rhotic	Philadelphia English	Older	Non-Rhotic	Rhotic	Cultivated	General	Broad	BahE	BajE	CaE	Cameroonian English	CIE	Brummie	Cockney	Estuary English (EE)	MLE	West Country	Cumbrian	Geordie	Lancashire	Manchester	Pitmatic	Scouse	Yorkshire	Conservative	Contemporary (SSBE)	FiE	HKE	InE	Belfast	Mid-Ulster	Traditional	Ulster Scots	South-West Irish English	Local	New	Standard Irish English	Cultivated	General	Broad	Newfoundland English	PaE	SSE	SIE	Cultivated	General	Broad	SgE	Abercraf English	Port Talbot English	Cardiff English
ʌ	STRUT	r**u**n	ʌ~ɜ		ʌ~ɐ		ʌ	ʌ~ɜ~ɛ̠~ɐ		ʌ~ɜ~ɑ̈	ʌ~ɜ~ɐ	ʌ~ɔ	ʌ	ɐ	ʌ̈			ʌ	ɜ			ä~ɐ			ʌ		ʌ~ɜ~ɐ	ɔ	ʌ~ɔ	ɒ~ʌ~ə~ɤ~ʊ	ɐ̟~a	ɐ~ʌ̟~ɐ̟	ʌ~ʌ̝	ʌ~ʊ	ʊ	ʊ̞~ɤ	ʊ		ʊ, ʌ̈	ʊ		ɐ	ɐ~ʌ̈~ɑ̈ (Note: The STRUT vowel in BrE is highly variable in the triangle defined by ə, ʌ and ɑ, see 'STRUT for Dummies')	ʌ~ɐ	ɐ	ə~ɜ~ɐ	ɞ~ʌ̈				ʌ̈~ʊ	ʊ	ɤ~ʊ	ʌ̈~ʊ	ɐ~ä			ɔ̈	ʌ	ʌ~ɐ		ɐ~ä			ä	ə~ɜ		
ʊ	FOOT	p**u**t	ʊ~ʊ̜̈~ɵ~ø̞		ʊ			ɵ~ɘ~ə~ɤ		ʊ~ʊ̞	ʊ~ʊ̞~ɤ	ʊ~ʊ̞	ə~ɔ̝	ʊ					ʊ̈~ʏ			ʊ	ʊ~u	u	ʊ			ʊ~u	ʊ	ɤ~ʊ~ʊ̝	ʊ~ʊ̈	ʊ~ʊ̜̈	ʊ~ʊ̈		ʊ	ʊ̞~ɤ	ʊ		ʊ	ʊ		ʊ	ɵ~ɤ̈	ʊ	u (Note: In HKE, TRAP and DRESS, KIT and FLEECE, as well as FOOT and GOOSE undergo mergers.)	ʊ	ʉ			ʊ̈	ʊ	ʊ	ʊ		ʊ~ʊ̈			ʊ	ʊ	ʉ	ʊ	ʊ~ɵ			ʊ~u	ʊ		ɘ
ʊ	FOOT	h**oo**d	ʊ~ʊ̜̈~ɵ~ø̞		ʊ			ɵ~ɘ~ə~ɤ		ʊ~ʊ̞	ʊ~ʊ̞~ɤ	ʊ~ʊ̞	ə~ɔ̝	ʊ					ʊ̈~ʏ			ʊ	ʊ~u	u	ʊ			ʊ~u	ʊ	ɤ~ʊ~ʊ̝	ʊ~ʊ̈	ʊ~ʊ̜̈	ʊ~ʊ̈		ʊ	ʊ̞~ɤ	ʊ		ʊ	ʉː~ʊ	ʊ	ʊ	ɵ~ɤ̈	ʊ	u	ʊ	ʉ			ʊ̈	uː~ʊ				ʊ~ʊ̈			ʊ	ʊ	ʉ	ʊ	ʊ~ɵ			ʊ~u	ʊ		ɘ
uː	GOOSE	thr**ou**gh	ʊu̯~u		u~ʊu̯~ɵu̯		u	uː~ʉː~yː	ʉ̠ː	ʊ~uː	u̟~ʊu̯~ʉu̯~ɵu̯	u~ɵu̯	ʊu̯~ɵu̯~yː	uː	u~ʊu̯~ɤʊ̯~ɤu̯			ʉu̯	ʊu~ɵu~ʊ̈y~ʏy~ʉ̞u̟			ʊu̯	ʊ̈ʉ̯	ʊ̈ʉ̯~əʉ̯	ʉː	uː	ʉu̯	uː	uː~ʉ	əʉ̯~əu̯	əʉ~ʉː~ɨː~ʊː	ʉː~ʉ̟ː~ʏː	ʏ̝ː~ʉː	uː~ʏː	ʉː	u̟ː~ʉː,ɵʊ̯	ʊu~uː	ʏː	ʉː	ʉː, ɪ̈u̯~ɪ̈ʊ̯	ʊu~uː	ʊu̯	ʊ̈ʉ̯~ʉː~ɨ̞ɯ̯̈	u	u	uː	ʉ			ʊ̈	uː				ʊ̈ʉ̯			uː	u	ʉ	u	u̟ː	ʉː~yː	ʉː	u	uː		
uː	GOOSE	thr**ew**	ʊu̯~u		u~ʊu̯~ɵu̯		u	uː~ʉː~yː	ʉ̠ː	ʊ~uː	u̟~ʊu̯~ʉu̯~ɵu̯	u~ɵu̯	ʊu̯~ɵu̯~yː	uː	u~ʊu̯~ɤʊ̯~ɤu̯			ʉu̯	ʊu~ɵu~ʊ̈y~ʏy~ʉ̞u̟			ʊu̯	ʊ̈ʉ̯	ʊ̈ʉ̯~əʉ̯	ʉː	uː	ʉu̯	uː	uː~ʉ	əʉ̯~əu̯	əʉ~ʉː~ɨː~ʊː	ʉː~ʉ̟ː~ʏː	ʏ̝ː~ʉː	uː~ʏː	ʉː	u̟ː~ʉː,ɵʊ̯	ʊu~uː	ʏː	ʉː	ʉː, ɪ̈u̯~ɪ̈ʊ̯	ʊu~uː	ʊu̯	ʊ̈ʉ̯~ʉː~ɨ̞ɯ̯̈	u	u	uː	ʉ			ʊ̈	uː				ʊ̈ʉ̯			uː	u	ʉ	u	u̟ː	ʉː~yː	ʉː	u	ɪu̯ (Note: In Welsh English, you, yew and ewe are /juː/, /jɪu/ and /ɪu/ respectively; in most other varieties of English they are homophones.)		
juː	GOOSE	c**u**te	(j)ʊu̯~(j)u		(j)u~(j)ʊu̯~(j)ɵu̯		u	(j)uː~(j)ʉː~(j)yː	(j)ʉ̠ː	(j)ʊ~(j)u:	(j)u̟~(j)ʊu̯~(j)ʉu̯~(j)ɵu̯	(j)u~(j)ɵu̯	(j)ʊu̯~(j)ɵu̯~(j)yː	juː	(j)u~(j)ʊu̯~(j)ɤʊ̯~(j)ɤu̯			(j)ʉu̯	jʊu~jɵu~jʊ̈y~jʏy~jʉ̞u̟	(j)ʊu~(j)ɵu~(j)ʊ̈y~(j)ʏy~(j)ʉ̞u̟		jʊu̯	jʊ̈ʉ̯	jʊ̈ʉ̯~jəʉ̯	jʉː	juː	(j)ʉu̯	juː	juː~jʉ	jəʉ̯~jəu̯	jəʉ~jʉː~jɨː~jʊː	jʉː~jʉ̟ː~jʏː	jʏ̝ː~jʉː	(j)uː	jʉː	ju̟ː~jʉː,jɵʊ̯	jʊu~juː	jʏː	jʉː	jʉː, jɪ̈u̯~jɪ̈ʊ̯	jʊu~juː	jʊu̯	jʊ̈ʉ̯~jʉː~jɨ̞ɯ̯̈	ju		juː	jʉ			jʊ̈	juː				jʊ̈ʉ̯			juː	ju	jʉ	ju	ju̟ː	jʉː~jyː	jʉː	ju	ɪu̯		

=== PRICE to CHOICE ===
Dia- phoneme (Note: This is a compromise IPA transcription, which covers most dialects of English.)	Lexical set	Examples	AmE																			AuE			BahE	BajE	CaE	Cameroonian English	CIE	EnE														FiE	HKE	InE	IrE								NZE			Newfoundland English	PaE	SSE	SIE	SAE			SgE	WaE		
Dia- phoneme	Lexical set	Examples	AAVE		Boston accent		Cajun English	California English		Chicano English	General American	Inland Northern American English	Miami accent	Mid-Atlantic accent	New York accent			Philadelphia English	Southern American English			AuE			BahE	BajE	CaE	Cameroonian English	CIE	Brummie	Southern England English				Northern England English							RP		FiE	HKE	InE	Ulster English				South-West Irish English	Dublin English		Standard Irish English	NZE			Newfoundland English	PaE	SSE	SIE	SAE			SgE	Abercraf English	Port Talbot English	Cardiff English
Dia- phoneme	Lexical set	Examples	Non-Rhotic	Rhotic	Older	Younger	Cajun English	Northern	Southern	Chicano English	General American	Inland Northern American English	Miami accent	Mid-Atlantic accent	Non-Rhotic	Older	Rhotic	Philadelphia English	Older	Non-Rhotic	Rhotic	Cultivated	General	Broad	BahE	BajE	CaE	Cameroonian English	CIE	Brummie	Cockney	Estuary English (EE)	MLE	West Country	Cumbrian	Geordie	Lancashire	Manchester	Pitmatic	Scouse	Yorkshire	Conservative	Contemporary (SSBE)	FiE	HKE	InE	Belfast	Mid-Ulster	Traditional	Ulster Scots	South-West Irish English	Local	New	Standard Irish English	Cultivated	General	Broad	Newfoundland English	PaE	SSE	SIE	Cultivated	General	Broad	SgE	Abercraf English	Port Talbot English	Cardiff English
aɪ	PRICE	fl**igh**t	äɪ̯		ɐɪ̯ (Note: Some dialects of North American English have a vowel shift called Canadian raising, in which the first element of the diphthongs /aɪ, aʊ/ is raised in certain cases, yielding [ʌɪ̯, ʌʊ̯] or [əɪ̯, əʊ̯]. Canadian English has raising of both diphthongs, but most dialects in the United States only have raising of /aɪ/. In monosyllables, raising occurs before voiceless consonants, so right [ɹʌɪ̯t] and out [ʌʊ̯t] have raised vowels, but eyes [aɪz] and loud [laʊd] do not.)		ɑɪ̯~aː	äɪ̯	æɪ~aɪ~äɪ	ɐɪ̯	ʌɪ̯~ɜɪ̯~ɐɪ̯		aɪ̯~äː	aɪ̯	aɪ̯~äɪ̯			ɐɪ̯	ai~aæ	ɐi~äɪ~äɛ~äː		äɪ̯	ɑ̟e̯~ɑe̯	ɑe̯~ɒe̯	ɑɪ̯	ʌɪ̯	ʌɪ̯~ɜɪ̯~ɐɪ̯	a̽i	aɪ̯~ɑɪ̯~ɒɪ̯	aɪ̯~ɒɪ̯~ɔɪ̯	ɑɪ̯~ɒɪ̯~ɑ̟ə̯~ɑ̟ː	a̠ɪ̯~ɑɪ̯~ɑ̹ɪ̯	æː~aɪ̯~ɐɪ̯	ɒɪ̯~ɑɪ̯~əɪ̯	aɪ~äɪ	äi̯	aɪ~äɪ			aɪ̯~ɑɪ̯~aː	äɪ~äː	äɪ̯	ɑ̈ɪ̯~ʌ̞ɪ̯	ɐe̯	aɪ̯ ~ ɐɪ̯ (Note: Due to ongoing North American influence, HKE may be gaining Canadian raising. This belief is not universally accepted.) (Note: In HKE, the high vowels may vary in tenseness (ie. [i] instead of [ɪ], [u] instead of [ʊ]).)	äɪ̯	ɐi̯~ɜi̯				æɪ̯~ɐɪ̯	əɪ̯~ɐɪ̯	ɑɪ̯~ɐɪ̯	aɪ̯~ɑɪ̯	ɑ̟ɪ̯	ɑe̯	ɒe̯	əi	ɑɪ̯	ɜi̯, äe̯	ɑɪ̯	äɪ̯	äɪ̯~äː	ɑɪ̯~ɑ̟ː	ai̯	ɐ̟ɪ̯	ɜɪ̯	ɜi̯
aɪ	PRICE	m**y**	äː~äe̯~aː		äɪ̯		ɑɪ̯~aː	äɪ̯	æɪ~aɪ~äɪ	äɪ̯	aɪ̯~äɪ̯	aɪ̯~ae̯~æɪ̯	aɪ̯~äː	aɪ̯	ɑɪ̯~ɒɪ̯~äɪ̯			äɪ̯	aɪ~æɛ~aæ	äː~äɛ		äɪ̯	ɑ̟e̯~ɑe̯	ɑe̯~ɒe̯	ɑɪ̯	ʌɪ̯	ɑɪ̯	a̽i	aɪ̯~ɑɪ̯~ɒɪ̯	aɪ̯~ɒɪ̯~ɔɪ̯	ɑɪ̯~ɒɪ̯~ɑ̟ə̯~ɑ̟ː	a̠ɪ̯~ɑɪ̯~ɑ̹ɪ̯	æː~aɪ̯~ɐɪ̯	ɒɪ̯~ɑɪ̯~əɪ̯	aɪ~äɪ	äi̯	aɪ~äɪ			aɪ̯~ɑɪ̯~aː	äɪ~äː	äɪ̯	ɑ̈ɪ̯~ʌ̞ɪ̯	ɐe̯	aɪ̯	äɪ̯	äe̯~ɜi̯				æɪ̯~ɐɪ̯	əɪ̯~ɐɪ̯	ɑɪ̯~ɐɪ̯	aɪ̯~ɑɪ̯	ɑ̟ɪ̯	ɑe̯	ɒe̯	əi	ɑɪ̯	ɜi̯, äe̯	ɑɪ̯	äɪ̯	äɪ̯~äː	ɑɪ̯~ɑ̟ː	ai̯	ɐ̟ɪ̯	ɜɪ̯	ɜi̯
ɔɪ	CHOICE	b**oy**	oɪ̯		ɔɪ̯~oɪ̯		ɔɪ̯	ɔɪ̯~oɪ̯		oɪ̯	ɔɪ̯~oɪ̯	oɪ̯		ɔɪ̯	ɔɪ̯~oɪ̯				ɔoɪ	oi̯		o̞ɪ̯	oɪ̯		oɪ̯~ɑɪ̯	oɪ̯~ʌɪ̯	ɔɪ̯	oi	ɔɪ̯~oɪ̯	aɪ̯~ɒɪ̯~ɔɪ̯	ɔ̝ɪ~oɪ	ɔɪ̯~oɪ̯	ɔ̝ɪ̯~oɪ̯	ɔɪ̯~oɪ̯	ɔɪ	oe̯	ɔɪ			oɪ	ɔɪ	ɔɪ̯	oɪ̯	ɔɪ̯							əɪ̯~ɑɪ̯	aɪ̯~äɪ̯	ɒɪ̯~oɪ̯	ɒɪ̯	oɪ̯	oe̯		əi	ɔɪ̯	oi̯	ɔɪ̯	ɔɪ̯~ɒɪ̯	ɔɪ̯		ɔi̯	ɔɪ̯	ɒɪ̯	ʌ̈i̯

=== NEAR to lettER ===
Dia- phoneme (Note: This is a compromise IPA transcription, which covers most dialects of English.)	Lexical set	Examples	AmE																			AuE			BahE	BajE	CaE	Cameroonian English	CIE	EnE														FiE	HKE	InE	IrE								NZE			Newfoundland English	PaE	SSE	SIE	SAE			SgE	WaE		
Dia- phoneme	Lexical set	Examples	AAVE		Boston accent		Cajun English	California English		Chicano English	General American	Inland Northern American English	Miami accent	Mid-Atlantic accent	New York accent			Philadelphia English	Southern American English			AuE			BahE	BajE	CaE	Cameroonian English	CIE	Brummie	Southern England English				Northern England English							RP		FiE	HKE	InE	Ulster English				South-West Irish English	Dublin English		Standard Irish English	NZE			Newfoundland English	PaE	SSE	SIE	SAE			SgE	Abercraf English	Port Talbot English	Cardiff English
Dia- phoneme	Lexical set	Examples	Non-Rhotic	Rhotic	Older	Younger	Cajun English	Northern	Southern	Chicano English	General American	Inland Northern American English	Miami accent	Mid-Atlantic accent	Non-Rhotic	Older	Rhotic	Philadelphia English	Older	Non-Rhotic	Rhotic	Cultivated	General	Broad	BahE	BajE	CaE	Cameroonian English	CIE	Brummie	Cockney	Estuary English (EE)	MLE	West Country	Cumbrian	Geordie	Lancashire	Manchester	Pitmatic	Scouse	Yorkshire	Conservative	Contemporary (SSBE)	FiE	HKE	InE	Belfast	Mid-Ulster	Traditional	Ulster Scots	South-West Irish English	Local	New	Standard Irish English	Cultivated	General	Broad	Newfoundland English	PaE	SSE	SIE	Cultivated	General	Broad	SgE	Abercraf English	Port Talbot English	Cardiff English
ɪər	NEAR	d**eer**	iə̯(ɹ)~iɤ̯(ɹ)	iɹ	ɪə̯(ɹ)~ɪɐ̯(ɹ)		i(ɹ)~ɪ(ɹ)	ɪɹ~iɹ				iɻ~iə̯ɻ	iɹ	ɪə̯(ɹ)	ɪə̯(ɹ)~iə̯(ɹ)		ɪɹ~iɹ	iɹ	i(ɹ)		iɹ	ɪə̯(ɹ)	ɪə̯(ɹ)~ɪː(ɹ)~iː(ɹ)~iə̯(ɹ)	iː(ɹ)~iə̯(ɹ)	iə̯(ɹ)~eə̯(ɹ)	eːɹ	ɪɹ	ia̽	iə̯(ɾ)~ɪə̯(ɾ)	ɘiɐ(ɹ)~iə̯(ɹ)~ɪə̯(ɹ)~ɜː(ɹ)	iə(ɹ)~ɪː(ɹ)~ɪiɐ(ɹ)	ɪː(ɹ)~ɪə̯(ɹ)	ɪː(ɹ)	iɻ	ɪə(ɹ)	iɐ̯(ɹ)	ɪə			iɛ̯(ɾ)	ɪə̯(ɹ)		ɪ̞ː(ɹ)~ɪə̯(ɹ)	ɪə̯(ɹ)~iə̯(ɹ)	ɪə̯ ~ i.ɐ (Note: Rhoticity is present in the speech of more American-influenced HKE speakers. The NEAR, SQUARE, and CURE sets may have their schwa-like element be realised as an independent syllable.) (Note: In HKE, the high vowels may vary in tenseness (ie. [i] instead of [ɪ], [u] instead of [ʊ]).)	ɪə̯(ɾ)~iː(ɾ)	iːɹ								ɪə̯(ɹ)	ɪə̯(ɹ) (Note: Merging NEAR and SQUARE is especially common amongst young New Zealanders.)		ɛr	ɪɹ~iɹ	iə̯ɾ	ɪə̯(ɾ)~iə̯(ɾ)	ɪə̯(ɹ)		ɪə̯(ɾ)~ɪː(ɾ)	iə̯(ɹ)	iːə(ɾ)~jøː(ɾ)		iːə(ɹ)~jøː(ɹ)
ɛər	SQUARE	m**are**	ɛə̯(ɹ)	ɛɹ	ɛə̯(ɹ)~ɛɐ̯(ɹ)		ɛ(ɹ)~æ(ɹ)	eɹ		eɹ~ɛɹ		eə̯ɻ~eɻ	eɹ	ɛə(ɹ)~ɛː(ɹ)	ɛə̯(ɹ)~eə̯(ɹ)		ɛɹ~eɹ	eɹ	ɛ(j)(ɹ)		e̞ɹ~ɛ(j)ɹ	e̞ə̯(ɹ)	e̞ː(ɹ)~eː(ɹ)	eː(ɹ)~e̝ː(ɹ)	eə̯(ɹ)	eːɹ	ɛɹ	ɛ	ɛə̯(ɾ)	ɛə̯(ɹ)~ɛː(ɹ)~ɜː(ɹ)	ɛ̝ə(ɹ)~ɛː(ɹ)~ɛiə(ɹ)	ɛ̝ː(ɹ)~e̞ː(ɹ)	ɛː(ɹ)	eɻ	ɛː(ɹ)					ɪː(ɾ)~eː(ɾ)~ëː(ɾ)~ɛː(ɾ)~ ɛ̈ː(ɾ)~œː(ɾ)~əː(ɾ)~ ɘː(ɾ)~ɜː(ɾ)~ɵː(ɾ)	ɛː(ɹ)	ɛə̯(ɹ)	ɛː(ɹ)~ɛə̯(ɹ)	ɛə̯(ɹ)	ɛə̯ ~ ɛ.ɐ	ɛə̯(ɾ)~eː(ɾ)	ɚː	ɛːɹ			eːɹ				e̞ə̯(ɹ)	ɪə̯(ɹ)		ɛr	ɛɹ	eə̯ɾ	ɛə̯(ɾ)~ɛɐ̯(ɾ)	ɛə̯(ɹ)	ɛə̯(ɹ)~ɛː(ɹ)~eː(ɹ)	eː(ɾ)~e̝ː(ɾ)	ɛ(ɹ)	ɛː(ɾ)		ɛː(ɹ)~eː(ɹ)
ɜːr (ur)	NURSE	b**ur**n	ɚ	ɚ	əː(ɹ)	ɚ	ʌə(ɹ)~ʌɹ	ɝ		ɚ	ɚ~ɝ	ɚ~əɻ	ɚ	ɜː(ɹ)~əː(ɹ)	ɚ	əɪ̯	ɚ		ɜ(ɹ)		ɚ~ɐɹ	əː(ɹ)	əː(ɹ)~ɘː(ɹ)	ɘː(ɹ)~ɵː(ɹ)	ə(ɹ)~ɜ(ɹ)~ɜi̯(ɹ)	ɤ	ɚ	ɛ~ɔ	əː(ɾ)	ɵ̝ː(ɹ)~əː(ɹ)~ɜː(ɹ)	ɜː(ɹ)~ɜ̟ː(ɹ)~œ̈ː(ɹ)	ɜː(ɹ)~əː(ɹ)	əː(ɹ)	ɜɻ	ɜː~ɛ	øː(ɹ)~ɪː(ɹ)~əː(ɹ)~ɔː(ɹ)	ɜː~ɛ			ɪː(ɾ)~eː(ɾ)~ëː(ɾ)~ɛː(ɾ)~ ɛ̈ː(ɾ)~œː(ɾ)~əː(ɾ)~ ɘː(ɾ)~ɜː(ɾ)~ɵː(ɾ)	ɜː~ɛ	əː(ɹ)~ɐː(ɹ)	əː(ɹ)	əː(ɹ)~ɐː(ɹ)	ɜ	ɜː(ɾ)~äɾ	ɚː	ɚː	ɚː (Note: See Fern–fir–fur merger for this distinction in some varieties.)	ɚː	ʊːɹ		ɚː		ɵː(ɹ)			ɝ:	ɚ	ʌɾ	əː(ɾ)~ɐː(ɾ)	əː(ɹ)~ɐː(ɹ)	ø̈ː(ɹ)~ø̞̈ː(ɹ)	ø̈ː(ɾ)~ø̞̈ː(ɾ)	ə(ɹ)	əː(ɾ)	øː(ɾ)	øː(ɹ)
ɜːr (ir)	NURSE	b**ir**d	ɚ	ɚ	əː(ɹ)	ɚ	ʌə(ɹ)~ʌɹ	ɝ		ɚ	ɚ~ɝ	ɚ~əɻ	ɚ	ɜː(ɹ)~əː(ɹ)	ɚ	əɪ̯	ɚ		ɜ(ɹ)		ɚ~ɐɹ	əː(ɹ)	əː(ɹ)~ɘː(ɹ)	ɘː(ɹ)~ɵː(ɹ)	ə(ɹ)~ɜ(ɹ)~ɜi̯(ɹ)	ɤ	ɚ	ɛ~ɔ	əː(ɾ)	ɵ̝ː(ɹ)~əː(ɹ)~ɜː(ɹ)	ɜː(ɹ)~ɜ̟ː(ɹ)~œ̈ː(ɹ)	ɜː(ɹ)~əː(ɹ)	əː(ɹ)	ɜɻ	ɜː~ɛ	øː(ɹ)~ɪː(ɹ)~əː(ɹ)~ɔː(ɹ)	ɜː~ɛ			ɪː(ɾ)~eː(ɾ)~ëː(ɾ)~ɛː(ɾ)~ ɛ̈ː(ɾ)~œː(ɾ)~əː(ɾ)~ ɘː(ɾ)~ɜː(ɾ)~ɵː(ɾ)	ɜː~ɛ	əː(ɹ)~ɐː(ɹ)	əː(ɹ)	əː(ɹ)~ɐː(ɹ)	ɜ	ɜː(ɾ)~äɾ	ɚː	ɚː	ɚː	ɚː	ʊːɹ		ɚː		ɵː(ɹ)			ɝ:	ɚ	ɪɾ~ʌɾ	əː(ɾ)~ɐː(ɾ)	əː(ɹ)~ɐː(ɹ)	ø̈ː(ɹ)~ø̞̈ː(ɹ)	ø̈ː(ɾ)~ø̞̈ː(ɾ)	ə(ɹ)	əː(ɾ)	øː(ɾ)	øː(ɹ)
ɜːr (er)	NURSE	**ear**th	ɚ	ɚ	əː(ɹ)	ɚ	əɹ	ɝ		ɚ	ɚ~ɝ	ɚ~əɻ	ɚ	ɜː(ɹ)~əː(ɹ)	ɚ	əɪ̯	ɚ		ɜ(ɹ)		ɚ~ɐɹ	əː(ɹ)	əː(ɹ)~ɘː(ɹ)	ɘː(ɹ)~ɵː(ɹ)	ə(ɹ)~ɜ(ɹ)~ɜi̯(ɹ)	ɤ	ɚ	ɛ~ɔ	əː(ɾ)	ɵ̝ː(ɹ)~əː(ɹ)~ɜː(ɹ)	ɜː(ɹ)~ɜ̟ː(ɹ)~œ̈ː(ɹ)	ɜː(ɹ)~əː(ɹ)	əː(ɹ)	ɜɻ	ɜː~ɛ	øː(ɹ)~ɪː(ɹ)~əː(ɹ)~ɔː(ɹ)	ɜː~ɛ			ɪː(ɾ)~eː(ɾ)~ëː(ɾ)~ɛː(ɾ)~ ɛ̈ː(ɾ)~œː(ɾ)~əː(ɾ)~ ɘː(ɾ)~ɜː(ɾ)~ɵː(ɾ)	ɜː~ɛ	əː(ɹ)~ɐː(ɹ)	əː(ɹ)	əː(ɹ)~ɐː(ɹ)	ɜ	ɜː(ɾ)~äɾ	ɚː	ɚː	ɛːɹ	ɚː	ɛːɹ		ɚː		ɵː(ɹ)			ɝ:	ɚ	ɛɾ	əː(ɾ)~ɐː(ɾ)	əː(ɹ)~ɐː(ɹ)	ø̈ː(ɹ)~ø̞̈ː(ɹ)	ø̈ː(ɾ)~ø̞̈ː(ɾ)	ə(ɹ)	əː(ɾ)	øː(ɾ)	øː(ɹ)
ər	lettER	winn**er** (Note: Sometimes transcribed for GA as [əɹ], especially in transcriptions that represent both rhotic and non-rhotic pronunciations, as [ə(ɹ)].)	ə(ɹ)	ɚ	ə(ɹ)		əɹ	ɚ		ɚ	ɚ	ɚ~əɻ	ɚ	ə(ɹ)	ə(ɹ)		ɚ		ə(ɹ)		ɚ	ə(ɹ)				ɤ	ɚ	ə~a̽~ɔ~ɪ~ɛ	œ(ɾ)~ə(ɾ)	ə(ɹ)~ɐ(ɹ)		ə(ɹ)~ə̝(ɹ)	ə(ɹ)~ɐ(ɹ)	əɻ	ə(ɹ)~ɜ(ɹ)							ə(ɹ)		ɐ(ɹ)~a(ɹ)	ɐ	ə(ɾ)	ɚ								ə(ɹ)			ɚ	ɚ	əɾ	ə(ɾ)~ɐ(ɾ)	ə(ɹ)		ə(ɾ)	ə(ɹ)	ə(ɾ)		ə(ɹ)
ər	lettER	don**or**	ə(ɹ)	ɚ	ə(ɹ)		ʌə(ɹ)~ʌɹ	ɚ		ɚ	ɚ	ɚ~əɻ	ɚ	ə(ɹ)	ə(ɹ)		ɚ		ə(ɹ)		ɚ	ə(ɹ)				ɤ	ɚ	ə~a̽~ɔ~ɪ~ɛ	œ(ɾ)~ə(ɾ)	ə(ɹ)~ɐ(ɹ)		ə(ɹ)~ə̝(ɹ)	ə(ɹ)~ɐ(ɹ)	əɻ	ə(ɹ)~ɜ(ɹ)							ə(ɹ)		ɐ(ɹ)~a(ɹ)	ɐ	ə(ɾ)	ɚ								ə(ɹ)			ɚ	ɚ	əɾ	ə(ɾ)~ɐ(ɾ)	ə(ɹ)		ə(ɾ)	ə(ɹ)	ə(ɾ)		ə(ɹ)

=== NORTH to CURE ===
Dia- phoneme (Note: This is a compromise IPA transcription, which covers most dialects of English.)	Lexical set	Examples	AmE																			AuE			BahE	BajE	CaE	Cameroonian English	CIE	EnE														FiE	HKE	InE	IrE								NZE			Newfoundland English	PaE	SSE	SIE	SAE			SgE	WaE		
Dia- phoneme	Lexical set	Examples	AAVE		Boston accent		Cajun English	California English		Chicano English	General American	Inland Northern American English	Miami accent	Mid-Atlantic accent	New York accent			Philadelphia English	Southern American English			AuE			BahE	BajE	CaE	Cameroonian English	CIE	Brummie	Southern England English				Northern England English							RP		FiE	HKE	InE	Ulster English				South-West Irish English	Dublin English		Standard Irish English	NZE			Newfoundland English	PaE	SSE	SIE	SAE			SgE	Abercraf English	Port Talbot English	Cardiff English
Dia- phoneme	Lexical set	Examples	Non-Rhotic	Rhotic	Older	Younger	Cajun English	Northern	Southern	Chicano English	General American	Inland Northern American English	Miami accent	Mid-Atlantic accent	Non-Rhotic	Older	Rhotic	Philadelphia English	Older	Non-Rhotic	Rhotic	Cultivated	General	Broad	BahE	BajE	CaE	Cameroonian English	CIE	Brummie	Cockney	Estuary English (EE)	MLE	West Country	Cumbrian	Geordie	Lancashire	Manchester	Pitmatic	Scouse	Yorkshire	Conservative	Contemporary (SSBE)	FiE	HKE	InE	Belfast	Mid-Ulster	Traditional	Ulster Scots	South-West Irish English	Local	New	Standard Irish English	Cultivated	General	Broad	Newfoundland English	PaE	SSE	SIE	Cultivated	General	Broad	SgE	Abercraf English	Port Talbot English	Cardiff English
ɔːr	NORTH	s**or**t	oə̯(ɹ)~ɔə̯(ɹ)~ɔo̯(ɹ)	oɹ	ɔə̯(ɹ)~ɒə̯(ɹ)~ɒ(ɹ)		ɔə(ɹ)~ɔɹ	ɔɹ~oɹ		oɹ~ɔɹ	oɹ~ɔɹ	ɔɻ~oɻ	oɹ~ɔɹ	ɔə̯(ɹ)~ɔ(ɹ)	oɐ̯(ɹ)~ɔə̯(ɹ)		oɹ~ɔɹ		ɔə̯(ɹ)		ɔɹ	o̞ː(ɹ)	oː(ɹ)		ɔə̯(ɹ)	ɒːɹ~ɑːɹ	ɔɹ	ɔ	ɑː(ɾ)~əː(ɾ)	o̞ː(ɹ)~ɔː(ɹ)	ɔː(ɹ)~ɔ̝ə(ɹ)~ɔuə(ɹ), oː(ɹ)~oʊ(ɹ)~ɔo(ɹ)	o̟ː~o̞ː, ɔə̯(ɹ)~ɔː(ɹ)~ɔ̝ː	oː(ɹ)	ɔɻ~oɻ	ɔː(ɹ)~ɒː(ɹ)	ɔː(ɹ)	ɔː(ɹ)~ɒː(ɹ)			o̞ː(ɹ)	ɔː(ɹ)~ɒː(ɹ)	o̞ː(ɹ)		oː(ɹ)	ɔ (Note: Rhoticity is present in the speech of more American-influenced HKE speakers. The NEAR, SQUARE, and CURE sets may have their schwa-like element be realised as an independent syllable.)	ɔː(ɾ)~ɒː(ɾ)	ɔːɹ				äːɹ~ɑːɹ		ɒːɹ~oːɹ		oː(ɹ)			ɔ̈r	oɹ	ɔɾ	oː(ɾ)	o̞ː(ɹ)	oː(ɹ)	oː(ɾ)	ɔ(ɹ)	ɒː(ɾ)		ʌ̈ː(ɹ)
ɔːr	FORCE	t**ore**	oə̯(ɹ)~ɔə̯(ɹ)~ɔo̯(ɹ)	oɹ	ɔə̯(ɹ)~oɐ̯(ɹ)		ɔə(ɹ)~ɔɹ	ɔɹ~oɹ		oɹ~ɔɹ	oɹ~ɔɹ	ɔɻ~oɻ	oɹ~ɔɹ	ɔə̯(ɹ)~ɔ(ɹ)	oɐ̯(ɹ)~ɔə̯(ɹ)		oɹ~ɔɹ		o(u)ə(ɹ)		o(u)ɹ	o̞ː(ɹ)	oː(ɹ)		oə̯(ɹ)	oːɹ	ɔɹ	ɔ	oː(ɾ)~əː(ɾ)	o̞ː(ɹ)~ɔː(ɹ), ʌʊ̯ə(ɹ)	ɔː(ɹ)~ɔ̝ə(ɹ)~ɔuə(ɹ), oː(ɹ)~oʊ(ɹ)~ɔo(ɹ)	o̟ː~o̞ː, ɔə̯(ɹ)~ɔː(ɹ)~ɔ̝ː	oː(ɹ)	ɔɻ~oɻ	ɔː(ɹ)~ɒː(ɹ)	ɔː(ɹ)	ɔː(ɹ)~ɒː(ɹ)			o̞ː(ɹ)	ɔː(ɹ)~ɒː(ɹ)	o̞ː(ɹ)		oː(ɹ)	ɔ	ɔː(ɾ)~ɒː(ɾ)	oːɹ				ɔːɹ	ɒːɹ	oːɹ		oː(ɹ)			ɔ̈r	oɹ	o̝(ə̯)ɾ	oː(ɾ)	o̞ː(ɹ)	oː(ɹ)	oː(ɾ)	ɔ(ɹ)	oː(ɾ)		ʌ̈ː(ɹ)
ʊər	CURE	t**our**	oə̯(ɹ)~ɔə̯(ɹ)~ɔo̯(ɹ)	oɹ	ʊə̯(ɹ)~ʊɐ̯(ɹ)		uə(ɹ)~ʊə(ɹ)	ʊɹ~ɔɹ~oɹ		oɹ~ɔɹ	ʊɹ~ɔɹ~oɹ	uɻ~oɻ	uɹ~ɚ	ʊə̯(ɹ)	oɐ̯(ɹ)~ɔə̯(ɹ)		oɹ~ɔɹ		uə̯(ɹ)		uɹ~ɚ	ʊə̯(ɹ)	ʊ̈ʉ̯ə(ɹ), oː(ɹ)		uə̯(ɹ)	oːɹ	ʊɹ~ɔɹ	ɔ	uə̯(ɾ)	ɘua(ɹ)~ɘʉa(ɹ)~ʊa̯(ɹ)~ʊə̯(ɹ), ɔː(ɹ)~o̞ː(ɹ)	ʊə(ɹ)~ʊː(ɹ), ɔː(ɹ)~ɔ̝ə(ɹ)~ɔuə(ɹ), oː(ɹ)~oʊ(ɹ)~ɔo(ɹ)	o̟ː~o̞ː, ɔə̯(ɹ)~ɔː(ɹ)~ɔ̝ː	oː(ɹ)	ɔɻ~oɻ	ʊə(ɹ)	uɐ̯(ɹ)	ʊə(ɹ)			uɛ̯(ɾ)~ɪ̈u̯ə(ɾ)~ɪ̈ʊ̯ə(ɾ)~ o̞ː(ɾ)	ʊə̯(ɹ)		ɵː(ɹ)~ɤ̈ː(ɹ), o̞ː(ɹ)	oə̯(ɹ)	ʊə̯ ~ ʊ.ɐ (Note: In HKE, the high vowels may vary in tenseness (ie. [i] instead of [ɪ], [u] instead of [ʊ]).)	ʊə̯(ɾ)~uː(ɾ)	uːɹ								ʊə̯(ɹ)	ʊ̈ʉ̯ə(ɹ), oː(ɹ)		ɔ̈r	oɚ	ʉɾ	oə̯(ɾ)~oɐ̯(ɾ)	ʊə̯(ɹ)	ʊə̯(ɹ)~oː(ɹ)	oː(ɾ)	uə̯(ɹ)	uːə(ɾ)		uːə(ɹ)~ʌ̈ː(ɹ)
jʊər	CURE	p**ure**	juə̯(ɹ)~jʊə̯(ɹ)	juɹ~jʊɹ	jʊə̯(ɹ)~jʊɐ̯(ɹ)		juə(ɹ)~jʊə(ɹ)	jʊɹ~jɔɹ~joɹ		jʊɹ~jɔɹ~joɹ~jɚ	jʊɹ~juɹ~jɚ	jɚ	jʊ~juɹ~jɚ	jʊə̯(ɹ)	juɐ̯(ɹ)~juə̯(ɹ)		juɹ	jɔɹ~joɹ~jɚ	juə̯(ɹ)		juɹ~jɚ	jʊə̯(ɹ)	jʊ̈ʉ̯ə(ɹ), joː(ɹ)		juə̯(ɹ)	joːɹ	jɚ~jʊɹ~jɵɹ	jɔ	juə̯(ɾ)	jɘua(ɹ)~jɘʉa(ɹ)~jʊa̯(ɹ)~jʊə̯(ɹ), jɔː(ɹ)~jo̞ː(ɹ)	jʊə(ɹ)~jʊː(ɹ), jɔː(ɹ)~jɔ̝ə(ɹ)~jɔuə(ɹ), joː(ɹ)~joʊ(ɹ)~jɔo(ɹ)	jʉ̜ə̯(ɹ)~jʊ̜ə̯(ɹ)~jɔ̝ː(ɹ)	joː(ɹ)	jʊɻ	jʊə(ɹ)	juɐ̯(ɹ)	jʊə(ɹ)			jo̞ː(ɾ)	jʊə̯(ɹ)		jɵː(ɹ)~jɤ̈ː(ɹ), jo̞ː(ɹ)	joə̯(ɹ)	jʊə̯ ~ jʊ.ɐ	jʊə̯(ɾ)~juː(ɾ)	juːɹ								jʊə̯(ɹ)	jʊ̈ʉ̯ə(ɹ), joː(ɹ)		jɔ̈r	joɚ	jʉɾ	joə̯(ɾ)~joɐ̯(ɾ)	jʊə̯(ɹ)	jʊə̯(ɹ)~joː(ɹ)	joː(ɾ)	jɔ(ɹ)	ɪuːə(ɾ)		juːə(ɹ)~jʌ̈ː(ɹ)

=== Sets not merged here ===
In the tables above, the mergers of the FACE, DRESS, GOAT, MOUTH, and START lexical sets are not included because of space limitations. These mergers are instead described below:

- FACE may merge with happY in Scottish English.
- DRESS may completely merge with TRAP in Singaporean Standard English and Hong Kong English.
- GOAT may merge with THOUGHT in various North England Englishes.
- MOUTH may merge with PRICE in General South African English.
- START may completely merge with TRAP, BATH and PALM in Cameroonian English.
- CURE may merge with THOUGHT in many varieties, including Standard Southern British English.

Dia- phoneme (Note: This is a compromise IPA transcription, which covers most dialects of English.)	Lexical set	Examples	AmE																			AuE			BahE	BajE	CaE	Cameroonian English	CIE	EnE														FiE	HKE	InE	IrE								NZE			Newfoundland English	PaE	SSE	SIE	SAE			SgE	WaE		
Dia- phoneme	Lexical set	Examples	AAVE		Boston accent		Cajun English	California English		Chicano English	General American	Inland Northern American English	Miami accent	Mid-Atlantic accent	New York accent			Philadelphia English	Southern American English			AuE			BahE	BajE	CaE	Cameroonian English	CIE	Brummie	Southern England English				Northern England English							RP		FiE	HKE	InE	Ulster English				South-West Irish English	Dublin English		Standard Irish English	NZE			Newfoundland English	PaE	SSE	SIE	SAE			SgE	Abercraf English	Port Talbot English	Cardiff English
Dia- phoneme	Lexical set	Examples	Non-Rhotic	Rhotic	Older	Younger	Cajun English	Northern	Southern	Chicano English	General American	Inland Northern American English	Miami accent	Mid-Atlantic accent	Non-Rhotic	Older	Rhotic	Philadelphia English	Older	Non-Rhotic	Rhotic	Cultivated	General	Broad	BahE	BajE	CaE	Cameroonian English	CIE	Brummie	Cockney	Estuary English (EE)	MLE	West Country	Cumbrian	Geordie	Lancashire	Manchester	Pitmatic	Scouse	Yorkshire	Conservative	Contemporary (SSBE)	FiE	HKE	InE	Belfast	Mid-Ulster	Traditional	Ulster Scots	South-West Irish English	Local	New	Standard Irish English	Cultivated	General	Broad	Newfoundland English	PaE	SSE	SIE	Cultivated	General	Broad	SgE	Abercraf English	Port Talbot English	Cardiff English
eɪ	FACE	d**a**te	eɪ̯~ɛɪ̯		eɪ̯		eː	eɪ̯~ɛɪ̯		eː	eɪ̯~eː	eɪ̯			eɪ̯~ɛɪ̯			eɪ̯	ɛɪ~ei	ɛi̯~æ̠i̯		ɛɪ̯	æɪ̯~ɐɪ̯	ɐɪ̯~äɪ̯	eɪ̯~ɛɪ̯	eɪ̯~eː~ɛ	eɪ̯	eː~ɛː	eɪ̯	ɛi̯~aɪ̯~ɐɪ̯~ʌɪ̯	æɪ~aɪ	ɛɪ̯~eɪ̯~ë̞ɪ̯	eɪ̯	eː~eɪ̯	ɛː~e̞ː	eː~eɪ̯~ɪə̯	ɛː~e̞ː	ɛɪ~e̞ɪ	ɛː~e̞ː	ɛɪ~e̞ɪ	ɛː~e̞ː	e̞ɪ̯	ɛɪ̯	eː	eɪ̯~ɛ	eː	eː~ɪː, eə̯~ɪə̯				eː	eː~eɪ̯~ɛɪ̯			ɛɪ̯	æe̯~ɐe̯	ɐe̯	ɛː~ɛɪ	eɪ̯~eː	e	eɪ̯~eː	eɪ̯	eɪ̯~ɛɪ̯~æɪ̯	æɪ̯~äɪ̯~ʌɪ̯	e	eː		ei̯
eɪ	FACE	d**ay**	eɪ̯~ɛɪ̯		eɪ̯		eː	eɪ̯~ɛɪ̯		eː	eɪ̯~eː	eɪ̯			eɪ̯~ɛɪ̯			eɪ̯	ɛɪ~ei	ɛi̯~æ̠i̯		ɛɪ̯	æɪ̯~ɐɪ̯	ɐɪ̯~äɪ̯	eɪ̯~ɛɪ̯	eɪ̯~eː~ɛ	eɪ̯	eː~ɛː	eɪ̯	ɛi̯~aɪ̯~ɐɪ̯~ʌɪ̯	æɪ~aɪ	ɛɪ̯~eɪ̯~ë̞ɪ̯	eɪ̯	eː~eɪ̯	e̞ɪ	eː~eɪ̯~ɪə̯	e̞ɪ	ɛɪ~e̞ɪ	e̞ɪ	ɛɪ~e̞ɪ	e̞ɪ	e̞ɪ̯	ɛɪ̯	eː	eɪ̯	eː	eː~ɪː, eə̯~ɪə̯				eː	eː~eɪ̯~ɛɪ̯			ɛɪ̯	æe̯~ɐe̯	ɐe̯	ɛː~ɛɪ	eɪ̯~eː	e	eɪ̯~eː	eɪ̯	eɪ̯~ɛɪ̯~æɪ̯	æɪ̯~äɪ̯~ʌɪ̯	e	eɪ̯		ei̯
ɛ	DRESS	b**e**d (Note: Often transcribed /e/ for RP, for example in Collins English Dictionary.)	ɛ~eə̯		ɛ		ɛ~æ	ɛ~æ̝		ɛ	ɛ	ɛ~ɜ	ɛ	e̞~e	ɛ				ɛ~eiə	ɛ~ɛjə		e̞	e̞~e	e~e̝	ɛ					ɛ~e	e, eɪ~eə~ɛɪ	ɛ~ɛ̞	ɛ									e̞	ɛ				ɛ̝ə̯	ɛ							e̞	e~e̝	e̝	ɛ~ɪ	ɛ			e̞	e~e̝		ɛ, e	ɛ		
ɛ	DRESS	p**e**n	ɪ~iə̯, ɛ~eə̯		ɛ		ɪ	ɛ~æ̝		ɛ	ɛ~ɪ̞	ɛ~ɜ	ɛ	e̞~e	ɛ				ɛ~eiə	ɪ~ɪjə~iə̯		e̞	e̞~e	e~e̝	ɛ					ɛ~e	e, eɪ~eə~ɛɪ	ɛ~ɛ̞	ɛ									e̞	ɛ				ɛ̝ə̯	ɛ							e̞	e~e̝	e̝	ɛ~ɪ	ɛ			e̞	e~e̝		ɛ	ɛ		
ɛ	DRESS	l**e**ngth	ɪ~iə̯, ɛ~eə̯		ɛ		i	ɛ~æ̝		ɛ	ɛ~ɪ̞	ɛ~ɜ	ɛ	e̞~e	ɛ				ɛ~eiə	ɪ~ɪjə~iə̯		e̞	e̞~e	e~e̝	ɛ					ɛ~e	e, eɪ~eə~ɛɪ	ɛ~ɛ̞	ɛ									e̞	ɛ				ɛ̝ə̯	ɛ							e̞	e~e̝	e̝	ɛ~ɪ	ɛ			e̞	e~e̝		ɛ	ɛ		
oʊ	GOAT	n**o**	ʌʊ̯~ɔʊ̯		oʊ̯~ɔʊ̯		oː	əʊ̯~ʌʊ̯~o̞ː		o̞ː~oː	oʊ̯~ʌʊ̯~o̞ː	ʌo̯~oʊ̯~o	oʊ̯~oː	o̞ʊ̯~oʊ̯	oʊ̯~ʌ̈ʊ̯			ɘʊ̯~ɜʊ̯	ɔu~ɒu	ɜʊ~ɜʊ̈~ɜʏ~ɘʊ̯		ɵ̞ʊ̯	ɜʉ̯~ɐʉ̯	ɐʉ̯~äʉ̯	oʊ̯~ɵʊ̯	oː~oə̯	oʊ̯	o	əʊ̯	ʌʊ̯~ɐʊ̯~aʊ̯	æ̈ɤ̈~æ̈ɤ̝̈~ɐɤ̈~ɐɤ̝̈~ æ̈ʊ~ɐʊ~aʊ~ɐø~ œ̈ø~ʌ̈ː~œ̈	əʏ̯~əʊ̯	oː~oʊ̯~ɵʊ̯	oʊ̯	oː~ɔː	oː~ʊə̯~ɵː	oː~ɔː	ɔʊ~ɔo	oː~ɔː	ɛʉ̯~ɛʊ̯~eʉ̯~ eʊ̯~əʉ̯~əʊ̯~ ɔʊ̯~ɒʊ̯	oː~ɔː	əʊ̯	əʉ̯	oː	oʊ̯ (Note: In HKE, the high vowels may vary in tenseness (ie. [i] instead of [ɪ], [u] instead of [ʊ]).)	oː						ʌo̯~ʌɔ̯	əʊ̯	oʊ̯~əʊ̯	ɵʊ̯	ɜʉ̯~ɐʉ̯	ɐʉ̯	ʌʊ	oː~oʊ̯	o̝	oː~oʊ̯	ɛʊ̯~œʊ̯	œʉ̯~œɤ̯̈~œː	ʌʊ̯	o	oː		ɘu̯
oʊ	GOAT	t**ow**	ʌʊ̯~ɔʊ̯		oʊ̯~ɔʊ̯		oː	əʊ̯~ʌʊ̯~o̞ː		o̞ː~oː	oʊ̯~ʌʊ̯~o̞ː	ʌo̯~oʊ̯~o	oʊ̯~oː	o̞ʊ̯~oʊ̯	oʊ̯~ʌ̈ʊ̯			ɘʊ̯~ɜʊ̯	ɔu~ɒu	ɜʊ~ɜʊ̈~ɜʏ~ɘʊ̯		ɵ̞ʊ̯	ɜʉ̯~ɐʉ̯	ɐʉ̯~äʉ̯	oʊ̯~ɵʊ̯	oː~oə̯	oʊ̯	o	əʊ̯	ʌʊ̯~ɐʊ̯~aʊ̯	æ̈ɤ̈~æ̈ɤ̝̈~ɐɤ̈~ɐɤ̝̈~ æ̈ʊ~ɐʊ~aʊ~ɐø~ œ̈ø~ʌ̈ː~œ̈	əʏ̯~əʊ̯	oː~oʊ̯~ɵʊ̯	oʊ̯	oː~ɔː	oː~ʊə̯~ɵː	oː~ɔː	ɔʊ~ɔo	oː~ɔː	ɛʉ̯~ɛʊ̯~eʉ̯~ eʊ̯~əʉ̯~əʊ̯~ ɔʊ̯~ɒʊ̯	oː~ɔː	əʊ̯	əʉ̯	oː	oʊ̯	oː						ʌo̯~ʌɔ̯	əʊ̯	oʊ̯~əʊ̯	ɵʊ̯	ɜʉ̯~ɐʉ̯	ɐʉ̯	ʌʊ	oː~oʊ̯	o̝	oː~oʊ̯	ɛʊ̯~œʊ̯	œʉ̯~œɤ̯̈~œː	ʌʊ̯	o	ou̯	oʊ̯	ɘu̯
oʊ	GOAT	s**ou**l	ʌʊ̯~ɔʊ̯		oʊ̯~ɔʊ̯		oː	ɔʊ̯~oː		o̞ː~oː	oʊ̯~ʌʊ̯~ɔʊ̯~oː	ʌo̯~oʊ̯~o	oʊ̯~oː	o̞ʊ̯~oʊ̯	ɔʊ̯~oː			oː~oʊ̯	ɔu~ɒu	ɔu̯		ɵ̞ʊ̯	ɒʊ̯~ɔʊ̯		oʊ̯~ɵʊ̯	oː~oə̯	oʊ̯	o	əʊ̯	ʌʊ̯~ɐʊ̯~aʊ̯	ɒʊ~ɔo~aɤ	ɒʊ̯~ɒɤ̯	ɔʊ̯		oː~ɔː	oː~ʊə̯~ɵː	oː~ɔː	ɔʊ~ɔo	oː~ɔː	ɛʉ̯~ɛʊ̯~eʉ̯~ eʊ̯~əʉ̯~əʊ̯~ ɔʊ̯~ɒʊ̯	oː~ɔː	əʊ̯	ɒʊ̯~ɔʊ̯	oː	oʊ̯	oː						ʌo̯~ʌɔ̯	əʊ̯	oʊ̯~əʊ̯	ɵʊ̯	ɔo̯		ʌʊ	oː~oʊ̯	o̝	oː~oʊ̯	ɛʊ̯~œʊ̯	œʉ̯~œɤ̯̈~œː	ʌʊ̯	o	ou̯	oʊ̯	ɘu̯
aʊ	MOUTH	ab**ou**t	æɔ̯~æə̯		ɐʊ̯ (Note: Some dialects of North American English have a vowel shift called Canadian raising, in which the first element of the diphthongs /aɪ, aʊ/ is raised in certain cases, yielding [ʌɪ̯, ʌʊ̯] or [əɪ̯, əʊ̯]. Canadian English has raising of both diphthongs, but most dialects in the United States only have raising of /aɪ/. In monosyllables, raising occurs before voiceless consonants, so right [ɹʌɪ̯t] and out [ʌʊ̯t] have raised vowels, but eyes [aɪz] and loud [laʊd] do not.)		aʊ̯~aː	æʊ̯~æ̈ʊ̯~äʊ̯			äʊ̯~aʊ̯~æʊ̯	äʊ̯~ɐʊ̯	æʊ̯	ɑʊ̯	aʊ̯~æʊ̯			æʊ̯~ɛɔ̯	æɒ~æɔ	æɒ̯~ɛjɔ~ɜʊ̯		äʊ̯	aɔ̯~ao̯~æɔ̯~æo̯	æo̯~æə̯~ɛo̯~ɛə̯	ao̯~ɑə̯~aɵ~aɛ̯	ʌʊ̯	ʌʊ̯~ɜʊ̯	a̽u	aʊ̯	æə̯~æʊ̯~ɛʉ̯~ɛ̝̈ʊ̯	æʊ~æə~æː~aː~æiə	æʊ̯~æʏ̯~aʊ̯~aʏ̯	ɑʊ̯~aː	æy~ɐʏ̯~ɐʊ̯~ɛɪ̯	aʊ	äu̯~æu̯~ɛu̯~əu̯~uː	aʊ		ɐʊ	aʊ		ɑ̟ʊ̯	aʊ̯	aɔ̯	aʊ̯	äʊ̯	ɐʏ̯~ɜʉ̯				ɐʊ̯~ʌʊ̯	ɛʊ̯		aʊ̯~ɛʊ̯	aʊ̯	æo̯	ɛo̯~ɛə̯	əu	ɑʊ̯	ɜʉ̯	ɑʊ̯	äʊ̯	äː	æʊ̯	au̯	ɐu̯	ɜʊ̯	ɑ̟u̯
aʊ	MOUTH	n**ow**	æɔ̯~æə̯		ɑ̟ʊ̯		aʊ̯~aː	æʊ̯~æ̈ʊ̯~äʊ̯			äʊ̯~aʊ̯~æʊ̯	äʊ̯~ɐʊ̯	æʊ̯	ɑʊ̯	aʊ̯~æʊ̯			æʊ̯~ɛɔ̯	æɒ~æɔ	æɒ̯~ɛjɔ~ɜʊ̯		äʊ̯	aɔ̯~ao̯~æɔ̯~æo̯	æo̯~æə̯~ɛo̯~ɛə̯	ao̯~ɑə̯~aɵ~aɛ̯	ʌʊ̯	äʊ̯~ɑʊ̯	a̽u	aʊ̯	æə̯~æʊ̯~ɛʉ̯~ɛ̝̈ʊ̯	æʊ~æə~æː~aː~æiə	æʊ̯~æʏ̯~aʊ̯~aʏ̯	ɑʊ̯~aː	æy~ɐʏ̯~ɐʊ̯~ɛɪ̯	aʊ	äu̯~æu̯~ɛu̯~əu̯~uː	aʊ		ɐʊ	aʊ		ɑ̟ʊ̯	aʊ̯	aɔ̯	aʊ̯	äʊ̯	ɐʏ̯~ɜʉ̯				ɐʊ̯~ʌʊ̯	ɛʊ̯		aʊ̯~ɛʊ̯	aʊ̯	æo̯	ɛo̯~ɛə̯	əu	ɑʊ̯	ɜʉ̯	ɑʊ̯	äʊ̯	äː	æʊ̯	au̯	ɐu̯	ɜʊ̯	ɑ̟u̯
ɑːr	START	**ar**m	ɑ(ɹ)~ɒ(ɹ)	ɑɹ~ɒɹ	a(ɹ)~ä(ɹ)		ɑ(ɹ)~a(ɹ)	ɑɹ		ɑɹ~ɒɹ	ɑɹ	äɻ~ɐɻ	ɑɹ	ɑ̟ə̯(ɹ)	ɒə̯(ɹ)	ɑ̟ə̯(ɹ)~ɑː(ɹ)	ɑɹ~ɒɹ	ɑɹ	ɑː(ɹ)~ɒː(ɹ)		ɑɹ~ɒɹ	äː(ɹ)	äː(ɹ)~ɐː(ɹ)		ɑː(ɹ)	aːɹ	ɑɹ~ɐɹ	a̽~a̽ː	ɑː(ɾ)	ɑː(ɹ)		ɑː(ɹ)~ɑ̟ː(ɹ)~ɑ̹ː(ɹ)	ɑː(ɹ)	äɻ	äː(ɹ)	ɒː(ɾ)~ɑː(ɹ)	äː(ɹ)			aː(ɾ)~ɑː(ɾ)	äː(ɹ)	ɑ̟ː(ɹ)	ɑ̈ː(ɹ)~ʌ̞ː(ɹ)	ɑː(ɹ)	ɑ~a (Note: Rhoticity is present in the speech of more American-influenced HKE speakers.)	äː(ɾ)	ɑɻ				æːɹ~aɹ		äːɹ~ɑɹ		ɐː(ɹ)~äː(ɹ)			ær	ɑɹ	äɾ	ɑː(ɾ)	ɑ̟ː(ɹ)	ɑː(ɹ)	ɒː(ɾ)~ɔː(ɾ)	ä(ɹ)	aː(ɾ)		aː(ɹ)~æː(ɹ)

== See also ==
- English phonology
- List of dialects of the English language
- Phonetic alphabets
- Pronunciation respelling for English
- Help:IPA/English
- Help:IPA/Conventions for English

Place →	Labial					Coronal										Dorsal					Laryngeal			
Manner ↓	Bilabial		Labiodental		Linguolabial		Dental		Alveolar		Postalveolar		Retroflex		(Alveolo-)palatal		Velar		Uvular		Pharyngeal/epiglottal		Glottal	
Nasal	m̥	m	ɱ̊	ɱ		n̼	n̪̊	n̪	n̥	n	n̠̊	n̠	ɳ̊	ɳ	ɲ̊	ɲ	ŋ̊	ŋ	ɴ̥	ɴ				
Plosive	p	b	p̪	b̪	t̼	d̼	t̪	d̪	t	d			ʈ	ɖ	c	ɟ	k	ɡ	q	ɢ	ʡ		ʔ	
Sibilant affricate							t̪s̪	d̪z̪	ts	dz	t̠ʃ	d̠ʒ	tʂ	dʐ	tɕ	dʑ								
Non-sibilant affricate	pɸ	bβ	p̪f	b̪v			t̪θ	d̪ð	tɹ̝̊	dɹ̝	t̠ɹ̠̊˔	d̠ɹ̠˔			cç	ɟʝ	kx	ɡɣ	qχ	ɢʁ	ʡʜ	ʡʢ	ʔh	
Sibilant fricative							s̪	z̪	s	z	ʃ	ʒ	ʂ	ʐ	ɕ	ʑ								
Non-sibilant fricative	ɸ	β	f	v	θ̼	ð̼	θ	ð	θ̠	ð̠	ɹ̠̊˔	ɹ̠˔	ɻ̊˔	ɻ˔	ç	ʝ	x	ɣ	χ	ʁ	ħ	ʕ	h	ɦ
Approximant		β̞		ʋ				ð̞		ɹ		ɹ̠		ɻ		j		ɰ						˷
Tap/flap		ⱱ̟		ⱱ					ɾ̥	ɾ			ɽ̊	ɽ						ɢ̆		ʡ̆		
Trill	ʙ̥	ʙ							r̥	r		r̠	ɽ̊r̥	ɽr					ʀ̥	ʀ	ʜ	ʢ		
Lateral affricate									tɬ	dɮ			tꞎ	d𝼅	c𝼆	ɟʎ̝	k𝼄	ɡʟ̝						
Lateral fricative							ɬ̪		ɬ	ɮ			ꞎ	𝼅	𝼆	ʎ̝	𝼄	ʟ̝						
Lateral approximant								l̪	l̥	l		l̠	ɭ̊	ɭ	ʎ̥	ʎ	ʟ̥	ʟ		ʟ̠				
Lateral tap/flap									ɺ̥	ɺ			𝼈̊	𝼈		ʎ̆		ʟ̆						

		BL	LD	D	A	PA	RF	P	V	U
Implosive	Voiced	ɓ			ɗ		ᶑ	ʄ	ɠ	ʛ
Implosive	Voiceless	ɓ̥			ɗ̥		ᶑ̊	ʄ̊	ɠ̊	ʛ̥
Ejective	Stop	pʼ			tʼ		ʈʼ	cʼ	kʼ	qʼ
Ejective	Affricate		p̪fʼ	t̪θʼ	tsʼ	t̠ʃʼ	tʂʼ	tɕʼ	kxʼ	qχʼ
Ejective	Fricative	ɸʼ	fʼ	θʼ	sʼ	ʃʼ	ʂʼ	ɕʼ	xʼ	χʼ
Ejective	Lateral affricate				tɬʼ			c𝼆ʼ	k𝼄ʼ	q𝼄ʼ
Ejective	Lateral fricative				ɬʼ					
Click (top: velar; bottom: uvular)	Tenuis	kʘ qʘ		kǀ qǀ	kǃ qǃ		k𝼊 q𝼊	kǂ qǂ		
Click (top: velar; bottom: uvular)	Voiced	ɡʘ ɢʘ		ɡǀ ɢǀ	ɡǃ ɢǃ		ɡ𝼊 ɢ𝼊	ɡǂ ɢǂ		
Click (top: velar; bottom: uvular)	Nasal	ŋʘ ɴʘ		ŋǀ ɴǀ	ŋǃ ɴǃ		ŋ𝼊 ɴ𝼊	ŋǂ ɴǂ	ʞ	
Click (top: velar; bottom: uvular)	Tenuis lateral				kǁ qǁ					
Click (top: velar; bottom: uvular)	Voiced lateral				ɡǁ ɢǁ					
Click (top: velar; bottom: uvular)	Nasal lateral				ŋǁ ɴǁ					
