= South-West Irish English =

Varieties of English spoken in Ireland

- Munster English
- Native to: Republic of Ireland
- Region: South-West Region, Ireland
- Language family: Indo-European: Germanic; West Germanic; North Sea Germanic; Anglo-Frisian; Anglic; English; Hiberno-English; South-West Irish English
- Writing system: Latin (English alphabet)

Language codes
- ISO 639-3: –
- Glottolog: None

Green approximately marks the South-West Irish English dialect region.

South-West Irish English (also known as South-West Hiberno-English) is a class of broad varieties of English spoken in Ireland's South-West Region (the province of Munster). Within Ireland, the varieties are best associated with either the urban working class of the South-West or traditional rural Ireland in general, and they are popularly identified by their specific city or county, such as Cork English, Kerry English, or Limerick English.

== Phonology ==
Among speakers in the South-West alone (famously Cork, Kerry, or Limerick), the vowel of DRESS raises to [ɪ] when before /n/ or /m/ (a pin–pen merger) and sentences may show a unique intonation pattern. This intonation is a slightly higher pitch followed by a significant drop in pitch on stressed long-vowel syllables (across multiple syllables or even within a single one), which is popularly heard in rapid conversation, by other English-speakers, as an undulating "sing-song" quality.

Among older speakers, /s/ and /z/ may respectively be pronounced as /ʃ/ and /ʒ/ before a consonant and so fist sounds like fished, castle like cashle, and arrest like arresht.

Certain South-West features may also exist in Ireland outside that region but typically only in rural areas. An example is the backing, slight lowering, and perhaps rounding of MOUTH towards [ɐʊ~ʌʊ~ɔʊ], so that, to a Dublin or General American speaker, about nears the sound of a boat. The consonants /θ/ and /ð/ (as in thick and those), which are typically dental in other Irish English varieties, are traditionally alveolar: [t] and [d], respectively (thus, thick and those merge to the sound of tick and doze). GOAT and FACE are preserved as long monophthongs: [oː] and [eː], respectively. Those varieties are all rhotic, like most other Irish accents, but the /r/ sound is specifically a velarised alveolar approximant: [ɹˠ]. (Among some very traditional speakers, other possible /r/ variants include a "tapped R", the alveolar tap [ɾ], or even a "uvular R", the voiced uvular fricative [ʁ], in rural south-central Ireland.)

Features shared with both rural Irish English and working-class Dublin English include the vowels in LOT, CLOTH, NORTH and THOUGHT having a more open starting point and lacking a rounded quality: [ɑ~ä]. Furthermore, for all of those varieties, PRICE and CHOICE may also lack a rounded quality, the lexical set START is very fronted ([æːɹ]), the /h/ may be dropped before /j/ (hue pronounced like you), a distinction remains between tern and turn, and <w> and <wh> remain separate sounds.

== Grammar ==
South-West Irish English allows the use of a do be habitual aspect. Examples include I do be thinking about it or she does be late and replace Standard English constructions of those sentences: I think about it (often) or she is late (usually).

Non-canonical constituent order is also possible, in which a sentence may be arranged as Thinking to steal a few eggs I was (rather than I was thinking to steal a few eggs) to give the first clause salience or emphasis.

== Sources ==
- Hickey, Raymond (2007). Irish English: History and Present-Day Forms. Cambridge, UK: Cambridge University Press. ISBN 978-0-521-85299-9.
