= Port Talbot English =

Welsh English dialect

- Native to: Wales
- Region: Port Talbot
- Language family: Indo-European: Germanic; West Germanic; Ingvaeonic; Anglic; English; British English; Welsh English; Port Talbot English
- Writing system: Latin (English alphabet)

Language codes
- ISO 639-3: –
- Glottolog: None

Port Talbot English (PTE) is a variety of Welsh English spoken in Port Talbot, generally by the working class.

== Phonetics and phonology ==
=== Consonants ===
Consonants in Port Talbot English generally follow those of Received Pronunciation. Some phonological characteristics of consonants specific to PTE include:

- Consonants can be geminated by any preceding vowel except long non-close vowels, which is most noticeable for fortis plosives and when they are in intervocalic positions. For instance, the plosives in these pairs are lengthened: lob–lobby, shunt–shunting and sit–city. In clusters, the first of any fortis elements is selected: /t/ in shunting or /s/ in nasty or simply the first consonant when there is no fortis element, as in lovely in which /v/ is lengthened.
- The voiceless stops /p, t, k/ have considerable strong aspiration [pʰʰ, tʰʰ, kʰʰ], often as a weak affricate [pɸ, ts, kx]. That is especially for the case of /t/.
- T-glottalization is uncommon but may occur word-finally.
- H-dropping also often occurs.
- /tr, dr/ are postalveolar affricates [t̠ɹ̠̊˔, d̠ɹ̠˔], as in RP.
- Like many other Welsh accents, Port Talbot English is non-rhotic, but when pronounced, /r/ is more often a tap [ɾ] than an approximant [ɹ].
- /l/ is always clear [l].
- Consonants from Welsh such as [ɬ] and [χ] are encountered in local Welsh placenames.

=== Vowels ===
==== Monophthongs ====
Monophthongs of PTE
	Front			Central	Back	
	unrounded		rounded	Central	Back	
	short	long	rounded	Central	short	long
Close	ɪ	iː			ʊ	uː
Close-mid		eː	øː			oː
Open-mid	ɛ	ɛː		ə		
Open	a	aː			ɒ	ɒː

===== Length =====
- Unstressed long vowels tend to be shortened, as seen in free wheel [fri ˈwiːl].
- Sometimes, under the same environment as geminating consonants, short vowels can be lengthened as in casserole [ˈkaːsəroːl].

===== Quality =====
- The HAPPY vowel is tense, but unlike Received Pronunciation, it is long [iː], as in the FLEECE vowel (see Happy tensing).
- Vowels corresponding to unstressed /ɪ/ in RP are as follows:
  - /ɪ/ in the inflectional suffixes -ed and -es;
  - /ə/ in the suffix -est;
  - /iː/ in prefixes like anti- and poly-.
- There is no contrastive NEAR vowel. Depending on word, it is replaced by either FLEECE (in polysyllables), a disyllabic sequence of FLEECE and COMMA /iːə/ (in monosyllables) and a monosyllabic sequence /jøː/ when word initial (including hear and here, where the /h/ is generally dropped).
- As in many other southern Welsh accents, the NURSE vowel is rounded and fronted to [øː]. However, a small minority of speakers realise it rhotically as [əɾ ~ əɹ] as in many varieties of North American English.
- The horse–hoarse merger is absent in PTE, hence the words horse /ɒː/ and hoarse /oː/ are kept distinct. /oː/ is found in fortress and important, where the horse vowel may be found in other dialects that keep the distinction.
- /ə/ is open-mid [ɜ] in stressed positions. When unstressed, it may be slightly raised to mid [ə].
- The THOUGHT vowel is mainly /ɒː/. Exceptions are before /l/ and /st/, as in all or exhaust, as well as the word saucepan, where it is replaced by the LOT vowel /ɒ/. However long /ɒː/ does appear before the cluster /ld/ and the word palsy.
- The trap–bath split is nearly absent, although the word bath along with path, laugh and its derivatives, ghastly and last(ly) have a long PALM /aː/, yet just like in Northern England, the remainder of BATH words are short /a/.
- The TRAP words bad, bag and man are often found with long /aː/.

==== Diphthongs ====
Diphthongs of PTE are /ɪʊ, eɪ, oʊ, ʌɪ, ʌʊ, ɒɪ/. PRICE words are mostly pronounced with /ʌɪ/, but there also exists a marginal /aɪ/ which appears in a small number of words, such as Dai and aye.

PTE, like Welsh dialects such as Abercraf English, has preserved several diphthong–monophthong distinctions that other varieties have not. They include:

- A distinction between /ɪʊ/ and /uː/, corresponding to the GOOSE vowel in other dialects. Thus the pairs blue/blew and grue/grew are not homophones.
  - When a word is spelt with an ⟨o⟩, the corresponding vowel is /uː/. It also occurs in the words insurance and surety.
  - The spellings ⟨u⟩, ⟨ue⟩ and ⟨ui⟩ following ⟨r⟩ are typically pronounced /uː/.
  - /uː/ can also be found in the word blue, and the sequence ⟨luC⟩, such as flute, lunatic and Pluto
  - /ɪʊ/ is found otherwise, such as crew or glue.
- The sequence /juː/ in most dialects will be rendered as /jɪʊ/ in word-initial position and after ⟨y⟩, such as use and youth. You and its derivatives can be pronounced either as /jɪʊ/ or /ɪʊ/. /ɪʊ/ is otherwise found for all other positions.
- Another distinction for the FACE and GOAT lexical sets, thus the minimal pairs pain/pane and toe/tow (see Long mid mergers). They are generally diphthongised as /eɪ/ and /oʊ/ when the spelling contains ⟨i⟩/⟨y⟩ and ⟨u⟩/⟨w⟩ respectively and monophthongised as /eː/ and /oː/ elsewhere. However, these are subject to several exceptions:
  - The FACE vowel is always diphthong word-finally or preceding a vowel. It is further seen in the suffix sequence ⟨-atiV⟩, thus café, mosaic and patience are always /eɪ/. It is usually a diphthong before a nasal (strange and came), however proper names do have a monophthong (Cambridge and James).
  - The FACE is a monophthong in bait, gait, gaiter, Jamaica, raisin, traipse and waist.
  - Before a single ⟨l⟩, the GOAT is always diphthongal, such as coal or gold. The spelling ⟨oll⟩ is diphthongal in roll, stroll and its derivatives, yet monophthongal elsewhere.
  - GOAT is monophthongal in (al)though, and morpheme-final -ow (elbow and window).
  - Own as a possessive adjective (such as your own) is monophthongal.

=== Elision and assimilation ===
- /t, d/, at the end of a morpheme or word, are very commonly elided: not good and handbag /ˈhambaɡ/, the latter with the assimilation of the nasal with the b.
- The indefinite article an (before a vowel) may be reduced to a, as in a apple /ə ˈapəl/.
- The schwa /ə/ is often elided although but it is also very common to retain it.
- The sequence co(-)op, like in the rest of South Wales, is characteristically pronounced like cop /kɒp/.
- Elisions in the phrases isn't it? /ˈɪn ɪt/, never mind /ˈnɛː ˈmʌɪn/ and there you are /ˈdɛː ˈwaː/ are very common.
- Why + negative do, such as why don't, why doesn't or why didn't is also very commonly elided to /ˈwʌɪn/.

=== Phonemic incidence ===
- Like in most of Northern England and the Midlands, tooth is pronounced with the FOOT vowel, as in /tʊθ/.
- Mauve is pronounced with./ɒː/, instead of /oː/ or /oʊ/.
- Motor is pronounced /ˈmoːtoː/, and the strong form of their is pronounced /ˈðeɪə/.
- In an address, girl and man are pronounced with the STRUT vowel /ə/.

The following features apply for only some speakers:

- Daunt and jaunt may be pronounced with /a/.
- Hose and whole may be pronounced with /uː/ and area with /eː/.
- Want may be pronounced with /ə/, instead of /ɒ/.

=== Prosody ===
- Intonation in PTE is similar to Abercraf English. One prominent pattern is that the main pitch movement is not necessarily confined to the stressed syllable but can be spread further, to the end of the word.
- Like in other Welsh accents, PTE tends to avoid having double stress patterns, making words such as Bridgend or icecream lose their secondary stress.

== Grammar ==
- Ain't commonly used as a negation.
- The Northern Subject Rule is used in present-tense verb forms and extends to personal pronouns: I goes to work, the birds sings and you says.
- Certain words have grammatical meaning unique to PTE, including after meaning 'later' and never as 'didn't'.
- Double negatives occur, much like in other vernacular English dialects.
- The prepositions on, by and for are used idiomatically, as is characteristic for South Wales accent: by here/there. Phrasal examples include what is on this? (what's the matter with this), there's times on him/her (he/she is in a temper), what's the time by you (what's a good time for you), you can't go by him/her (you can't depend on him/her) and there's gratitude for you (you're appreciated).

== Vocabulary ==
- ashman — bin man, dustman
- cam — a stride
- crachach — used everywhere in Wales; a derogatory term used to refer to members of the Establishment in the country. It can simply refer to 'posh people'.
- lose — to miss (e.g. a bus)
- poin — to pester, to nag (from Welsh poeni)
- troughing — guttering
- venter — to bet (from Welsh fentro, a mutated form of mentro)

=== Idioms ===
Examples of commonly used idiomatic phrases in PTE:

- burnt to glory — burnt to the point of ashes
- gone home — said when a piece of clothing has worn out
- possible if — in PTE it specifically means 'surely it's not that case that...'
- sure to be — a phrase that represents 'certainly' or 'without a doubt'

== Bibliography ==
- Connolly, John H. (1990), "Port Talbot English", in Coupland, Nikolas; Thomas, Alan Richard (eds.), English in Wales: Diversity, Conflict, and Change, Multilingual Matters Ltd., pp. 121–129, ISBN 1-85359-032-0
- Wells, John C. (1982), Accents of English, Vol. 2: The British Isles (pp. i–xx, 279–466), Cambridge University Press, doi:10.1017/CBO9780511611759, ISBN 0-52128540-2
