= Welsh English =

Dialect of English spoken in Wales

- Wenglish
- Native to: United Kingdom
- Region: Wales
- Ethnicity: Welsh people
- Native speakers: (undated figure of 2.5 million)
- Language family: Indo-European: Germanic; West Germanic; Ingvaeonic; Anglo-Frisian; Anglic; English; British English; Welsh English
- Early forms: Old English: Middle English; Early Modern English
- Dialects: Abercraf; Gower; Port Talbot; Cardiff
- Writing system: Latin (English alphabet)

Language codes
- ISO 639-3: –
- Glottolog: None
- IETF: en-u-sd-gbwls

Speech example
An example of a male with a South Wales accent (Rob Brydon).

Welsh English comprises the dialects of English spoken by Welsh people. The dialects are significantly influenced by Welsh grammar and often include words derived from Welsh. In addition to the distinctive words and grammar, a variety of accents are found across Wales, including those of North Wales, the Cardiff dialect, the South Wales Valleys and West Wales.

While other accents and dialects from England have affected those of English in Wales, especially in the east of the country, influence has moved in both directions, those in the west have been more heavily influenced by the Welsh language, those in north-east Wales and parts of the North Wales coastline have been influenced by Northwestern English, and those in the mid-east and the south-east Wales (composing the South Wales Valleys) have been influenced by West Country and West Midlands English, and the one from Cardiff have been influenced by Midlands, West Country, and Hiberno-English.

A colloquial portmanteau word for Welsh English is Wenglish. It has been in use since 1985.

== Pronunciation ==
=== Vowels ===
==== Short monophthongs ====
- The vowel of cat /æ/ is pronounced either as an open front unrounded vowel [a] or a more central near-open front unrounded vowel [æ̈]. In Cardiff, bag is pronounced with a long vowel [aː]. In Mid-Wales, a pronunciation resembling its New Zealand and South African analogue is sometimes heard, i.e. trap is pronounced /trɛp/.
- The vowel of end /ɛ/ is pronounced close to cardinal vowel [ɛ], similar to Standard Southern British.
- In Cardiff, the vowel of "kit" /ɪ/ sounds slightly closer to the schwa sound of above, an advanced close-mid central unrounded vowel [ɘ̟].
- The vowel of "bus" /ʌ/ is usually pronounced [ɜ~ə] and is encountered as a hypercorrection in northern areas for foot. It is sometimes manifested in border areas of north and mid Wales as an open front unrounded vowel /a/. It also manifests as a near-close near-back rounded vowel /ʊ/ without the foot–strut split in parts of North Wales influenced by Cheshire and Scouse accents, and to a lesser extent in south Pembrokeshire.
- The schwa tends to be supplanted by an /ɛ/ in final closed syllables, e.g. brightest /ˈbrəitɛst/. The uncertainty over which vowel to use often leads to hypercorrections involving the schwa, e.g. programme is often pronounced /ˈproːɡrəm/.

==== Long monophthongs ====
Monophthongs of Welsh English as they are pronounced in Abercrave, from Coupland & Thomas (1990), pp. 135–136.

Monophthongs of Welsh English as they are pronounced in Cardiff, from Coupland & Thomas (1990), pp. 93–95. Depending on the speaker, the long /ɛː/ may be of the same height as the short /ɛ/.

Diphthongs of Welsh English as they are pronounced in Abercrave, from Coupland & Thomas (1990), pp. 135–136

Diphthongs of Welsh English as they are pronounced in Cardiff, from Coupland & Thomas (1990), p. 97

- The trap-bath split is variable in Welsh English, especially among social status. In some varieties such as Cardiff English, words like ask, bath, laugh, master and rather are usually pronounced with PALM while words like answer, castle, dance and nasty are normally pronounced with TRAP. On the other hand, the split may be completely absent in other varieties like Abercraf English and most northern varieties.
- The vowel of car is often pronounced as an open central unrounded vowel [ɑ̈] and more often as a long open front unrounded vowel /aː/.
- In broader varieties, particularly in Cardiff, the vowel of bird is similar to South African and New Zealand, i.e. a mid front rounded vowel [ø̞ː].
- Most other long monophthongs are similar to that of Received Pronunciation, but words with the RP /əʊ/ are sometimes pronounced as [oː] (the toe-tow distinction) and the RP /eɪ/ as [eː] (the pane-pain distinction). An example that illustrates this tendency is the Abercrave pronunciation of play-place [ˈpleɪˌpleːs].
- In northern varieties, /əʊ/ as in coat and /ɔː/ as in caught/court may be merged into /ɔː/ (phonetically [oː]).

==== Diphthongs ====
- Fronting diphthongs tend to resemble Received Pronunciation, apart from the vowel of bite that has a more centralised onset [æ̈ɪ].
- Backing diphthongs are more varied:
  - The vowel of low in RP, other than being rendered as a monophthong, like described above, is often pronounced as [oʊ̝].
  - The word town is pronounced with a near-open central onset [ɐʊ̝].
- Welsh English is one of few dialects where the Late Middle English diphthong /iu̯/ never became /juː/, remaining as a falling diphthong [ɪʊ̯]. Thus you /juː/, yew /jɪʊ̯/, and ewe /ɪʊ̯/ are not homophones in Welsh English. As such yod-dropping never occurs: distinctions are made between choose /t͡ʃuːz/ and chews /t͡ʃɪʊ̯z/, through /θruː/ and threw /θrɪʊ̯/, which is absent in most other English varieties.

=== Consonants ===
- Most Welsh accents pronounce /r/ as an alveolar flap [ɾ] (a 'flapped r'), similar to Scottish English and some Northern English and South African accents, in place of an approximant [ɹ] like in most accents in England while an alveolar trill [r] may also be used under the influence of Welsh.
- Welsh English is mostly non-rhotic, however variable rhoticity can be found in accents influenced by Welsh, especially northern varieties. Additionally, while Port Talbot English is mostly non-rhotic like other varieties of Welsh English, some speakers may supplant the front vowel of bird with /ɚ/, like in many varieties of North American English.
- H-dropping is common in many Welsh accents, especially southern varieties like Cardiff English, but is absent in northern and western varieties influenced by Welsh.
- Some gemination between vowels is often encountered, e.g. money is pronounced [ˈmɜn.niː].
- As Welsh lacks the letter Z and the voiced alveolar fricative /z/, some first-language Welsh speakers replace it with the voiceless alveolar fricative /s/ for words like cheese and thousand, while pens (/pɛnz/) and pence merge into /pɛns/, especially in north-west, west and south-west Wales.
- In northern varieties influenced by Welsh, chin (/tʃɪn/) and gin may also merge into /dʒɪn/.
- In the north-east, under influence of such accents as Scouse, ng-coalescence does not take place, so sing is pronounced /sɪŋɡ/.
- Also in northern accents, /l/ is frequently strongly velarised [ɫː]. In much of the south-east, clear and dark L alternate much like they do in RP.
- The consonants are generally the same as RP but Welsh consonants like /ɬ/ and /x/ (phonetically [χ]) are encountered in loan words such as Llangefni and Harlech.
- [pʰ] is in free variation with [p͡ɸ] in northern dialects.

== Distinctive vocabulary and grammar ==
Aside from lexical borrowings from Welsh like bach (little, wee), eisteddfod, nain and taid (grandmother and grandfather respectively), there exist distinctive grammatical conventions in vernacular Welsh English. Examples of this include the use by some speakers of the tag question isn't it? regardless of the form of the preceding statement and the placement of the subject and the verb after the predicate for emphasis, e.g. Fed up, I am or Running on Friday, he is.

In South Wales the word where may often be expanded to where to, as in the question, "Where to is your Mam?". The word butty (Welsh: byti) is used to mean "friend" or "mate".

There is no standard variety of English that is specific to Wales, but such features are readily recognised by Anglophones from the rest of the UK as being from Wales, including the phrase look you which is a translation of a Welsh language tag.

The word tidy is among “the most over-worked Wenglish words”. It carries a number of meanings including ‘great’ or ‘excellent,’ or a large quantity. A tidy swill is a wash that includes, at the least, the hands and the face.

== Code-switching ==
As Wales has become increasingly more anglicised, code-switching has become increasingly more common.

=== Examples ===
Welsh code-switchers fall typically into one of three categories: the first category is people whose first language is Welsh and are not the most comfortable with English, the second is the inverse, English as a first language and a lack of confidence with Welsh, and the third consists of people whose first language could be either and display competence in both languages.

Welsh and English share congruence, meaning that there is enough overlap in their structure to make them compatible for code-switching. In studies of Welsh English code-switching, Welsh frequently acts as the matrix language with English words or phrases mixed in. A typical example of this usage would look like dw i'n love-io soaps, which translates to "I love soaps".

In a study conducted by Margaret Deuchar in 2005 on Welsh-English code-switching, 90 per cent of tested sentences were found to be congruent with the Matrix Language Format, or MLF, classifying Welsh English as a classic case of code-switching. This case is identifiable as the matrix language was identifiable, the majority of clauses in a sentence that uses code-switching must be identifiable and distinct, and the sentence takes the structure of the matrix language in respect to things such as subject verb order and modifiers.

== History of the English language in Wales ==
The presence of English in Wales intensified on the passing of the Laws in Wales Acts of 1535–1542, the statutes having promoted the dominance of English in Wales; this, coupled with the closure of the monasteries, which closed down many centres of Welsh education, led to decline in the use of the Welsh language.

The decline of Welsh and the ascendancy of English was intensified further during the Industrial Revolution, when many Welsh speakers moved to England to find work and the recently developed mining and smelting industries came to be manned by Anglophones. David Crystal, who grew up in Holyhead, claims that the continuing dominance of English in Wales is little different from its spread elsewhere in the world. The decline in the use of the Welsh language is also associated with the preference in the communities for English to be used in schools and to discourage everyday use of the Welsh language in them, including by the use of the Welsh Not in some schools in the 18th and 19th centuries.

== Literature ==
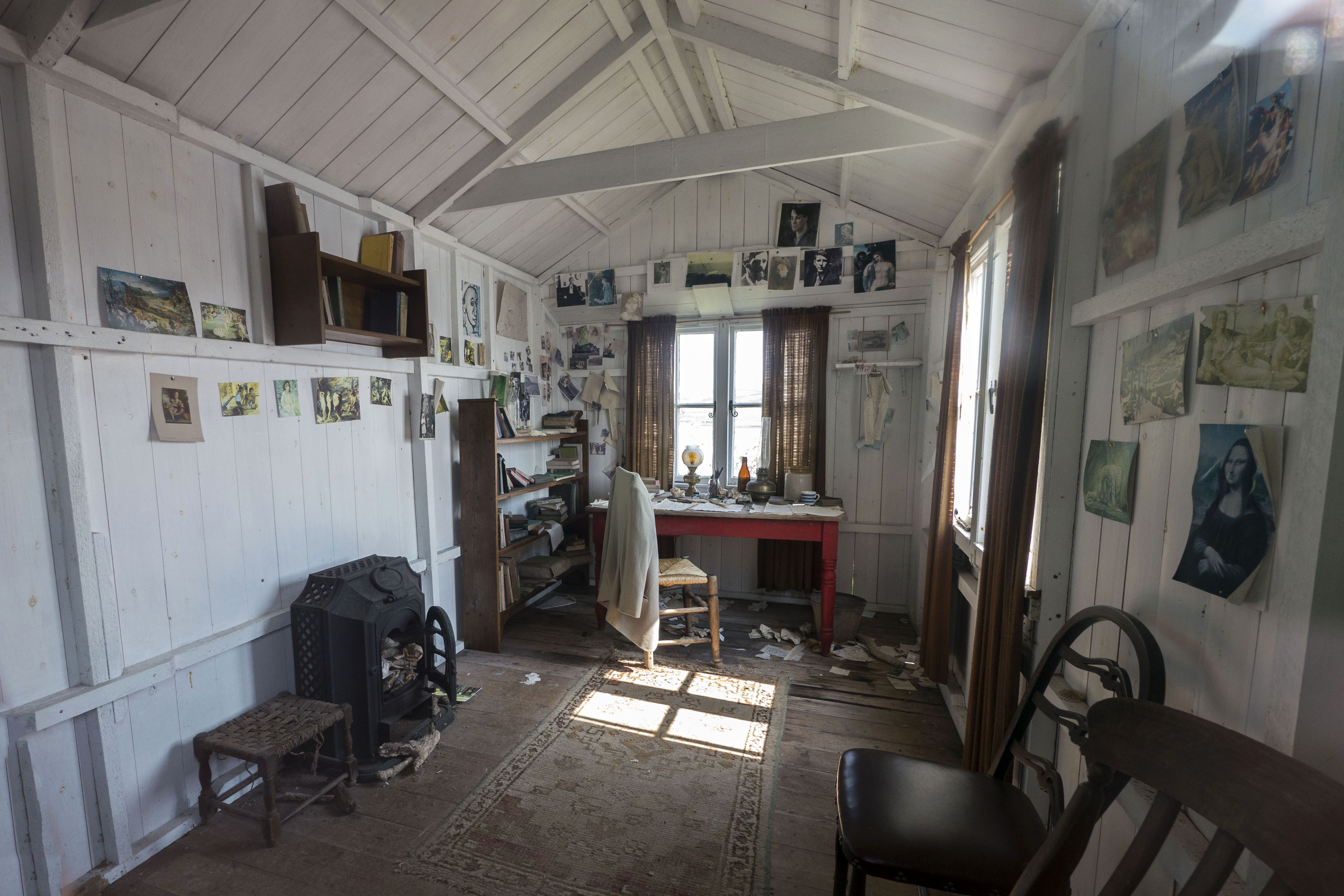
Dylan Thomas's writing shed at the Boathouse, Laugharne

"Anglo-Welsh literature" and "Welsh writing in English" are terms used to describe works written in the English language by Welsh writers. It has been recognised as a distinctive entity only since the 20th century. The need for a separate identity for this kind of writing arose because of the parallel development of modern Welsh-language literature; as such it is perhaps the youngest branch of English-language literature in the British Isles.

While Raymond Garlick discovered sixty-nine Welsh men and women who wrote in English prior to the twentieth century, Dafydd Johnston believes it is "debatable whether such writers belong to a recognisable Anglo-Welsh literature, as opposed to English literature in general". Well into the 19th century English was spoken by relatively few in Wales, and prior to the early 20th century there are only three major Welsh-born writers who wrote in the English language: George Herbert (1593–1633) from Montgomeryshire, Henry Vaughan (1622–1695) from Brecknockshire, and John Dyer (1699–1757) from Carmarthenshire.

Welsh writing in English might be said to begin with the 15th-century bard Ieuan ap Hywel Swrdwal (?1430 - ?1480), whose Hymn to the Virgin was written at Oxford in England in about 1470 and uses a Welsh poetic form, the awdl, and Welsh orthography; for example:

O mighti ladi, owr leding - tw haf

At hefn owr abeiding:

Yntw ddy ffast eferlasting
I set a braents ws tw bring.

A rival claim for the first Welsh writer to use English creatively is made for the diplomat, soldier and poet John Clanvowe (1341–1391).

The influence of Welsh English can be seen in the 1915 short story collection My People by Caradoc Evans, which uses it in dialogue (but not narrative); Under Milk Wood (1954) by Dylan Thomas, originally a radio play; and Niall Griffiths whose gritty realist pieces are mostly written in Welsh English.

== See also ==
- Cardiff English
- Abercraf English
- Gower dialect
- Port Talbot English
- Welsh literature in English
- Regional accents of English speakers
- Gallo (Brittany)
- Scots language

Other English dialects heavily influenced by Celtic languages

- Bungi dialect
- Cornish dialect
- Hiberno-English
- Highland English (and Scottish English)
- Manx English

== Bibliography ==
- Connolly, John H. (1990), "Port Talbot English", in Coupland, Nikolas; Thomas, Alan Richard (eds.), English in Wales: Diversity, Conflict, and Change, Multilingual Matters Ltd., pp. 121–129, ISBN 978-1-85359-032-0
- Coupland, Nikolas (1988), Dialect in Use: Sociolinguistic Variation in Cardiff English, University of Wales Press, ISBN 0-70830-958-5
- Coupland, Nikolas; Thomas, Alan R., eds. (1990), English in Wales: Diversity, Conflict, and Change, Multilingual Matters Ltd., ISBN 978-1-85359-032-0
- Crystal, David (4 August 2003), The Cambridge Encyclopedia of the English Language Second Edition, Cambridge University Press, ISBN 9780521530330
- Johnston, Dafydd (1994), A Pocket Guide to the Literature of Wales, Cardiff: University of Wales Press, ISBN 978-0708312650
- Garlick, Raymond (1970), "Welsh Arts Council", An introduction to Anglo-Welsh literature, University of Wales Press, ISSN 0141-5050
- Wells, John C. (1982), Accents of English, Vol. 2: The British Isles (pp. i–xx, 279–466), Cambridge University Press, pp. 377–393, doi:10.1017/CBO9780511611759, ISBN 0-52128540-2
