= Miami accent =

American English accent of South Florida

- Miami English; Miami Hispanic English
- Native to: United States
- Region: South Florida
- Ethnicity: Hispanic and Latino Americans
- Language family: Indo-European: Germanic; West Germanic; North Sea Germanic; Anglo–Frisian; Anglic; English; North American English; American English; Miami accent
- Writing system: Latin (English alphabet); American Braille

Language codes
- ISO 639-3: –

The Miami accent is an evolving American English accent or sociolect spoken in South Florida, particularly in Miami-Dade county, originating from central Miami. It is influenced by Spanish, particularly Caribbean Spanish, and is most prevalent in American-born Hispanic youth who live in the Greater Miami area.

== Origin ==
The Miami accent was developed by second- or third-generation Miamians, particularly young adults whose first language was English but were bilingual. Since World War II, Miami's population has grown rapidly every decade partly because of the postwar baby boom. In 1950, the US Census stated that Dade County's population was 495,084. Beginning with rapid international immigration from South America and the Caribbean (exacerbated by the Cuban exodus in the early 1960s), Miami's population has drastically grown every decade since. Many of the immigrants began to inhabit the urban industrial area around Downtown Miami. By 1970, the census stated that Dade County's population was 1,267,792. By 2000, the population reached 2,253,362. Growing up in Miami's urban center, second-, third-, and fourth-generation, Miamians of the immigration wave of the 1960s and 1970s developed the Miami accent. It is now the customary dialect of many citizens in the Miami metropolitan area.

In 2023 Florida International University linguistics professor Philip M. Carter and University at Buffalo doctoral student Kristen D’Alessandro Merii argued that the accent qualifies as a distinct regional dialect of American English.

== Phonology ==
The Miami accent is a native dialect of English and is not a second-language English or an interlanguage. It incorporates a rhythm and pronunciation that are heavily influenced by Spanish, whose rhythm is syllable-timed. Unlike some accents of New York Latino English, the Miami accent is rhotic.

Some specific features of the accent include the following:

- The GOAT vowel remains backed, unlike the rest of the Southeastern United States: [oʊ] or [oː].
- Extreme lowering of the FOOT vowel, towards [ə~ɔ̝].
- GOOSE fronting only occurs after coronal consonants (/t/, /d/, /s/, /z/, /n/), which have heavy fronting
- A completed cot-caught merger since 2009, though as recently as 2006 Miami English was reported as having merely a transitional merger of /ɑ/ and /ɔ/.
- The maintenance of PRICE as a diphthong [aɪ], as opposed to the monophthongal realizations found in parts of the South.
- Latino speakers may use a much more centralized TRAP vowel, approaching [ä].

The Miami accent also stereotypically includes a lack of certain features associated with standard American accents, including:

- No velarized /l/, with a more Spanish-like clear /l/ instead
- No raising of TRAP, /æ/, before nasal consonants

== Lexical characteristics ==
Speakers of the Miami accent occasionally use "calques," which are idioms directly translated from Spanish that may sound syntactically unusual to other native English speakers. For example, instead of saying, "let's get out of the car," someone from Miami might say, "let's get down from the car," which is the standard expression in Spanish "bajar del coche".

Other Miami terms especially common among Miami youth, often called "slang," include:

- "Bring" in place of "has" or "carry" when an item contains another item inside it, e.g., "This cereal brings a free toy inside." Calque of "traer", which is used for that purpose in Spanish but means "to bring".
- "Chonga": a particular South Florida Hispanic female fashion and associated youth.
- "Could" in place of "can": The word "could" is conditional, but in Miami, it is often used in place of "can" to describe something that one is allowed to do or able to do.
- "Drink a pill": Take a pill, a direct translation of the Spanish phrase "tomar una pastilla" because the Spanish verb "tomar" can mean either to drink or to take depending on context.
- "Eating shit": Literal translation of the Spanish term "comiendo mierda" which typically means that one is not doing anything of importance, or is doing something foolish.
- "Open(ed) a hole": While most Americans say "Tear/tore a hole in" or "puncture(d)," this literally translates as "opened a hole" in Spanish (abrir un hueco) and Miami-accent English.
- "¿Que bolá?" and "¿Que vuelta?": Slang terms from Cuba that have no direct translation; they essentially mean "What's up?".
- "Took the light": Running a yellow light in traffic.

== Cubonics ==
Cubonics is a popular term for Spanglish spoken by Cuban Americans in Miami. The term is a play on words of the term Ebonics which refers to African American Vernacular English.

The term for the dialect is rather new but the dialect itself has existed ever since the first Cuban exile to Miami in the 1950s. The dialect is a mix of the English language and Cuban idioms. Use of Cubonics has become so popular in Miami that a knowledge of it is considered necessary by some Cuban Americans. Language researcher Elena M. de Jongh notes that Spanglish is so widely used that court translators need knowledge of it to function proficiently.

Cubonics exists as a form of Spanglish where certain Cuban idioms are preserved in Spanish. When these idioms were translated to English they lost some of their original meaning so to preserve these meanings the phrases were continued to be said in Spanish. Cubonics also consists of the Cuban inflection and use of English words. On some occasions Cuban idioms are directly translated into English, these translations are still considered part of Cubonics.

== See also ==
- American English regional vocabulary
- North American English regional phonology
- California English
