= Palauan English =

Dialect of English

- Palauan English
- English
- Native to: Palau
- Region: Oceania
- Ethnicity: Palauans
- Language family: Indo-European: Germanic; West Germanic; Ingvaeonic; Anglo-Frisian; Anglic; English; International English; Oceanian English; Palauan English
- Early forms: Proto-Indo-European: Proto-Germanic; Proto-West Germanic; Proto-English; Old English; Middle English; Early Modern English; Modern English
- Writing system: English alphabet

Language codes
- ISO 639-3: –
- IETF: en-PW

Palauan English is an emergent dialect of English spoken by the Palauan people. The dialect arose after the arrival of American and Filipino migrants to Palau in 1962. It bears many similarities with Philippine English in phonology, morphology and syntax and has many Palauan, Japanese and Tagalog borrowings.

== Sociolinguistic situation ==
From 1885 to 1994, Palau was ruled by the colonial administrations from Spain, Germany, Japan and the United States, which left its mark on the linguistic landscape of the country. Although the periods of Spanish and German occupation did not result in a migration of speakers of the corresponding languages, there was a large influx of Japanese labourers to Palau in 1935–1941, resulting in the formation of Palauan Japanese, while English-speaking settlers also began arriving in Palau in 1945, from the United States.

Up until 1962, English-language education in Palau was very sparse. Local teachers were mostly educated in the Japanese educational system, and carried on characteristic Japanese elements such as two-year vocational schools and moral education. In 1946, anticipating a change in educational system, locals built nine new school buildings. However, they had no English textbooks or English-speaking teachers. In 1962–1980, the US increased its spending on Palau, meaning money went into education; the American schooling system was introduced, along with several hundred American volunteer teachers who arrived alongside Peace Corps volunteers and Filipino labourers.

Although some elderly residents are still bilingual in Japanese and Palauan, English has replaced Japanese as the prestige language, and Palauans nowadays mostly use Japanese to cater to Japanese tourists. Therefore, as of 2018, the sociolinguistic situation in Palau is one of English–Palauan diglossia, with English as a prestige language and Palauan as a vernacular spoken at home. English is slowly displacing Palauan, with younger Palauans inserting English words into their Palauan speech.

== History of the Palauan dialect ==
At first, the American residents did not interact with the locals; American children had their own school with American teachers and an abundance of educational materials in English. The locals had limited work contacts with Americans: the only exception were the elites who had training in English in Guam or Truk. The Filipinos, however, work as live-in domestic workers or settled working professionals including teachers, so there is substantial contact with Palauans. The American administration also purposefully taught the elites English to strengthen their position in the society. The emergence of the Palauan dialect occurred after 1962.

== Phonological features ==
Palauan English has been mostly influenced by American English, but it has many features influenced by Palauan and (to a lesser extent) Japanese language. There are many similarities between Palauan and Philippine English.

=== Consonant variations ===
- /p, t, k/ are almost never aspirated; /t/ can be realised as a tap [ɾ] or as a glottal stop.
- /b, d, g/ are often devoiced in all positions; both /t/ and /d/ can disappear in non-final positions as well as in the past tense ending -ed.
- The interdental fricatives /θ/ and /ð/ are often realized as [t̪] and [d̪].
- /z/ is almost always devoiced into [s].
- /ʃ/ is usually realised as [s]; /ʧ/ -- as [ts], /ʤ/ -- as [ts] or [s].
- Palauan English is semi-rhotic.
- /l/ is relatively velarised in the non-prevocalic position.
- a combination of a coronal consonant or /m/ and /u/ is realised as [consonant] + [u] ("mute" [mut]), but a combination of oral labials, velars, or /h/ with /u/ retain the palatal glide: "hue" [hju].

=== Vowel variations ===
The KIT and FLEECE vowels have a considerable overlap since they are close in duration. The exact realisations of the /a/ and /ɜr/ phonemes are unknown due to the large inter- and intraspeaker variability. No signs of GOOSE and GOAT fronting have been reported. NEAR and SQUARE have undergone monophthongisation.

=== Prosody and stress ===
Vowel hiatus is usually repaired with a glottal stop, but a hiatus starting with a close front vowel can be repaired with a [j] ("very angry" [veɾijaŋɡɾi]) while one starting with a close back vowel can use [w] ("go away" [ɡowawei]). Linking and intrusive /r/ are very rare because of this.

Stress is often different from other English dialects: "open" [oˈpen], "forget" [ˈfoɾɡet]. Unstressed vowels are reduced only slightly, including function words such as "my", "to", "the" and "of", which is also affected by the hiatus repairs: "the age" is [ðəʔe:ʤ], compare BrE [ðieɪʤ].

== Morphosyntax ==
=== Verbal ===
Third person verbs often have zero marking: "he have", "she always complain". Plural existentials often employ "is" or 's": "there is the veterans", "it's a lot of rivers over here". Words such as "everyone" and "everybody" agree with plural subjects: "everyone are behaved".

Preterite and past participle are used similarly to American English, but their formation is different: usually there is no marking on the verb itself while the information about time is conveyed lexically: "they already break up", "when they were young, I need someone to help me".

In construction with an auxiliary "do", the preterite form of the main verb is often used: "we did saw it".

Double negative is very rare.

The choice of verbal prepositions and verb valency are often different from major English dialects: "I get really pissed off her"; "he wanted to go Guam".

=== Nominal ===
The formation of plural nouns is highly variable with zero marking, especially after a lexically or morphologically plural word ("two hot tea"), usage of nouns that are plural in most other varieties as singular ones ("You want sunglass, I'll buy you one") and assigning plural marking to mass nouns ("fishing gears"). The word "much" is often used with count nouns while the indefinite article can precede plural nouns ("she cannot have a children").

=== Other ===
Palauan English is omitting pronouns more than most other varieties: "that's her... want to be perfect... want to do everything just right".

When comparing two things, Palauan English speakers often use double marking: the adjective receives the required suffix and an adverb: "they know more better".

Questions can be formed without the wh-movement: "where our governor is hiding?"

The usage of definite and indefinite articles is different from the Inner Circle varieties: "I saw my mother sitting on the bench outside with the blood on the dress", "I don't want my candidate to lose election". The Palauan hiatus repair strategy also results in an absence of allomorphic forms of the articles: "he's an old man".

== Vocabulary ==
Palauan English has many loanwords from Palauan ("ollei", a particle denoting emphasis and exclamation), Tagalog and Japanese ("komeng" for "sorry", from Japanese ごめん gomen), including the use of English words as translations of local cultural borrowings: "a custom" means a cultural obligation to help community members; it was first borrowed from Japanese shūkan (Japanese: 習慣) into Palauan as "siukang" and then translated into English.
