= Solomon Islands English =

Language dialect

Solomon Islands English is the dialect of English spoken by Solomon Islanders.

== Phonological features ==
Solomon Islands English has many features, especially in the phonology, that show the influence of local languages. It is also influenced by Australian English through the RAMSI program.

=== Consonant variations ===
Solomon Island English is non-rhotic.

The Letter r tends to be a tap [ɾ] or a trill [r] in Solomon Island English.

The interdental fricatives /θ/ and /ð/ are often realized as [t̪] and [d̪].

=== Vowel variations ===
KIT: [ɪ] = [kɪt]
DRESS: [ɛ] = [dɾɛs]
TRAP: [ɑ] or [æ] = [tɾɑp] or [tɾæp]
LOT: [ɔ] = [lɔt]
STRUT: [ʌ] or [ɐ] = [stɾʌt] or [strɐt]
FOOT: [ʊ] = [fʊt]
FLEECE: [i] = [flis]
FACE: [e:] or [eɪ] = [fe:s] or [feɪs]
PALM: [ɑː] = [pɑ:m]
THOUGHT: [ɔ] = [t̪ɔt] or [θɔt]
GOAT: [o:] or [oʊ̯] = [go:t] or [goʊ̯t]
NEAR: [iə̯] or [ɪə̯] = [niə̯] or [nɪə̯]
SQUARE: [ɛə̯] or [ɛɐ̯] = [skɛə̯] or [skɛɐ̯]
START: [ɑː] = [stɑ:t]
FORCE: [oː] = [fo:s]
SURE: [oə̯] or [oɐ̯] = [ʃoə̯] or [ʃoɐ̯]
BATH: [ɑ] = [bɑθ] or [bɑt̪]
NURSE: [əː] or [ɐ:] = [nə:s] or [nɐ:s]
GOOSE: [u] = [gus]
PRICE: [ɑɪ̯] = [pɾɑɪ̯s]
CHOICE: [ɔɪ̯] = [tʃɔɪ̯s]
MOUTH: [ɑʊ̯] = [mɑʊ̯t̪] or [mɑʊ̯θ]
HAPPY: [i] = [ˈhɑp.i]
LETTER: [ɐ] or [ə] = [ˈlɛt.ɐ] or [ˈlɛt.ə]
HORSES: [ɪ] = [ˈho:sɪz]
COMMA: [ə] or [ɐ] = [ˈkɔm.ə] or [ˈkɔm.ɐ]
