= Dublin English =

Accents in the largest city of Ireland

- Native to: Republic of Ireland
- Region: Dublin
- Language family: Indo-European: Germanic; West Germanic; North Sea Germanic; Anglo-Frisian; Anglic; English; Hiberno-English; Dublin English
- Writing system: Latin (English alphabet)

Language codes
- ISO 639-3: –
- Glottolog: None

Dublin English is the collection of diverse varieties of Hiberno-English spoken in the metropolitan area of Dublin, the capital of Ireland. Modern-day Dublin English largely lies on a phonological continuum between two extremes (largely, a broad versus general accent distinction).

The more traditional, lower-prestige, working-class, local urban accent on the one end is known by linguist Raymond Hickey as local Dublin English. As of the 21st century, most speakers from Dublin and its suburbs have accent features falling variously along the entire middle as well as the newer end of the spectrum, which together form what Hickey calls non-local Dublin English, employed by the middle and upper class. On the extreme non-local end, a more recently developing, high-prestige, more widely regional (and even supraregional) accent exists, advanced Dublin English, only first emerging in the late 1980s and 1990s, now spoken by most Dubliners born in the 1990s or later. Advanced Dublin English is also spoken by the same age group all across Ireland (except the north) as it rapidly becomes a new national standard accent, in Hickey's estimation.

== Phonology ==
In the most general terms, all varieties of Dublin English have the following identifying sounds that are often distinct from the other regional accents of Ireland, pronouncing:

- FACE as a diphthong, [eɪ~ɛɪ], similar to British Received Pronunciation (RP) or General American (GA) accents.
- GOAT in the range (local to non-local) of [ʌʊ~oʊ~əʊ], similar to GA and RP.
- GOOSE as moderately or strongly fronted: [ʉu~ʉ~yʉ].
- PRICE starting as mid or slightly centralised: [əɪ~äɪ].
- MOUTH starting as fronted and/or raised: [æʊ~ɛʊ~eʊ].

All these sounds are also typical of a standard Irish English accent, which developed out of Dublin but now largely transcends regional boundaries among the middle and higher classes throughout the Republic.

== Local Dublin English ==
Local Dublin English (also, known by Hickey as popular Dublin English or conservative Dublin English) refers to a traditional, broad, working-class variety spoken in Dublin. It is the only Irish English variety that in earlier history was fully non-rhotic; however, as of the 21st century it is weakly rhotic, and among the various Dublin accents it uniquely has:

- CHOICE starting as low and unrounded, [ɑɪ], or rounded [ɒɪ].
- GOAT as widely diphthongal: [ʌʊ~ʌo].
- PRICE as very narrowly diphthongal, starting as mid and centralised: [əɪ].
- START as fronted and raised [æːɹˠ] or at its most extreme [ɛːɹˠ].
- THOUGHT as fully open: [ä(ː)]. This potentially merges with LOT, ä: the cot-caught merger.
- TRAP as near-open: [æ]. This same quality also defines BATH/DANCE, though this set tends to be lengthened.
- A lack of the foot-strut split, with [ʊ] used for both sets.
- A lack of the earn-urn merger among particularly conservative speakers: earn [ɛːɹˠ] or [əːɹˠ] versus urn [ʊːɹˠ].
- A traditional distinction between NORTH [ɑːɹˠ] and FORCE [ɔːɹˠ], thus avoiding a horse–hoarse merger.
- A traditional distinction between the consonants /w/ and /hw/, thus avoiding a witch–which merger.
- /θ/ and /ð/, respectively, as the stops [t(ʰ)] and [d].
- Intervocalic or word-final /t/ as dentalised [t̪], a glottal stop [ʔ], or [h].
- Certain vowels with "vowel breaking"; specifically, MOUTH, PRICE, GOOSE and FLEECE in closed syllables are "broken" into two syllables, approximating [ɛwə], [əjə], [uwə], and [ijə], respectively.
- Final cluster consonant reduction occurs, so /faɪnd/ as [fəɪn], and /fɜːrst/ as [fʊːɹs].

=== Notable speakers ===
- Damien Dempsey – "his distinctly Dublin sounds" and "a working class Dublin accent"
- Conor McGregor – "his famous Dublin accent"
- Becky Lynch – "her strong Dublin accent"
- Rhasidat Adeleke – "her Tallaght accent still clear"; "hearing her Tallaght accent in interviews has 'put Tallaght on the map'"

== Non-local Dublin English ==
=== Advanced Dublin English ===
Evolving as a fashionable outgrowth of non-local Dublin English, advanced Dublin English (also, new Dublin English and, formerly, fashionable Dublin English) is a relatively young variety that originally began in the early 1990s among the "avant-garde" and now those aspiring to a non-local "urban sophistication". Advanced Dublin English itself, first associated with affluent and middle-class inhabitants of southside Dublin, is probably now spoken by a majority of Dubliners born since the 1980s.

This "new mainstream" accent of Dublin's youth, rejecting traditional working-class Dublin, has:

- CHOICE as high as [ɔɪ] or even [oɪ].
- GOAT as narrowly diphthongal: [əʊ], similar to British Received Pronunciation.
- PRICE as starting more open than in local Dublin: [ɐɪ~ɑɪ], though the retracted variant has fallen out of fashion since the 1990s.
- START may be [ɑːɻ], with a backer vowel than in other Irish accents.
- TRAP as fully open: [a], perhaps even open central [ä]. This same quality also defines BATH/DANCE, though this set tends to be lengthened.
- THOUGHT as high as [ɔː~oː], thus avoiding a local Dublin-style cot-caught merger, since LOT remains low: [ɒ]. However, a new split is possible in advanced Dublin, where THOUGHT in a closed syllable is [oː] but in an open syllable is slightly more open [ɔː].
- The foot-strut split, with a STRUT vowel more open that the [ʊ] of local Dublin and possibly unrounded.
- A completed earn-urn merger, creating a unified NURSE set, which possibly expands to encompass a third set, SQUARE, since both SQUARE and NURSE are potentially rounded [øːɻ]: thus, a per-pair-purr merger.
- A collapse of NORTH and FORCE, leading to a horse–hoarse merger.
- A collapse of /w/ and /hw/, leading to a witch–which merger.
- Syllable-initial /t/ and /d/ possibly affricated, thus: [ts] and [dz].
- Word-final /l/ as possibly velarised: [ɫ].
- /r/ as a retroflex approximant, [ɻ], in contrast to most of Ireland, which traditionally has a slightly velarised approximant, [ɹˠ].

==== Dublin 4 English ====
Advanced Dublin English largely evolved out of an even more innovative and briefly-fashionable accent, Dublin 4 (or D4) English, which originated around the 1970s or 1980s from middle- or higher-class speakers in South Dublin before spreading outwards and then rapidly disappearing. Also known as DART-speak after the suburban Dublin commuter railway system, or, mockingly, Dortspeak, this accent rejected traditional, conservative, and working-class notions of Irishness, with its speakers instead regarding themselves as more trendy and sophisticated. However, particular aspects of the D4 accent became quickly noticed and ridiculed as sounding affected or elitist by the 1990s, causing its defining features to fall out of fashion within that decade. Still, it originated certain (less salient) other features that continue to be preserved in advanced Dublin English today. The salient defining features that are now out of fashion include pronouncing the BATH and START lexical sets with a back, long and rounded vowel, thus a glass in the bar like [ə glɒːs ɪn ðə bɒːɹ]. Other sounds, however, like the raising of LOT and THOUGHT to [ɒ~ɔ] and [ɔː~oː], respectively (whereas the two were traditionally merged and low in local Dublin English), have survived from D4 English into advanced Dublin English.

=== Mainstream Dublin English ===
The strict centre of the Dublin English continuum is mainstream Dublin English, spoken by the middle class, particularly in the 20th century. Mainstream Dublin English of the early- to mid-20th century was the direct basis for a standard accent of Ireland that is no longer regionally specific, fairly widespread everywhere except in the north of Ireland, where Ulster English persists. However, the majority of Dubliners born since the 1980s (led particularly by females) have shifted towards advanced Dublin English. Advanced Dublin English may be in the process of overtaking mainstream Dublin English as the national prestige variety.

Generally, the vowels of mainstream Dublin fall between the extremes of local Dublin and advanced Dublin accents; for instance, GOAT falls somewhere between the wider versus narrower diphthongs of these two accents. However, the low back vowels are of special note in mainstream Dublin, where CLOTH (in some analyses, a mere subset of LOT) is back, open, rounded, and short: [ɒ], while the vowel in THOUGHT/NORTH is back, open, rounded, and long, [ɒː]. Thus, THOUGHT/NORTH is possibly distinct from FORCE by height, from CLOTH by length, and from LOT by roundness, if at all. MOUTH is less raised than all other Dublin accents, thus: [aʊ]. Much variation exists for intervocalic /t/ (as in city or Italy), which can be the slit fricative [θ̠] common throughout Ireland, the glottal stop of local Dublin [ʔ], or a tap [ɾ] reminiscent of Ulster and North American English.

=== Notable speakers ===
- Saoirse Ronan – "the 'Dub' accent in which she speaks"
- Andrew Scott – "his soft-as-rain Dublin accent"
- Katie McGrath
- Samantha Mumba – described as having a "neutral Dublin" accent
- Orla Brady – "her Dublin accent undimmed from nearly 15 years in the States"
- Seana Kerslake
- Fionnula Flanagan
- Elaine Cassidy
- Sarah Bolger
- Angeline Ball
- Dominique McElligott
