= Abercraf English =

Dialect of Welsh English

- Native to: United Kingdom
- Region: Abercraf
- Language family: Indo-European: Germanic; West Germanic; Ingvaeonic; Anglic; English; British English; Welsh English; Abercraf English
- Writing system: Latin (English alphabet)

Language codes
- ISO 639-3: –
- Glottolog: None

Abercraf English (also known as Abercrave English) is a dialect of Welsh English, primarily spoken in the village of Abercraf located in the far south of Powys.

== Accent ==
Abercraf English is distinct from other accents in its county, such as the one spoken in Myddfai, due to separation by the Brecon Beacons, creating a substantial communication barrier between the two localities. It is more appropriate to associate it with neighbouring Swansea Valley, particularly the speech in northern areas (esp. Ystalyfera and Ystradgynlais) since they are more similar to Abercraf than ones in its county. This could be seen from a survey where speakers could not discern the origins of the speech of Ystradgynlais and their hometown, but were able to discern Cwmtwrch with other villages in the valley.

== History ==
Abercraf was entirely Welsh-speaking until World War II, when English-speaking evacuees settled in the village. It is a relatively young acquired dialect. This can be seen from generally less assimilation and elision and clear articulation unlike other accents in Powys or Swansea. As a more modern accent, it is restricted to the last two to three generations, with younger people being much more likely to speak it — though much of their daily life is conducted in Welsh, leading English to be taught as a second language.

== Phonology ==
=== Consonants ===
Like many other accents in Britain, Abercraf's consonants generally follow that of Received Pronunciation, although it does have some unique innovations common for South Wales dialects:

- As in Port Talbot, consonants can be geminated by any preceding vowel except long non-close vowels, and is most noticeable in fortis plosives and when they are in intervocalic positions.
- Strong aspiration for the voiceless plosives /p, t, k/ as [pʰʰ, tʰʰ, kʰʰ] in stressed syllables when in initial position.
- Regular G-dropping, where the suffix -ing is pronounced as /-ɪn/.
- /r/ is regularly a tapped [ɾ].
- Marginal loan consonants from Welsh /r̥, x, ɬ/ may be used for Welsh proper nouns and expressions, yet [r̥] is often heard in the discourse particle right.
- The -es morphemic suffix in words like goes, tomatoes is often voiceless /s/ instead of /z/ found elsewhere.
  - Like with Scottish English, the suffix -ths such as in baths, paths and mouths is rendered as /θs/ instead of /ðz/.
- H-dropping is quite common in informal speech, although /h/ is pronounced in emphatic speech and while reading word lists.
- /l/ is always clear, and likewise there is no vowel breaking.

=== Vowels ===
Abercraf English is non-rhotic; /r/ is only pronounced before a vowel. Like RP, linking and intrusive R is present in the system. On the other hand, the vowel system varies greatly from RP, unlike its consonants, which is stable in many English accents around the world.

==== Monophthongs ====
Monophthongs of Abercraf English, according to Tench (1990:135–136).

Monophthongs
	Front		Central		Back	
	short	long	short	long	short	long
Close	ɪ	iː			ʊ	uː
Close-mid		eː		ɜː		oː
Open-mid	ɛ	ɛː	ʌ			
Open	a			aː	ɒ	ɒː

- FLEECE and GOOSE are close to cardinal [iː] and [uː].
  - The HAPPY vowel is always tense, being analysed as the FLEECE vowel, where conservative RP has the lax [ɪ].
- NURSE is unrounded and mid [ɜ̝ː]. Unlike other accents in West Glamorgan which have a rounded [øː], Abercraf's realisation is identical to RP; a similar articulation had also been recorded in Myddfai.
- There is no phonemic distinction between STRUT and COMMA, with the merged vowel being realised as open-mid [ɜ] in stressed syllables and as mid [ə] when unstressed. It is transcribed as /ʌ/ because the stressed allophone is close to RP /ʌ/.
  - When unstressed and spelt with an ⟨e⟩, the DRESS vowel is preferred, such as cricket, fastest and movement. Likewise when spelt with ⟨a⟩, it varies from TRAP to STRUT.
- There is no horse–hoarse merger, with the first set pronounced as [ɒː], and the second [oː] respectively.
- Like all accents of Wales, the SQUARE–DRESS, PALM–TRAP and THOUGHT–LOT sets are based more on length rather than vowel quality; creating minimal pairs such as shared–shed, heart–hat and short–shot.
- The SQUARE–DRESS vowels are close to cardinal [ɛ].
- THOUGHT and LOT are close to cardinal [ɒ]. In the case of the former, its articulation is considerably more open than the corresponding RP vowel.
- Pairs PALM–TRAP are relatively centralised, although TRAP may approach to the front.
- The trap–bath split is completely absent in Abercraf English unlike other Welsh accents which have lexical exceptions.

==== Diphthongs ====
Diphthongs of Abercraf English, according to Tench (1990:135–136)

Diphthongs
		Endpoint	
		Front	Back
Start point	Close	ei	ɪu ou
Start point	Open	ai ɒi	au

The offsets of the fronting diphthongs are near-close [ɪ], whereas the offsets of the backing diphthongs are close [u].

- The CHOICE onset is closer to open mid [ɔ], despite its transcription as /ɒ/.
- There are no minimal pairs between PRICE words such as aye/I and Dai/Di, unlike in Port Talbot. Like in Myddfai, the onset of PRICE is more open [ɐ̟], compared to other Welsh accents such as West Glamorgan /ə/.
- MOUTH has a near-open onset [ɐ], sharing a similar vowel quality as Myddfai, which is also more open than /ə/ that of West Glamorgan.

Abercraf has kept some distinctions between diphthong–monophthong pronunciations; they are shared among other south Welsh dialects such as Port Talbot. These distinctions are lost in most other dialects and they include:

- When GOOSE is spelt with ⟨ew⟩, diphthongal /ɪu/ replaces monophthongal /uː/, thus blew/blue and threw/through are distinct.
- The sequence /juː/ is pronounced as /juː/ when ⟨y⟩ is represented in the spelling, otherwise /ɪu/, as in you/youth as opposed to use/ewe. When unstressed and after non-coronal consonants, /juː/ uses the FOOT vowel instead.
- Absence of toe–tow and pain–pane mergers, therefore there are distinct monophthongal and diphthongal pronunciations of FACE and GOAT lexical sets. They are diphthongs /ei/ and /ou/ when the spelling contains ⟨i⟩/⟨y⟩ and ⟨u⟩/⟨w⟩ respectively, otherwise they are monophthongs /eː/ and /oː/. A good illustration is that of the word play-place /ˈpleipleːs/.
  Monophthongal pronunciations /eː/ and /oː/ are both close-mid; they match their cardinal equivalents. The diphthongal pronunciations have less movement compared to other south Welsh accents, with the onsets of each evidently being close-mid. Exceptions to this rule also exist similar to Port Talbot English, but FACE is slightly different in Abercraf:
  - The monophthong is generally used before nasals and in the sequence ⟨-atiV⟩, therefore strange and patience is pronounced /eː/.
  - Certain minimal pairs that are not distinct in Port Talbot English, but are in Abercraf, such as waste/waist. In Port Talbot these two are pronounced monophthongally.
- NEAR and CURE are not centring diphthongs as in conservative RP or long monophthongs as in Standard Southern British, but rather a disyllabic vowel sequence consisting of the FLEECE and GOOSE vowels, respectively, as the first element, followed by the COMMA vowel, such that these words are pronounced [niː.ʌ] and [kɪu̯ː.ʌ] respectively.
- Like Port Talbot English, NEAR has a monosyllabic pronunciation /jøː/ word-initially, including after dropped /h/, making hear, here, year and ear all homophones. Likewise, heard also has this vowel.

=== Phonemic incidence ===
Abercraf English generally follows West Glamorgan lexical incidence patterns.

- The first syllable in area may use the FACE vowel instead of SQUARE.
- Only one syllable is in co-op, being homophonous to cop.
- Haulier has the TRAP vowel unlike other accents which have THOUGHT.
- Renowned was once pronounced with [ou], although this is a spelling pronunciation and standard [au] does exist.
- Unstressed to regularly has FOOT over COMMA even before consonants.
- Tooth has the FOOT vowel instead of GOOSE, which shares its pronunciation with the Midlands and Northern England.
- Want has the STRUT vowel, although this pronunciation was known among non-Welsh speakers of English.
- The vowel in whole uses GOOSE instead of the usual GOAT.

=== Assimilation and elision ===
As mentioned above, there is less assimilation and elision than in other accents, however some consonants can be elided:

- /n/ is assimilated as /m, ŋ/ in the appropriate environments as RP. Likewise, the /n/ in government is elided.
- Unlike other colloquial accents in Britain, elision alveolar plosives /t, d/ before consonants is not common. /t/ was elided in first job and next week but not in soft wood, on the other hand /d/ is rarely elided in binds and old boy and clearly rendered in could be, headmaster and standard one.
- /s/ is retracted to /ʃ/ before another /ʃ/ as in bus shelter but not before palatal /j/ in this year (see yod-coalescence).

The vowel /ə/ is not elided, thus factory, mandarin, reference always have three syllables, unlike many accents such as RP or even Port Talbot.

=== Intonation ===
Abercraf English is considered to have a 'sing-song' or 'lilting' intonation due to having high amount of pitch on an unstressed post-tonic syllable, as well as pre-tonic syllables having a great degree of freedom, with a continuous rising pitch being common.

== Bibliography ==
- Connolly, John H. (1990), "Port Talbot English", in Coupland, Nikolas; Thomas, Alan Richard (eds.), English in Wales: Diversity, Conflict, and Change, Multilingual Matters Ltd., pp. 121–129, ISBN 1-85359-032-0
- Tench, Paul (1990), "The Pronunciation of English in Abercrave", in Coupland, Nikolas; Thomas, Alan Richard (eds.), English in Wales: Diversity, Conflict, and Change, Multilingual Matters Ltd., pp. 130–140, ISBN 1-85359-032-0
- Wells, John C. (1982), Accents of English, Vol. 2: The British Isles (pp. i–xx, 279–466), Cambridge University Press, doi:10.1017/CBO9780511611759, ISBN 0-52128540-2
