= Broad and general accents =

"Thick" vs "neutral" ways of speaking

The distinction between broad and general accents is a socio-economic-linguistic contrast made between different accents of the same language, typically spoken in a single geographical location and perceived by the language users themselves:

- A broad accent (sometimes equated with a local or vernacular accent) is popularly perceived as very "strong" or "thick", highly recognizable to a particular population (typically within a particular region), and often linguistically conservative; almost always, it is the accent associated with the traditional speech of the local people or the working class (whether rural or urban) of a given region.
- A general accent (sometimes equated with a standard accent) is perceived as geographically more widespread, not particularized to a certain population or location, sounding more "neutral" or "weak", and historico-linguistically innovative; it is typically associated with the middle class of a given region, a growing process of standardization or supraregionalization that transcends local boundaries, or more "mainstream" speakers.

The capitalized term "broad" to refer to a dialect is commonly placed before a place name in the United Kingdom, such as "Broad Lancashire" or "Broad Yorkshire". The supposed mainstream English accent of the United States has been called "General American" since the early-mid 20th century.

Broad and general are not definitively established terms in phonology and phonetics, and thus other terms are commonly used to make the same basic distinction. Irish linguist Raymond Hickey, for example, has classified the broad traditional accent of Dublin as "local" and more general mainstream accents of Dublin collectively as "non-local". He has also referred to a particular general and non-local accent common throughout Ireland as "supraregional".

Sometimes a third category is also distinguished: a cultivated accent that is considered particularly cultured, stylish, affluent, or even contrived, associated with the educated upper class of a given region. All three distinctions (cultivated, general, and broad) are well studied varieties within South African, New Zealand, and Australian English phonology. The same three basic concepts also commonly characterize scholarly discussions of the dialects of southeastern England (particularly around London) in the 21st century—namely: Received Pronunciation (cultivated), Estuary English (general), and Cockney or Multicultural London English (broad).
