= Fragmentos =

Monument and Art Gallery by Doris Salcedo

Fragmentos, Espacio de Arte y Memoria
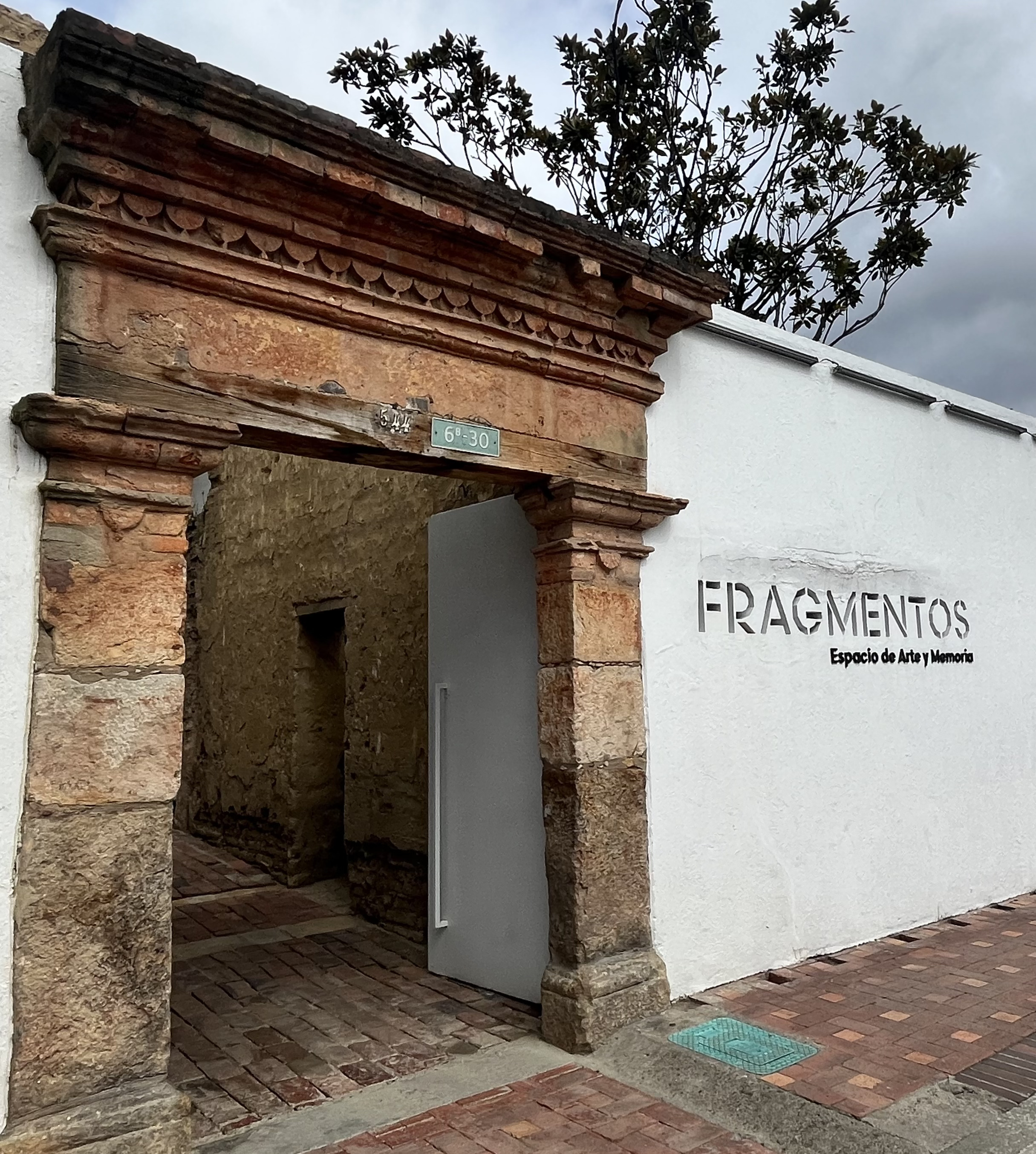
- Entrance to the Fragmentos art space and memorial
- Interactive fullscreen map
- Established: 2018; 8 years ago
- Location: Carrera 7 #6B-30; Bogotá
- Coordinates: 4°35′33″N 74°04′45″W
- Type: Site-specific art, art museum, and memorial
- Website: www.fragmentos.gov.co/Paginas/default.aspx

Fragmentos, Espacio de Arte y Memoria (2018) (Spanish for "Fragments, a Space for Art and Memory") is a site-specific art installation, art gallery, and memorial created by Colombian artist Doris Salcedo and architect Carlos Granada. The main focus of the installation is the 1,288 floor tiles that were made by melting down the firearms that were turned in by the now-defunct FARC guerrilla group after the signing of the Colombian peace agreement in 2016.

The art installation has been described by Salcedo as a "countermonument" and a space to reflect on the Colombian conflict. Salcedo has described that the installation as a countermonument as it does not pay tribute to any of the involved parties, does not intend to express beauty nor build a triumphalist narrative.

== Background ==
As part of the agreement between the Government of Colombia and the now-defunct FARC, both parties agreed to the creation of monuments using the firearms that were turned in by guerrilla group. One of the monuments, Kusikawsay by Mario Opazo, was agreed for the Headquarters of the United Nations in New York City and the other, Fragmentos, was established in Bogotá, Colombia's capital. Another monument was planned for Havana, the venue of the peace talks, however this one has not materialized.

Fragmentos was a result of an open competition where 28 individual artists, both Colombian and international, presented their proposals for the monument. The proposals were analyzed by an artistic committee and ultimately selected the proposal by Colombian artist Doris Salcedo.

== Description ==
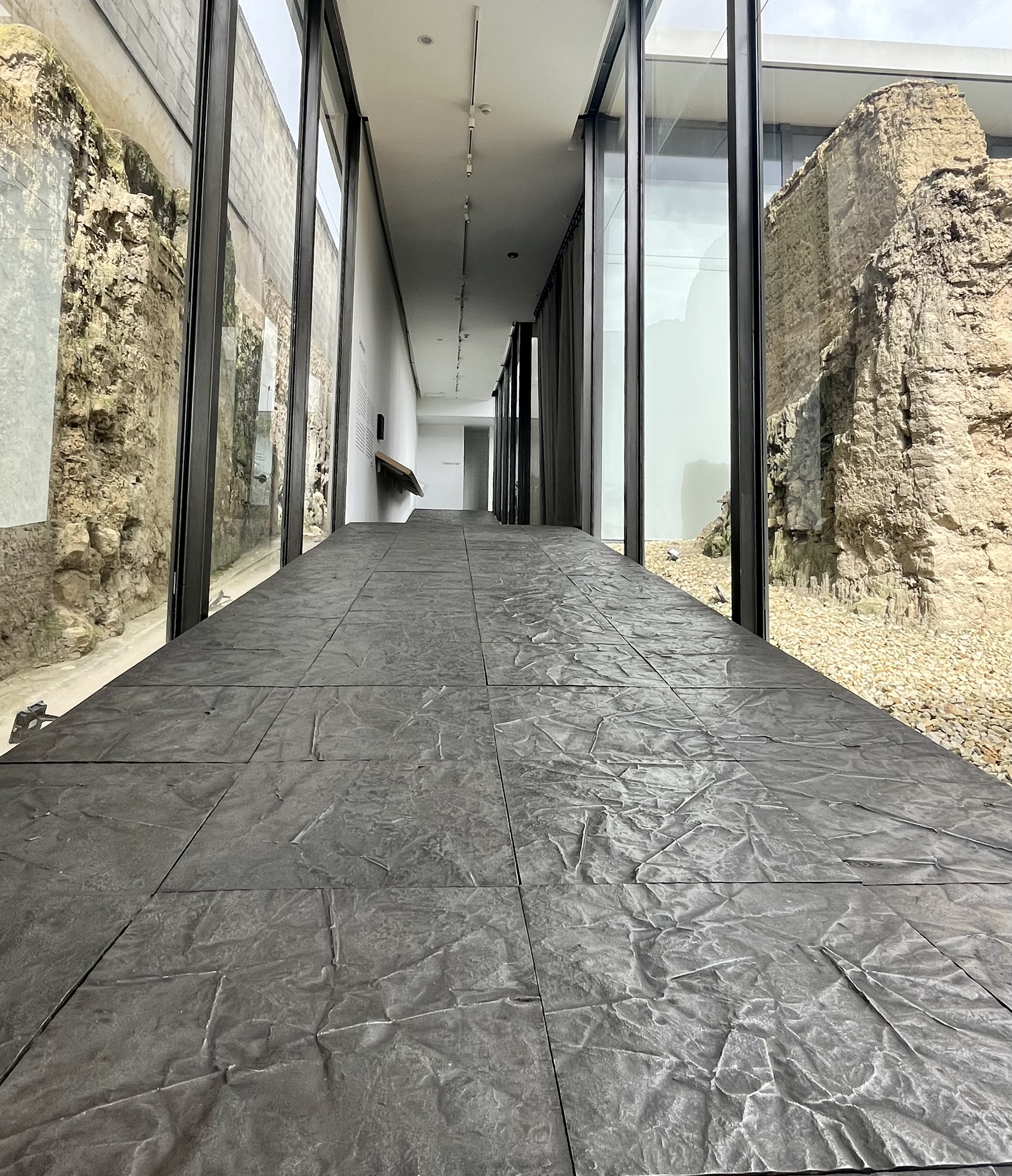
Close view of the floor tiles constructed from FARC firearms.

Housed amongst the ruins of a once abandoned colonial-era house in La Candelaria locality, of Bogotá, Colombia, Fragmentos is a memorial, art gallery, and a site-specific art installation whose main focus is the floor tiles that were made using the firearms that the FARC-EP guerrilla group rendered post the signing of the peace agreement with the Government of Colombia. The idea of using the firearms as floor tiles opposes the idea of glorifying violence, or monumentalizing weapons, and today is the physical and conceptual basis of this contermonument that inverts the power relationship that gave the rifles.

Fragmentos, initially presented as an empty space, is at the same time a space for the production and exhibition of other artistic works, in an annual program whose duration will be equivalent to the duration of the conflict between the parties.

The title Fragmentos is derived from the idea that society has fragments of memories from the armed conflict in Colombia that all-together compose a single narrative of the conflict.

== Construction ==
The firearms that were collected by the United Nations Verification Mission in Colombia (UNVIC) and the Police Unit for Peace Building (UNIPEP) were transferred to INDUMIL, a Colombian state-run arms manufacturer, where they were melted down into various molds that Salcedo had worked on with the assistance of 20 women who were all survivors of sexual violence incurred during the Colombian conflict.

From the 8,994 individual firearms that were collected, INDUMIL was able to subtract 37 tons of molted steel which resulted in 1,288 floor tiles for the installation, each of approximately 60 x 60 cm, 6mm thick, and weighing approximately 40 kilograms.

== Exhibitions ==
Francisco Goya exhibition at Fragmentos

From its foundation, Fragmentos was intended to become a venue for current and future generations of artists to exhibit their interpretations of armed conflict and, through them, allow for the construction of a collective vision of the future that encourage difficult, provocative, and reflective dialogues.

=== Selected exhibitions ===
- 26 November 2020 – 30 May 2021: Salam Tristesse, Irak, 2016-2020 by Francis Alÿs
- 15 September 2022 – 21 May 2023: Bruma by Beatriz Gonzalez
- 17 August 2023 – 26 November 2023: Arrancar los ojos by Gabriela Golder
- 13 April 2024 – 28 July 2024: Desminar by Tania Candiani
- 5 September 2026 – 17 January 2027: Los Desastres de la Guerra by Francisco Goya

== Ownership and management ==
The Government of Colombia, through its Ministry of Culture, sponsored and owns Fragmentos. The National Museum of Colombia, a dependency of the Ministry of Culture, directly manages the gallery and its exhibitions.

== Gallery ==
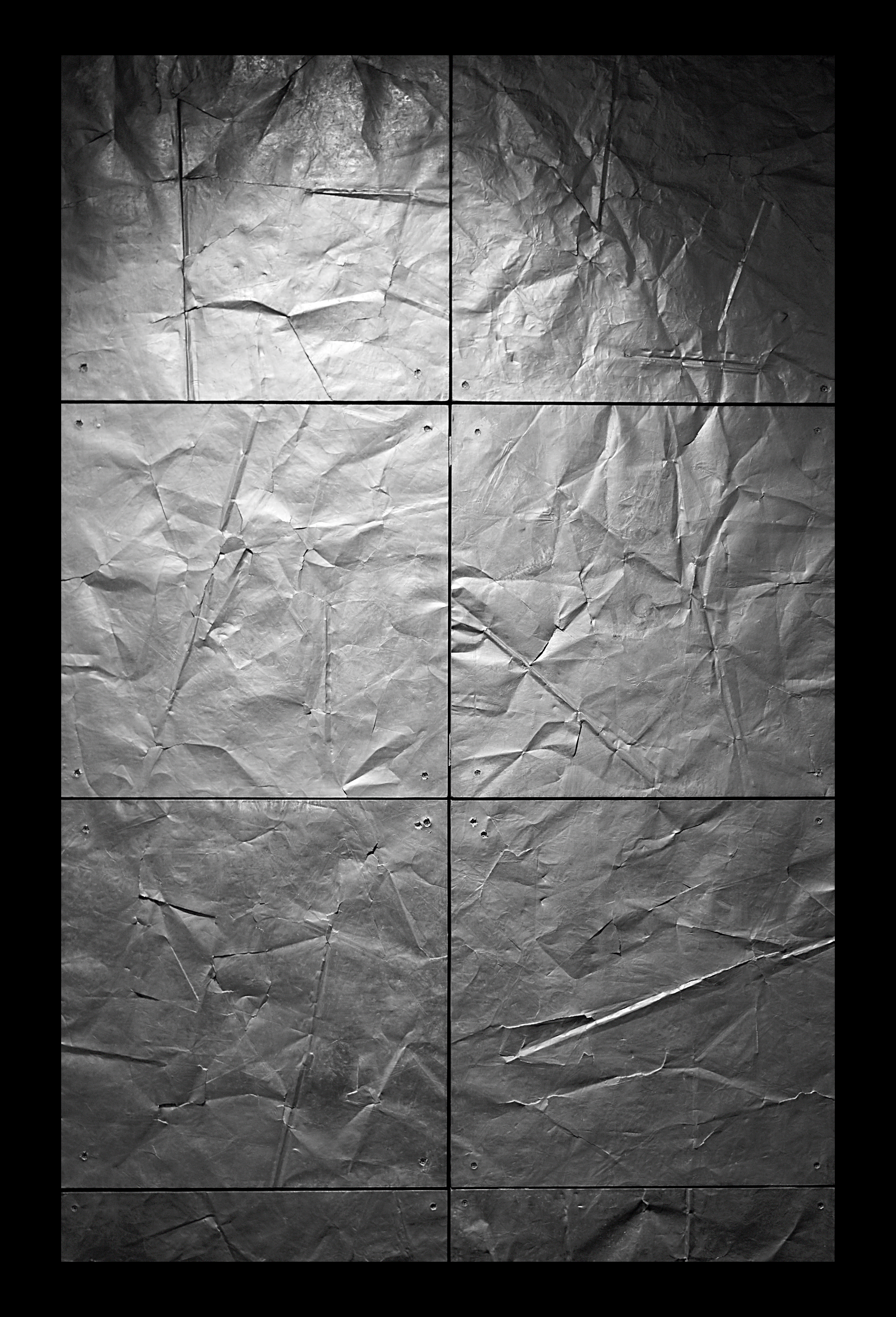
Close up view of the floor tiles made from FARC firearms

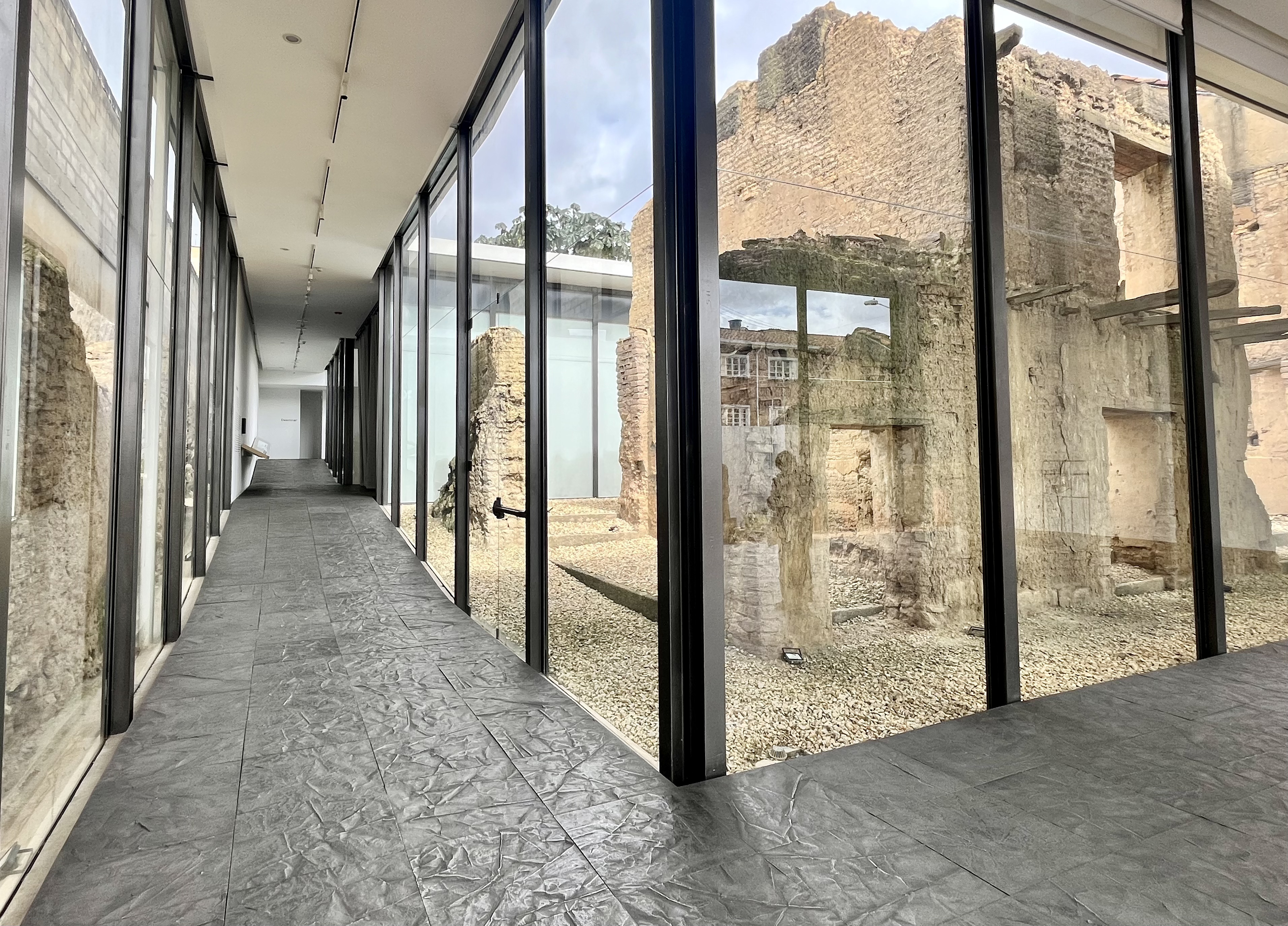
View of the surrounding ruins

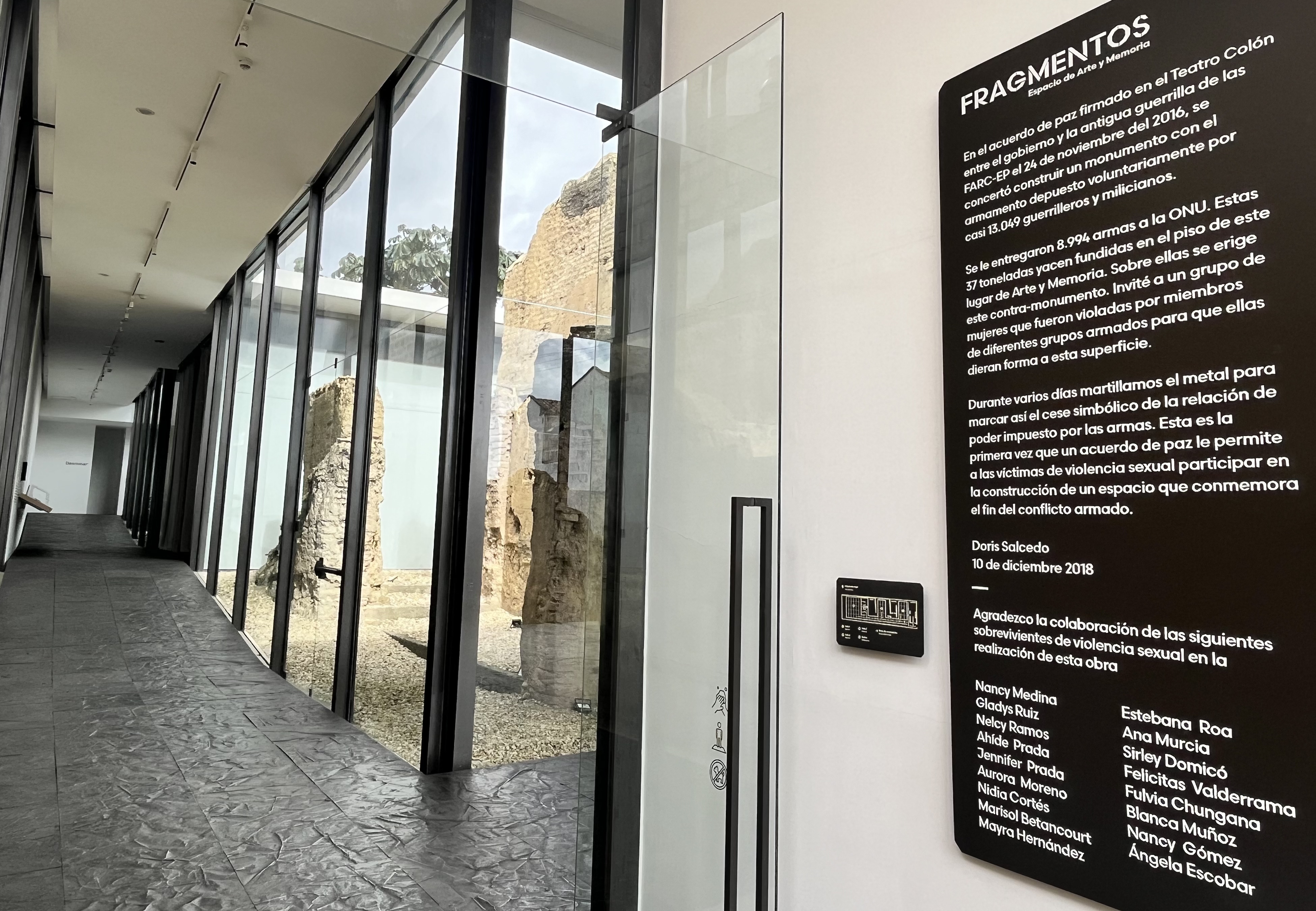

One of the gardens located within the exhibition space

== See also ==
- La paloma de la paz, a sculpture by Fernando Botero created in response to the Colombian peace process.
