= Early Modern English =

Stage of development of English, starting late 15th century

- Shakespeare's English, Shakespearean English, King James' English
- English
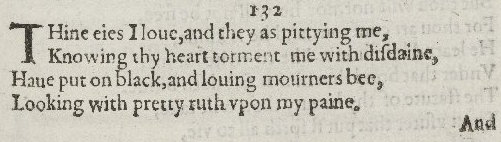
- William Shakespeare's Sonnet 132 in the 1609 Quarto
- Native to: England, Wales, Scotland, Ireland and English overseas possessions
- Era: Early modern period; developed into Modern English in the late 17th century
- Language family: Indo-European: Germanic; West Germanic; North Sea Germanic; Anglo-Frisian; Anglic; Early Modern English
- Early forms: Proto-Indo-European: Proto-Germanic; Proto-West Germanic; Proto-English; Old English; Middle English

Language codes
- ISO 639-3: –
- ISO 639-6: emen
- Glottolog: None
- IETF: en-emodeng

Early Modern English (sometimes abbreviated EModE or EMnE), also known as Early New English (ENE), and colloquially Shakespeare's English, Shakespearean English, or King James' English, is the stage of the English language from the beginning of the Tudor period to the English Interregnum and Restoration, or from the transition from Middle English, in the late 15th century, to the transition to Modern English, in the mid-to-late 17th century.

Before and after the accession of James I to the English throne in 1603, the emerging English standard began to influence the spoken and written Middle Scots of Scotland.

The grammatical and orthographical conventions of literary English in the late 16th century and the 17th century are still very influential on modern Standard English. The majority of modern readers of English can understand texts written in the late phase of Early Modern English, such as the King James Bible and the works of William Shakespeare, and they have greatly influenced Modern English.

Texts from the earlier phase of Early Modern English, such as the late-15th-century Le Morte d'Arthur (1485) and the mid-16th-century Gorboduc (1561), may present more difficulties but are still closer to Modern English grammar, lexicon and phonology than are 14th-century Middle English texts, such as the works of Geoffrey Chaucer.

Page of Psalm 23 from the original 1611 King James Bible

== History ==
=== English Renaissance ===
==== Transition from Middle English ====
The change from Middle English to Early Modern English affected much more than just vocabulary and pronunciation.

Middle English underwent significant change over time and contained large dialectical variations. Early Modern English, on the other hand, became more standardised and developed an established canon of literature that survives today.

- 1476 – William Caxton started printing in Westminster; however, the language that he used reflected the variety of styles and dialects used by the authors who originally wrote the material.

===== Tudor period (1485–1603) =====
- 1485 – Caxton published Thomas Malory's Le Morte d'Arthur, the first print bestseller in English. Malory's language is often described as late Middle English, but it also shows transitional Early Modern features, including the beginnings of the Great Vowel Shift.
- 1491 or 1492 – Richard Pynson started printing in London; his style tended to prefer Chancery Standard, the form of English used by the government.

==== Henry VIII ====
- c. 1509 – Pynson became the king's official printer.
- From 1525 – Publication of William Tyndale's Bible translation, which was initially banned.
- 1539 – Publication of the Great Bible, the first officially authorised Bible in English. Edited by Myles Coverdale, it was largely from the work of Tyndale. It was read to congregations regularly in churches, which familiarised much of the population of England with a standard form of the language.
- 1549 – Publication of the first edition of the Book of Common Prayer in English, under the supervision of Thomas Cranmer (revised in 1552, 1559, 1604, and 1662), which standardised much of the wording of church services. Some have argued that since attendance at prayer book services was required by law for many years, the repetitive use of its language helped to standardise Modern English even more than the King James Bible (1611) did.
- 1557 – Publication of Tottel's Miscellany.

==== Elizabethan English ====
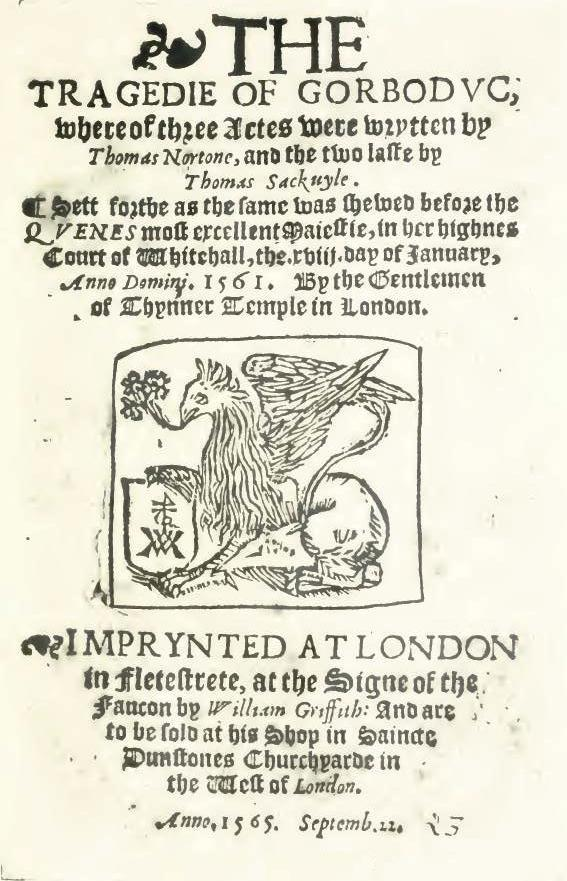
Title page of Gorboduc (printed 1565). The Tragedie of Gorbodvc, whereof three Actes were wrytten by Thomas Nortone, and the two laste by Thomas Sackuyle. Sett forthe as the same was shewed before the Qvenes most excellent Maiestie, in her highnes Court of Whitehall, the .xviii. day of January, Anno Domini .1561. By the Gentlemen of Thynner Temple in London.

Elizabethan era (1558–1603)

- 1560 – The Geneva Bible was published. The New Testament was completed in 1557 by English Reformed exiles on the continent during the reign of Mary, and the complete Bible three years later, after Elizabeth succeeded the throne. This version was favoured by the Puritans and Pilgrims due to its more vigorous and forceful language. Its popularity and proliferation (due in large part to its copious notes) over the following decades sparked the production of the King James Bible to counter it.
- 1582 – The Rheims and Douai Bible was completed, and the New Testament was released in Rheims, France, in 1582. It was the first complete English translation of the Bible that was officially sponsored and carried out by the Catholic Church (earlier translations into English, especially of the Psalms and Gospels, existed as far back as the 9th century, but it was the first Catholic English translation of the full Bible). Though the Old Testament was already complete, it was not published until 1609–1610, when it was released in two volumes. While it did not make a large impact on the English language at large, it certainly played a role in the development of English, especially in heavily Catholic English-speaking areas.
- Christopher Marlowe, fl. 1586–1593
- 1592 – The Spanish Tragedy by Thomas Kyd
- c. 1590 – c. 1612 – Shakespeare's plays written

=== 17th century ===
==== Jacobean and Caroline eras ====
===== Jacobean era (1603–1625) =====
- 1609 – Shakespeare's sonnets published
- Other playwrights:
  - Ben Jonson
  - Thomas Dekker
  - Beaumont and Fletcher (Francis Beaumont and John Fletcher)
  - John Webster
- 1607 – The first successful permanent English colony in the New World, Jamestown, is established in Virginia. Early vocabulary specific to American English comes from indigenous languages (such as moose, racoon).
- 1611 – The King James Version of the Bible was published. It was largely based on the Bishops' Bible translation and revision of 1602. The "Authorised Version" as it is called in the U.K. remained the standard Bible in the Church of England until the 1769 Oxford edition supplanted it with updated modern English spelling and grammar.
- 1623 – Shakespeare's First Folio published

===== Caroline era and English Civil War (1625–1649) =====
- 1630–1651 – William Bradford, Governor of Plymouth Colony, wrote his journal. It will become Of Plymouth Plantation, one of the earliest texts written in the American Colonies.
- 1647 – Publication of the first Beaumont and Fletcher folio

==== Interregnum and Restoration ====
The English Civil War and the Interregnum were times of social and political upheaval and instability. The dates for Restoration literature are a matter of convention and differ markedly from genre to genre. In drama, the "Restoration" may last until 1700, but in poetry, it may last only until 1666, the annus mirabilis (year of wonders), and in prose lasts until 1688. With the increasing tensions over succession and the corresponding rise in journalism and periodicals, or until possibly 1700, when those periodicals grew more stabilised.

- 1651 – Publication of Leviathan by Thomas Hobbes.
- 1660–1669 – Samuel Pepys wrote his diary, which will become an important eyewitness account of the Restoration Era.
- 1662 – New edition of the Book of Common Prayer, largely based on the 1549 and subsequent editions. It long remained a standard work in English.
- 1667 – Publication of Paradise Lost by John Milton and of Annus Mirabilis by John Dryden.

=== Development to Modern English ===
The 17th-century port towns and their forms of speech gained influence over the old county towns. From around the 1690s onwards, England experienced a new period of internal peace and relative stability, which encouraged the arts, including literature. Modern English can be taken to have emerged fully by the beginning of the Georgian era in 1714, but English orthography remained somewhat fluid until the publication of Johnson's A Dictionary of the English Language, in 1755.

The Proceedings in Courts of Justice Act 1730 made English, instead of Law French and Latin, the obligatory language for use in the courts of England and in the court of exchequer in Scotland. It was later extended to Wales, and seven years later a similar act was passed in Ireland, the Administration of Justice (Language) Act (Ireland) 1737.

The towering importance of William Shakespeare over the other Elizabethan authors was the result of his reception during the 17th and the 18th centuries, which directly contributes to the development of Standard English. Shakespeare's plays are therefore still familiar and comprehensible 400 years after they were written, but the works of Geoffrey Chaucer and William Langland, which had been written only 200 years earlier, are considerably more difficult for the average modern reader.

== Orthography ==
Shakespeare's writings are universally associated with Early Modern English.

The orthography of Early Modern English is recognisably similar to that of today, but spelling was unstable. Early Modern and Modern English both retain various orthographical conventions that predate the Great Vowel Shift.

Early Modern English spelling was broadly similar to that encountered in Middle English. Some of the changes that occurred were based on etymology (as with the silent ⟨b⟩ that was added to words like debt, doubt and subtle). Many spellings had still not been standardised. For example, he was spelled as both he and hee in the same sentence in Shakespeare's plays and elsewhere.

Certain key orthographic features of Early Modern English spelling have not been retained:

- The letter ⟨S⟩ had two distinct lowercase forms: ⟨s⟩ (short s), as is still used today, and ⟨ſ⟩ (long s). The short s was always used at the end of a word and often elsewhere. The long s, if used, could appear anywhere except at the end of a word. The double lowercase S was written variously ⟨ſſ⟩, ⟨ſs⟩ or ⟨ß⟩ (the last ligature is still used in German ß); similar to the alternation between medial (σ) and final lowercase sigma (ς) in Greek.
- ⟨u⟩ and ⟨v⟩ were not considered two distinct letters then but as still different forms of the same letter. Typographically, ⟨v⟩ was frequent at the start of a word and ⟨u⟩ elsewhere: hence vnmoued (for modern unmoved) and loue (for love). The modern convention of using ⟨u⟩ for the vowel sounds and ⟨v⟩ for the consonant appears to have been introduced in the 1630s. Also, ⟨w⟩ was frequently represented by ⟨vv⟩.
- Similarly, ⟨i⟩ and ⟨j⟩ were also still considered not as two distinct letters, but as different forms of the same letter: hence ioy for joy and iust for just. Again, the custom of using ⟨i⟩ as a vowel and ⟨j⟩ as a consonant began in the 1630s.
- The letter ⟨þ⟩ (thorn) was still in use during the Early Modern English period but was increasingly limited to handwritten texts. In Early Modern English printing, ⟨þ⟩ was represented by the Latin ⟨Y⟩ (see Ye olde), which appeared similar to thorn in blackletter typeface ⟨𝖞⟩. Thorn had become nearly totally disused by the late Early Modern English period, the last vestiges of the letter being its ligatures, y^{e} (thee), y^{t} (that), y^{u} (thou), which were still seen occasionally in the 1611 King James Version and in Shakespeare's Folios.
- A silent ⟨e⟩ was often appended to words, as in ſpeake and cowarde. The last consonant was sometimes doubled when the ⟨e⟩ was added: hence manne (for man) and runne (for run).
- The sound that became Modern English /ʌ/ was often written ⟨o⟩ (as in son): hence ſommer, plombe (for modern summer, plumb).
- The final syllable of words like public was variously spelt but came to be standardised as -ick. The modern spellings with -ic did not come into use until the mid-18th century.
- ⟨y⟩ was often used instead of ⟨i⟩ and occasionally instead of ⟨j⟩ (see William Shakespeare's sonnet 19 in the Thomas Thorpe quarto; "Tyger's yawes").
- The vowels represented by ⟨ee⟩ and ⟨e_e⟩ (for example in meet and mete) changed, and ⟨ea⟩ became an alternative.

== Phonology ==
The phonology of Early Modern English is reconstructed from a variety of sources, including phonetic descriptions by orthoepists, spellings, and usage in poetry.

=== Consonants ===
Early Modern English consonants
		Labial	Dental	Alveolar	Palatal (-alveolar)	Velar	Glottal
Nasal		m		n		(ŋ)	
Plosive/ Affricate	voiceless	p		t	tʃ	k	
Plosive/ Affricate	voiced	b		d	dʒ	ɡ	
Fricative	voiceless	f	θ	s	ʃ	x ~ h	
Fricative	voiced	v	ð	z	(ʒ)		
Sonorant	median			r	j	w	
Sonorant	lateral			l			

Most consonant sounds of early modern English have survived into present-day English; however, there are still a few notable differences in pronunciation:

- Many initial consonant clusters which have disappeared in the modern day were still fully pronounced. These include /wr kn ɡn hw/. All but /hw/ had fully reduced in the 16th and 17th centuries.
  - /wr/ as in write was the first to disappear, merging into /r/ in the first half of the 17th century.
  - /kn/ as in knife evolved into a variety of pronunciations including [kn, tn, n̥(n)], some of which remained into the 18th century until it merged with /n/.
  - Similarly, /ɡn/ as in gnat evolved into [ŋn] or merged into /kn/ or /n/.
  - /hw/, spelled ⟨wh⟩ such as in what, where and whale, were still pronounced [ʍ], rather than [w]. That means, for example, that wine and whine were still pronounced differently, unlike in most varieties of English today. A merger into /w/ had started by 1700, but did not become common until the late 18th century.
- Much variation existed in words with postvocalic /x/, like night, thought, and daughter, written ⟨gh⟩. In Middle English, this phoneme had allophones [x~ç]. While [ç] dropped entirely via [h], [x] either dropped via the same path or became [f]. The most conservative dialects retained the original allophones until the 1630s, but gh-dropping dialects had already started appearing in Middle English. Between the 16th and 17th centuries, /h/ became the dominant form of the phoneme.
- Would and should had started losing /l/ in weak forms by the 1640s, but may have persisted several decades longer in the British American colonies. While the ⟨l⟩ in could is unetymological, having descended from Old English cūþe, both its spelling and its pronunciation were affected by analogy with would and should, showing /l/ in its strong forms.
- The modern phoneme /ʒ/ was not documented as occurring until the mid-17th century, when it formed from coalescence of the sequence /zj/. The word vision was pronounced [ˈvɪzjən] prior to the change.
- Early Modern English was rhotic, as postvocalic /r/ was not lost until the late 1700s. It was a trill [r] or tap [ɾ] word-initially and an approximant [ɹ] finally, but Dobson and Lass disagree on which was the intervocalic allophone based on different sources.
- In Early Modern English, the precise nature of the light and dark variants of the l consonant, respectively [l] and [ɫ], remains unclear.
- Word-final ⟨ng⟩, as in sing, was still pronounced [ŋɡ] until the late 16th century, when it began to coalesce into the usual modern pronunciation, [ŋ]. Coalescence happened at morpheme boundaries in the 17th century, except in inflected adjectives, giving modern singer /sɪŋər/ and stronger /strɒŋɡər/. However, coalescence happened earlier in unstressed -ing and the nasal further changed to /n/, becoming more and more common until the end of the 17th century. The original pronunciation [ŋɡ] is preserved in parts of England, in dialects such as Brummie, Mancunian and Scouse.
- H-dropping at the start of words was common. In loanwords taken from Latin, Greek, or any Romance language, a written h was increasingly pronounced from the 17th to 18th centuries, e.g. in humble, host, and British herb.

=== Vowels ===
Monophthongs
	Front		Back	
	Short	Long	Short	Long
Close	ɪ	iː	ʊ	uː
Mid	e ~ ɛ	eː ~ ɛː	ɔ ~ ɒ	oː
Open	æ ~ a		ɔ ~ ɒ	

Diphthongs (Note: The difference between the practice of transcribing EModE diphthong offsets with ⟨j w⟩ as opposed to the usual modern English ⟨ɪ̯ ʊ̯⟩ is not meaningful in any way. The precise EModE realizations are not known, and they vary even in modern English.)
	Front	Central		Back	
	Backing		Fronting		Backing
Close	iw			uj	
Mid	ew	əw	əj	ɔj	
Open	aw				ɔw

The following information partially comes from studies of the Great Vowel Shift alongside studies of Early Modern English.

- The modern English phoneme /aɪ/, as in glide, rhyme and eye, was [əj], and was reduced word-finally. Early Modern rhymes indicate that [əj] was similar to the vowel that was used at the end of words like happy, melody and busy.
- /aʊ/, as in now, out and ploughed, was [əw].
- /ɛ/, as in fed, elm and hen, was more or less the same as the phoneme represents today, sometimes approaching [ɪ] (which is still in the word pretty).
- /eɪ/, as in name, case and sake, was a long monophthong. It shifted from [æː] to [ɛː] and finally to [eː]. Earlier in Early Modern English, mat and mate were near-homophones, with a longer vowel in the second word. Thus, Shakespeare rhymed words like haste, taste and waste with last and shade with sad. The more open pronunciation remains in some Northern England English and rarely in Irish English. During the 17th century, the phoneme variably merged with the phoneme [ɛj] as in day, weigh, and the merger survived into standard forms of Modern English, though a few dialects kept these vowels distinct at least to the 20th century (see pane–pain merger).
- /iː/ (typically spelled ⟨ee⟩ or ⟨ie⟩) as in see, bee and meet, was more or less the same as the phoneme represents today, but it had not yet merged with the phoneme represented by the spellings ⟨ea⟩ or ⟨ei⟩ (and perhaps ⟨ie⟩, particularly with fiend, field and friend), as in east, meal and feat, which were pronounced with [eː] or [ɛ̝ː]. However, words like breath, dead and head may have already split off towards /ɛ/).
- /ɪ/, as in bib, pin and thick, was more or less the same as the phoneme represents today.
- /oʊ/, as in stone, bode and yolk, was [oː] or [o̞ː]. The phoneme was probably just beginning the process of merging with the phoneme [ow], as in grow, know and mow, without yet achieving today's complete merger. The old pronunciation remains in some dialects, such as in Yorkshire, East Anglia, and Scotland.
- /ɒ/, as in rod, top and pot, was [ɒ] or [ɔ], much like the corresponding RP sound.
- /ɔː/, as in taut, taught and law was more open than in Standard Southern British, being [ɔː] or [ɑː] (and thus being closer to Welsh and General American /ɔː/)
- /ɔɪ/, as in boy, choice and toy, is even less clear than other vowels. In the late 16th century, the similar but distinct phonemes /ɔj/, /uj/ and /əj/ all existed. By the late 17th century, they all merged. Because those phonemes were in such a state of flux during the whole early modern period (with evidence of rhyming occurring among them as well as with the precursor to /aɪ/), scholars often assume only the most neutral possibility for the pronunciation of /ɔɪ/ as well as its similar phonemes in Early Modern English: [əj] (which, if accurate, would constitute an early instance of the line–loin merger since /aɪ/ had not yet fully developed in English).
- /ʌ/ (as in drum, enough and love) and /ʊ/ (as in could, full, put) had not yet split and so were both pronounced in the vicinity of [ʊ].
- /uː/ occurred not only in words like food, moon and stool, but also all other words spelled with ⟨oo⟩ like blood, cook and foot. However, the vowel for some of those words was shortened at an early stage: either beginning or already in the process of approximating the Early Modern English [ʊ]. That phonological split among the ⟨oo⟩ words was a catalyst for the later foot–strut split and is called "early shortening" by John C. Wells. The ⟨oo⟩ words that came to be pronounced with the shortened vowel [ʊ] included, for example, good and blood. They, like other words with /ʊ/, were subsequently subject to the foot–strut split and many of them, like drum and love, came to be pronounced with the vowel [ɤ] and eventually /ʌ/. However, the words with a shortened vowel also seem to have included, at least in some pronunciations such as Shakespeare's and at certain stages, some words that are pronounced with the original non-shortened vowel /uː/ in Present-Day English - e.g. brood, doom and noon. For example, doom and come rhyme in Shakespeare's writing for this reason.
- /iw/ (Note: Dobson (1968) and other scholars before him postulated the existence of a vowel /y/ beside /iw/ in EModE, but some more modern studies such as Cercignani (2022) disagree.) occurred in words spelled with ew or ue such as due and dew. In most dialects of Modern English, it became either /juː/, or /uː/ with yod-dropping so that do, dew and due are now perfect homophones in most American pronunciations, but a distinction between the two phonemes remains in other dialects of English that did not yod-drop. There is an additional complication in dialects with yod-coalescence (such as Australian English and younger RP) where the /j/ portion of /juː/ merges with preceding consonants, resulting in dew and due /dʒuː/ (homophonous with Jew) being distinguished from do /duː/ by the initial consonant, without any vowel distinction.

=== Rhoticity ===
The r sound (the phoneme /r/) was probably always pronounced following vowel sounds, as in modern General American, West Country English, Irish English, and Scottish English.

At the beginning of the Early Modern English period there were three non-open and non-schwa short vowels before /r/ in the syllable coda: /e/, /i/ and /u/ (roughly equivalent to modern /ɛ/, /ɪ/ and /ʊ/; /ʌ/ had not yet developed). In London English they gradually merged into a phoneme that became modern /ɜːr/, known as the NURSE mergers. While ⟨ur⟩ spellings for ⟨ir⟩ words exist in the 1500s, these are descended from Old English words with the segments /yr/ and /ri/ suggesting that they may not be part of the merger. The earliest native speaker to comment on mergers between the classes is John Wallis in 1653, showing a near merger of /ur/ and /ir/, with "turn" and "burn" having the vowel of "dull", and "virtue" with a slightly closer or unrounded vowel. However, a smaller number of speakers merge /ir/ and /er/ instead. The full three-way NURSE mergers only completed in England around 1800.

=== Specific words ===
Yes and yet were pronounced approximately as [jɪs] and [jɪt]. Nature was pronounced approximately as [ˈnɛːtəɹ] and may have rhymed with letter or, early on, even latter. One may have been pronounced own, with both one and other using the era's long GOAT vowel, rather than today's STRUT vowels. Canonized, advertized and gallantry has different stress patterns and Ulysses probably rhymed with says. Tongue derived from the sound of tong and rhymed with song.

== Grammar ==
=== Pronouns ===
Early Modern English had two second-person personal pronouns: thou, the informal singular pronoun, and ye, the plural (both formal and informal) pronoun and the formal singular pronoun.

"Thou" and "ye" were both common in the early 16th century (they can be seen, for example, in the disputes over Tyndale's translation of the Bible in the 1520s and the 1530s) but by 1650, "thou" seems old-fashioned or literary. It has effectively completely disappeared from Modern Standard English.

The translators of the King James Version of the Bible (begun 1604 and published 1611, while Shakespeare was at the height of his popularity) had a particular reason for keeping the informal "thou/thee/thy/thine/thyself" forms that were slowly beginning to fall out of spoken use, as it enabled them to match the Hebrew and Ancient Greek distinction between second person singular ("thou") and plural ("ye"). It was not to denote reverence but only to denote the singular (in the King James Version, God addresses individual people and even Satan as "thou"). Over the centuries, however, the very fact that "thou" was dropping out of normal use gave it a special aura and so it gradually and ironically came to be used to express reverence in hymns and in prayers.

Like other personal pronouns, thou and ye have different forms dependent on their grammatical case; specifically, the objective form of thou is thee, its possessive forms are thy and thine, and its reflexive or emphatic form is thyself. The objective form of ye was you, its possessive forms are your and yours and its reflexive or emphatic forms are yourself and yourselves. The older forms "mine" and "thine" had become "my" and "thy" before words beginning with a consonant other than h, and "mine" and "thine" were retained before words beginning with a vowel or an h, as in mine eyes or thine hand.

Personal pronouns in Early Modern English
		Nominative	Oblique	Genitive	Possessive	Reflexive
1st person	singular	I	me	my/mine (Note: The genitives my, mine, thy, and thine are used as possessive adjectives before a noun, or as possessive pronouns without a noun. All four forms are used as possessive adjectives: mine and thine are used before nouns beginning in a vowel sound, or before nouns beginning in the letter h, which was usually silent (e.g. thine eyes and mine heart, which was pronounced as mine art) and my and thy before consonants (thy mother, my love). However, only mine and thine are used as possessive pronouns, as in it is thine and they were mine (not *they were my).)	mine	my selfe
1st person	plural	we	us	our	ours	our selves
2nd person	singular informal	thou	thee	thy/thine	thine	thy selfe
2nd person	plural informal	ye (Note: Ye had fallen out of use by c. 1600, being replaced by the original oblique you.)	you	your	yours	your selves
2nd person	formal	ye	you	your	yours	your selves
3rd person	singular	he/she/it	him/her/it	his/her/its (Note: From the early Early Modern English period up until the 17th century, its was the possessive of the third-person neuter it as well as of the third-person masculine it. Genitive it appears once in the 1611 King James Bible (Leviticus 25:5) as groweth of it owne accord.)	his/hers/its	himselfe/her selfe/it selfe
3rd person	plural	they	them	their	theirs	themselves

=== Verbs ===
==== Tense and number ====
During the early modern period, the verb inflections became simplified as they evolved towards their modern forms:

- The third-person singular present lost its alternate inflections: -eth and -th became obsolete, and -s survived. (Both forms can be seen together in Shakespeare: "With her, that hateth thee and hates us all".)
- The plural present form became uninflected. Present plurals had been marked with -en and singulars with -th or -s (-th and -s survived the longest, especially with the singular use of is, hath and doth). Marked present plurals were rare throughout the early modern period and -en was probably used only as a stylistic affectation to indicate rural or old-fashioned speech.
- The second-person singular indicative was marked in both the present and past tenses with -st or -est (for example, in the past tense, walkedst or gav'st). Since the indicative past was not and still is not otherwise marked for person or number, the loss of thou made the past subjunctive indistinguishable from the indicative past for all verbs except to be.

==== Modal auxiliaries ====
The modal auxiliaries cemented their distinctive syntactical characteristics during the early modern period. Thus, the use of modals without an infinitive became rare (as in "I must to Coventry"; "I'll none of that"). The use of modals' present participles to indicate aspect (as in "Maeyinge suffer no more the loue & deathe of Aurelio" from 1556), and of their preterite forms to indicate tense (as in "he follow'd Horace so very close, that of necessity he must fall with him") also became uncommon.

Some verbs ceased to function as modals during the early modern period. The present form of must, mote, became obsolete. Dare also lost the syntactical characteristics of a modal auxiliary and evolved a new past form (dared), distinct from the modal durst.

==== Perfect and progressive forms ====
The perfect of the verbs had not yet been standardised to use only the auxiliary verb "to have". Some took as their auxiliary verb "to be", such as this example from the King James Version: "But which of you... will say unto him... when he is come from the field, Go and sit down..." [Luke XVII:7]. The rules for the auxiliaries for different verbs were similar to those that are still observed in German and French (see unaccusative verb).

The modern syntax used for the progressive aspect ("I am walking") became dominant by the end of the early modern period, but other forms were also common such as the prefix a- ("I am a-walking") and the infinitive paired with "do" ("I do walk"). Moreover, the to be + -ing verb form could be used to express a passive meaning without any additional markers: "The house is building" could mean "The house is being built".

== Vocabulary ==
A number of words that are still in common use in Modern English have undergone semantic narrowing. The use of the verb "to suffer" in the sense of "to allow" survived into Early Modern English, as in the phrase "suffer the little children" of the King James Version, but it has mostly been lost in Modern English. This use still exists in the idiom "to suffer fools gladly". Also, this period includes one of the earliest Russian borrowings to English (which is historically a rare occasion itself); at least as early as 1600, the word "steppe" (rus. степь) first appeared in English in William Shakespeare's comedy A Midsummer Night's Dream. It is believed that this is a possible indirect borrowing via either German or French. The substantial borrowing of Latin and sometimes Greek words for abstract concepts, begun in Middle English, continued unabated, often terms for abstract concepts not available in English.

== See also ==
- Early modern Britain
- English literature
- History of English
- Inkhorn term
- Elizabethan era, Jacobean era, Caroline era
- English Renaissance
- Shakespeare's influence
- Old English, Middle English, Modern English
