= Shibboleth =

Custom or tradition that distinguishes one group from another

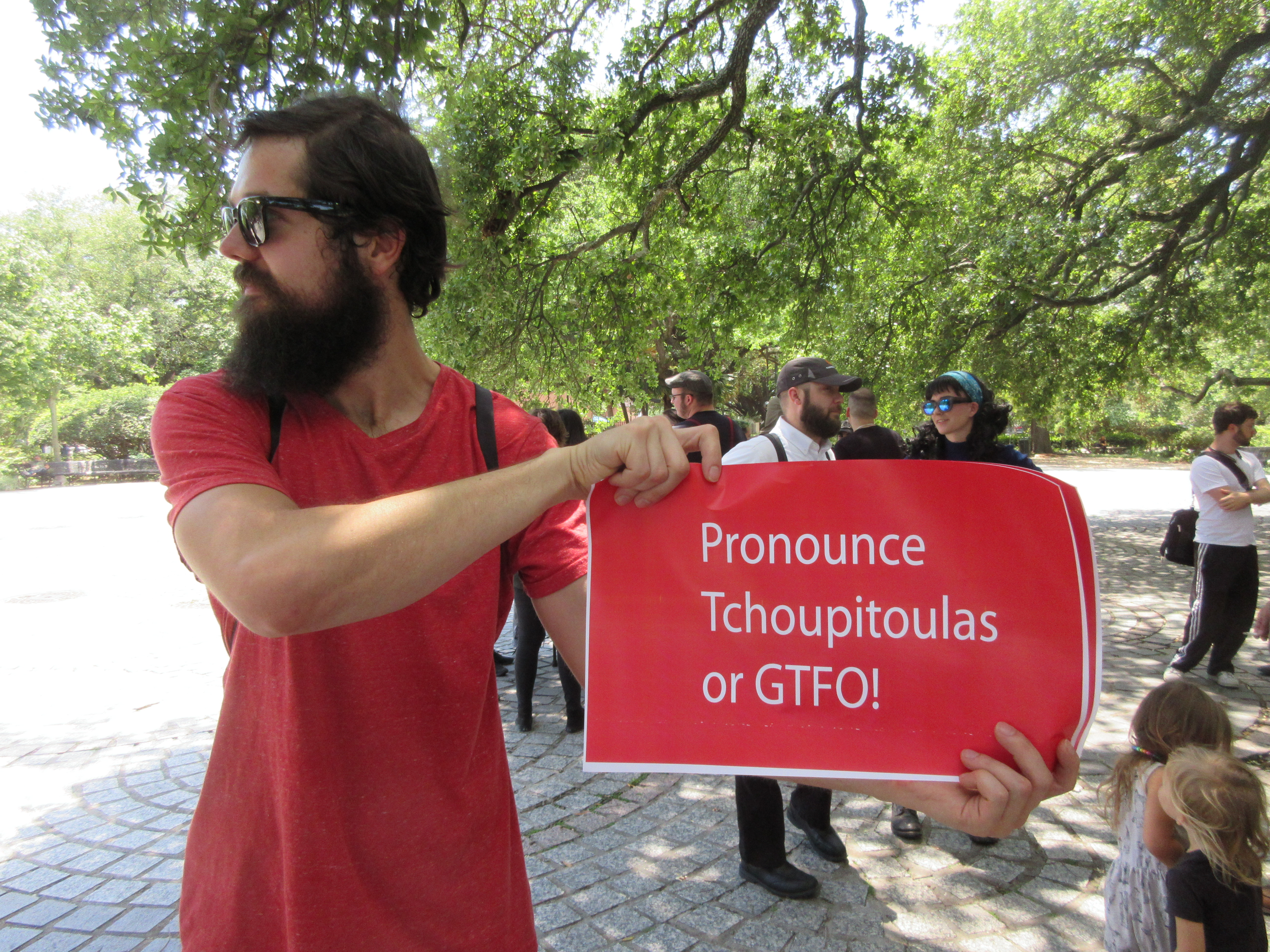
A New Orleans resident challenges out-of-towners who had come to protest against the 2017 removal of the Robert E. Lee Monument. The out-of-towners' inability to pronounce "Tchoupitoulas Street" according to the local fashion would be a shibboleth marking them as outsiders.

A shibboleth (/ˈʃɪbəlɛθ, -ɪθ/ SHIB-əl-eth, -ith;) is any custom or tradition—usually a choice of phrasing or single word—that distinguishes one group of people from another. Historically, shibboleths have been used as passwords, ways of self-identification, signals of loyalty and affinity, ways of maintaining traditional segregation, or protection from threats. The word has also come to mean a moral formula held tenaciously and unreflectingly.

== Origin ==
The term originates from the Hebrew word shibbóleth (שִׁבֹּלֶת pronounced [ʃiˈbolet] in Modern Hebrew), which means the part of a plant containing grain, such as the ear of a stalk of wheat or rye, or less commonly (but arguably more appropriately) (Note: Because the context was crossing a river: see page references in next cited sources.) "flood, torrent".

=== Biblical account ===
The modern use derives from an account in the Hebrew Bible in which pronunciation of this word was used to distinguish Ephraimites, whose dialect used a different first consonant, from Gileadites. The difference concerns the Hebrew letter shin, which is now pronounced as /ʃ/ (as in shoe), a sound also transcribed as š. In the Book of Judges, chapter 12, after the inhabitants of Gilead under the command of Jephthah inflicted a military defeat upon the invading tribe of Ephraim (c. 1370–1070 BCE), the surviving Ephraimites tried to cross the River Jordan back into their home territory, but the Gileadites secured the river's fords to stop them. To identify and kill these Ephraimites, the Gileadites told each suspected survivor to say the word shibboleth. The Ephraimite dialect resulted in a pronunciation that, to Gileadites, sounded like sibboleth. In Judges 12:5–6 in the King James Bible, the anecdote appears thus (with the word already in its current English spelling):

And the Gileadites took the passages of Jordan before the Ephraimites: and it was so, that when those Ephraimites which were escaped said, Let me go over; that the men of Gilead said unto him, Art thou an Ephraimite? If he said, Nay;

Then said they unto him, Say now Shibboleth: and he said Sibboleth: for he could not frame to pronounce it right. Then they took him, and slew him at the passages of Jordan: and there fell at that time of the Ephraimites forty and two thousand.

— Judges 12:5–6

=== Phonetics of the biblical test ===
Shibboleth has been described as the first "password" in Western literature, but exactly how it worked is not known; it has long been debated by scholars of Semitic languages. It may have been quite subtle: the men of Ephraim were unlikely to be "caught totally napping by any test that involved some gross and readily detectable difference of pronunciation". On a superficial reading, the fleeing Ephraimites were betrayed by their dialect: they said sibbōlet. Questions have been raised about why the Ephraimites did not simply repeat what the Gileadite sentries told them to say, since peoples in the region could pronounce both the /ʃ/ and /s/ sounds. Assyriologist Ephraim Avigdor Speiser has said, "We have yet to learn how the suspects were caught by the catchword… [the Ephraimites] surely would have used the required sound to save their necks." A related problem (akin to false positives) is how the test spared neutral tribes with whom the Gileadite guards had no quarrel, yet pinpointed the Ephraimite enemy.

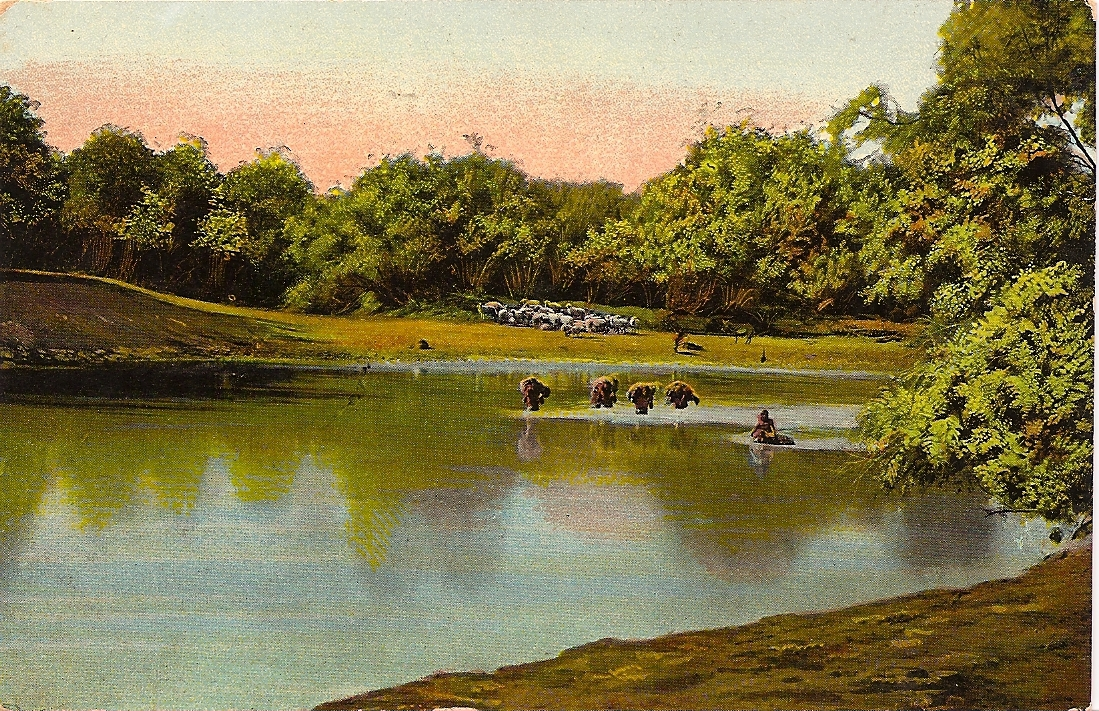
Shepherds fording the river Jordan (old postcard). The men of Ephraim could not cross without saying the password.

Speiser has proposed that the test involved a more challenging sound than could be written down in the later biblical Hebrew narrative, namely the phoneme /θ/ (≈ English "th"). It was present in archaic Hebrew according to Speiser, but later merged with /ʃ/ in Canaanite Semitic dialects. The Gileadites, who lived across a dialect boundary (the Jordan), had retained /θ/ in theirs. Therefore, what the Gileadite guards would have demanded was the password thibbōlet. The phoneme is difficult for naive users; to this day, wrote Speiser, most non-Arab Muslims cannot pronounce the classical Arabic equivalent. Hence, the best the Ephraimite refugees could manage was sibbōlet. Speiser's solution has had a mixed reception but has been revived by Gary A. Rendsburg.

John Emerton argues, "Perhaps [the Ephraimites] could pronounce š, but they articulated the consonant in a different way from the Gileadites, and their pronunciation sounded to the men of Gilead like s." There is a range of ways of pronouncing the two phonemes. "An old clergyman of my acquaintance used to say 'O Lord, save the Queen' in such a way that it sounded [to me] like 'O Lord, shave the Queen'", and analogies could be found amongst Hebrew users in modern Lithuania and Morocco. Berkeley scholar Ronald Hendel agreed, saying the theory was supported by a document recently dug up near modern Amman showing that, across the Jordan, the pronunciation of the phoneme /ʃ/ was heard as /s/ by Hebrew speakers from the opposite bank. Hendel explained, "This is why Gileadite šibbōlet is repeated by the Ephraimites as sibbōlet: they simply repeated the word as they heard it." Other solutions have been proposed.

David Marcus has contended that linguistic scholars have missed the point of the biblical anecdote: the purpose of the later Judean narrator was not to record some phonetic detail, but to satirise the incompetence of "the high and mighty northern Ephraimites. [...] [T]he shibboleth episode ridicules the Ephraimites who are portrayed as incompetent nincompoops who cannot even repeat a test-word spoken by the Gileadite guards."

== Modern use ==
In Modern English, shibboleth can have a sociological meaning, referring to any in-group word or phrase that can distinguish members from outsiders. It is also sometimes used in a broader sense to mean jargon, the proper use of which identifies speakers as members of a particular group or subculture.

In information technology, Shibboleth is a community-wide password that enables members of that community to access an online resource without revealing their individual identities. The origin server can vouch for the identity of the individual user without giving the target server any further identifying information. Thus, the individual user does not know the password that is actually employed—as it is generated internally by the origin server—and so it cannot be betrayed to outsiders.

The term can also be used pejoratively, suggesting that the original meaning of a symbol has in effect been lost, and that the symbol now serves merely to identify allegiance, being described as "nothing more than a shibboleth". In 1956, economist Paul Samuelson applied the term shibboleth in works, including Foundations of Economic Analysis, to mean an idea for which "the means becomes the end, and the letter of the law takes precedence over the spirit". Samuelson admitted that shibboleth is an imperfect term for this phenomenon.

In the context of artificial intelligence, the concept has emerged to signify AI markers and users' detection efforts.

== Examples ==
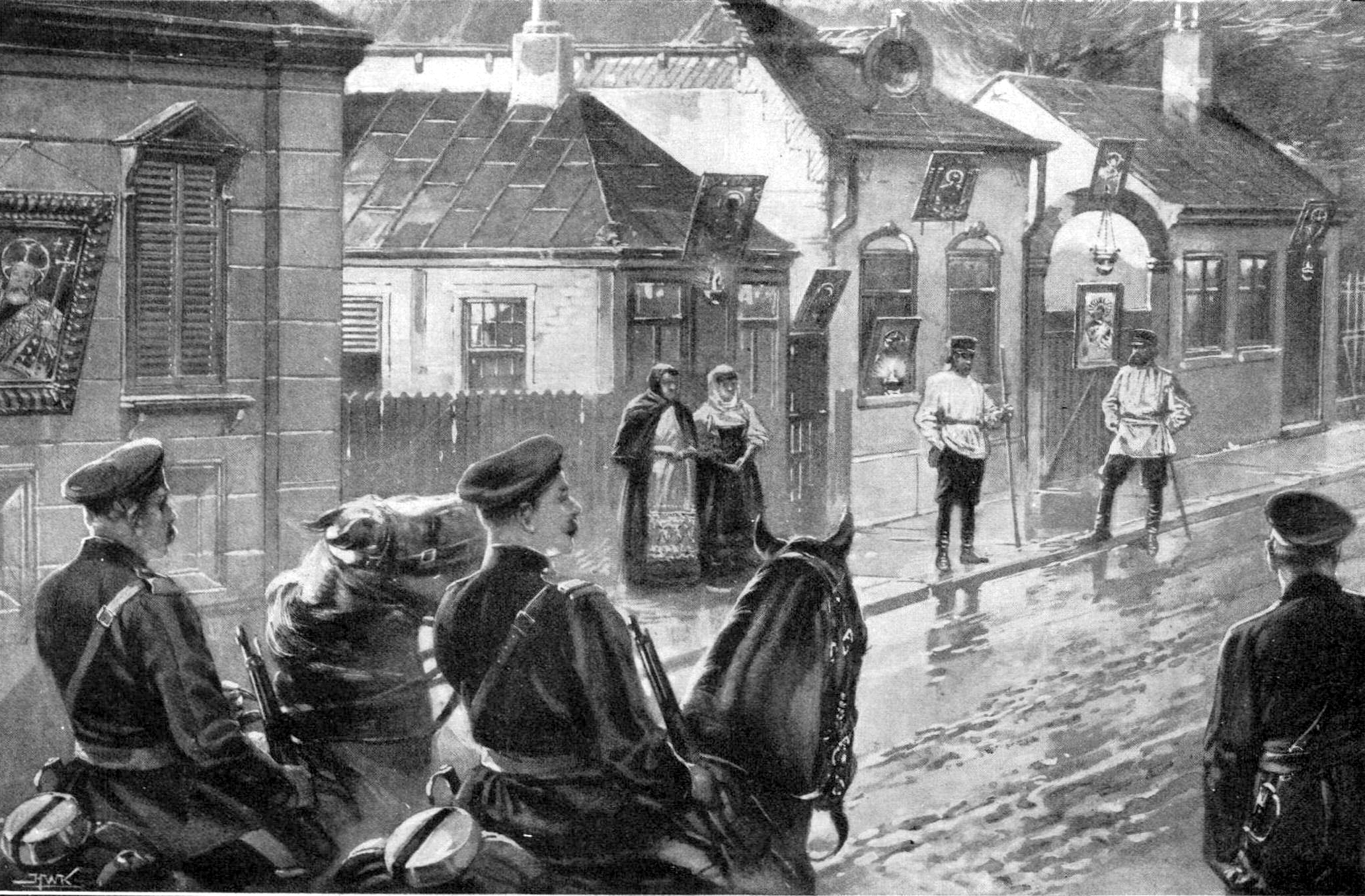
Villagers of Ungheni, Bessarabia Governorate, displaying Christian icons on their homes in order to distinguish themselves from Jews and avoid being targeted during a pogrom in 1905 (painting by Hermanus Willem Koekkoek).

Shibboleths have been used by different subcultures throughout the world at different times. Regional differences, levels of expertise, and computer coding techniques are several forms that shibboleths have taken.

In Sicily, an anecdote recalls that during Sicilian Vespers uprising in 1282, the inhabitants of the island killed the French occupiers who, when questioned, could not correctly pronounce the Sicilian word cìciri ("chickpeas").

One legend has it that before the Battle of the Golden Spurs in May 1302, the Flemish slaughtered every Frenchman they could find in the city of Bruges, an act known as the Matins of Bruges. They identified Frenchmen based on their inability to pronounce the Flemish phrase schild en vriend, "shield and friend", or possibly gilden vriend, "friend of the Guilds". However, many Medieval Flemish dialects did not contain the cluster sch-, either (even today's Kortrijk dialect uses sk-), and Medieval French rolled the r just as Flemish did. (Note: Although the website Language Log: Born on the 11th of July says that the /sχ/ cluster in schild that makes it difficult for French-speakers to pronounce had not yet developed in the 14th century, the phrase "scilt en vrient" is referenced in primary sources such as the Chronique of Gilles Li Muisis as distinguishing French from Flemish.)

Following Mayor Albert's Rebellion in 1312 Kraków, Poles used the Polish language shibboleth Soczewica, koło, miele, młyn ("Lentil, wheel, grinds [verb], mill") to expose German-speaking burghers. Those who could not properly pronounce this phrase were executed.

Bûter, brea, en griene tsiis; wa't dat net sizze kin, is gjin oprjochte Fries

Bûter, brea, en griene tsiis; wa't dat net sizze kin, is gjin oprjochte Fries ("Butter, rye bread, and green cheese, whoever cannot say that is not a genuine Frisian") was a phrase used by the Frisian Pier Gerlofs Donia during the rebellion of Arumer Zwarte Hoop (1515–1523). Ships whose crews could not pronounce this properly were usually plundered, and soldiers who could not were beheaded by Donia.

Newspaper advertisements in the 18th-century United States seeking runaway servants or apprentices frequently used the shibboleth method to identify them. Since most runaways were from the British Isles originally, they were identified by their distinctive regional accents (e.g., "speaks broad Yorkshire)". Studying a large number of these advertisements, Allen Walker Read noticed an exception: runaways were never advertised as having London or eastern counties accents. From this, he inferred that their speech did not differ from the bulk of the American population. Read concluded, "[T]hus in the colonial period American English had a consistency of its own, most closely approximating the type of the region around London."

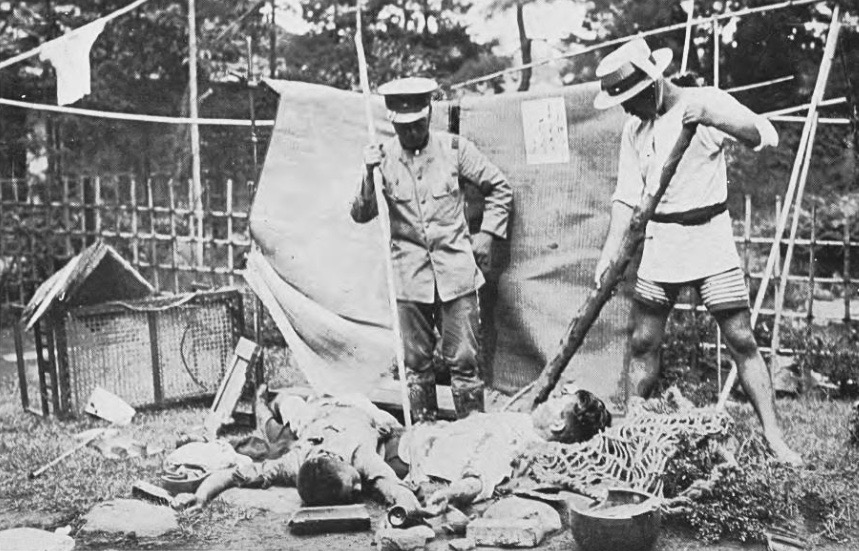
Koreans being stabbed by vigilantes during the Kantō Massacre (1923)

In Japan during the 1923 Kantō Massacre, in which ethnic Koreans in Japan were hunted down and killed by vigilantes after rumors spread that they were committing crimes, shibboleths were attested to having been used to identify Koreans. The Japanese poet Shigeji Tsuboi wrote that he overheard vigilantes asking people to pronounce the phrase jūgoen gojissen (Japanese: 15円50銭, lit. '"fifteen yen, fifty sen"'). If the person pronounced it as chūkoen kochissen, he was reportedly dragged away for punishment. Both Korean and Japanese people recalled similar shibboleths being used, including ichien gojissen (lit. 'one yen, fifty sen'). Other strings attested to were ga-gi-gu-ge-go (Japanese: がぎぐげご) and ka-ki-ku-ke-ko (Japanese: かきくけこ), which were thought difficult for Koreans to pronounce.

In October 1937, the Spanish word for parsley, perejil, was used as a shibboleth to identify Haitian immigrants living along the border in the Dominican Republic. The Dominican dictator, Rafael Trujillo, ordered their execution. It is alleged that between 20,000 and 30,000 individuals were murdered within a few days during the Parsley Massacre, although more-recent scholarship and the lack of evidence such as mass graves puts the actual estimate closer to between 1,000 and 12,168.

During the German occupation of the Netherlands in World War II, the Dutch used the name of the seaside town of Scheveningen as a shibboleth to discern Germans from Dutch ("Sch" in Dutch is analyzed as the letter "s" combined with the digraph "ch", producing the consonant cluster [sx], while in German "Sch" is read as the trigraph "sch", pronounced [ʃ], closer to "sh" in English).

Some U.S. soldiers in the Pacific theater of World War II used the word lollapalooza as a shibboleth to challenge unidentified persons, on the premise that Japanese people would often pronounce both letters L and R as rolled Rs. In Oliver Gramling's Free Men Are Fighting: The Story of World War II (1942), the author notes that during the war, Japanese spies would often approach checkpoints posing as American or Filipino military personnel. The sentry would demand pronunciation of a shibboleth such as lollapalooza and, if the first two syllables were pronounced as rorra, would "open fire without waiting to hear the remainder". Another sign/countersign used by the Allied forces: the challenge/sign was "flash", the password "thunder", and the countersign "Welcome". This was used throughout D-Day during World War II, due to the absence of the voiceless dental fricative /θ/ and voiced labial–velar approximant /w/ in German.

During The Troubles in Northern Ireland, use of the name Derry or Londonderry for the province's second-largest city was often taken as an indication of the speaker's political stance, as it is known as "Derry" to Irish republicans and "Londonderry" to Ulster unionists. As such, the name the speaker used frequently implied more than simply identifying the location. The pronunciation of the name of the letter H is a related shibboleth, with Catholics pronouncing it as "haitch" and Protestants often pronouncing it "aitch".

During the 1983 Black July riots in Sri Lanka, many Tamils were massacred by Sinhalese youths. In many cases, these massacres took the form of boarding buses, getting the passengers to pronounce words that had [b] at the beginning (like baldiya "bucket"), and executing those who found it difficult.

In Australia and New Zealand, the words "fish and chips" are often used to highlight the difference in each country's short-i vowel sound [ɪ], and asking someone to say the phrase can identify which country they are from. Australian English has a higher forward sound [i], close to the y in "happy" and "city", while New Zealand English has a lower backward sound [ɘ], a slightly higher version of the a in about and comma. New Zealanders hear Australians say "feesh and cheeps", while Australians hear New Zealanders say "fush and chups". A long, drawn-out pronunciation of the names of the cities Brisbane and Melbourne, rather than the words ending in the typically Australian quickly spoken -bun, is a common way for someone to be exposed as new to the country. Within Australia, what someone calls a "Devon", or how they name the sizes of beer glasses, can often pinpoint what state they are from, since the nomenclature of both varies across the country.

In Canada, the name of Canada's second-largest city, Montreal, is pronounced /ˌmʌntriˈɔːl/ by English-speaking locals. This contrasts with the typical U.S. pronunciation of the city as /ˌmɒntriˈɔːl/.

In the United States, the name of the state Nevada comes from the Spanish nevada [neˈβaða], meaning "snow-covered". Nevadans pronounce the second syllable with the a as in trap (/nɪˈvædə/), while some people from outside of the state pronounce it with the a as in palm (/nɪˈvɑːdə/). Although many Americans interpret the latter back vowel as being closer to the Spanish pronunciation, it is not the pronunciation used by Nevadans. Likewise, the same test can be used to identify someone unfamiliar with southwest Missouri, as the city of Nevada, Missouri, is pronounced with the a as in cape (/nɪˈveɪdə/).

During the Russo-Ukrainian War (2014–present), Ukrainians have used the word palianytsia (a type of Ukrainian bread) to distinguish between Ukrainians and Russians.

== Furtive shibboleths ==
A furtive shibboleth is a type of a shibboleth that identifies individuals as being part of a group, not based on their ability to pronounce one or more words, but on their ability to recognize a seemingly innocuous phrase as a secret message. For example, members of Alcoholics Anonymous sometimes refer to themselves as "a friend of Bill W.", which is a reference to AA's founder, William Griffith Wilson. To the uninitiated, this would seem like a casual, if off-topic, remark, but other AA members would understand its meaning.

Similarly, during World War II, a gay US sailor might call himself a "friend of Dorothy", a tongue-in-cheek acknowledgment of a stereotypical affinity for Judy Garland in The Wizard of Oz. This code was so effective that the Naval Investigative Service, on learning that the phrase was a way for gay sailors to identify each other, undertook a search for this "Dorothy" whom they believed to be an actual woman with connections to gay servicemen in the Chicago area. Many cruise lines still host "Friends of Dorothy" meetings for LGBT guests to gather.

Cryptolects might also be considered shibboleths, such as gay men in Britain might use the cant language Polari.

Mark Twain used an explicit shibboleth to conceal a furtive shibboleth. In The Innocents Abroad, he told the Shibboleth story in seemingly "inept and uninteresting" detail. To the initiated, however, the wording revealed that Twain was a freemason.

"Fourteen Words", "14", or "14/88" are furtive shibboleths used among white supremacists in the Anglosphere.

== In art ==
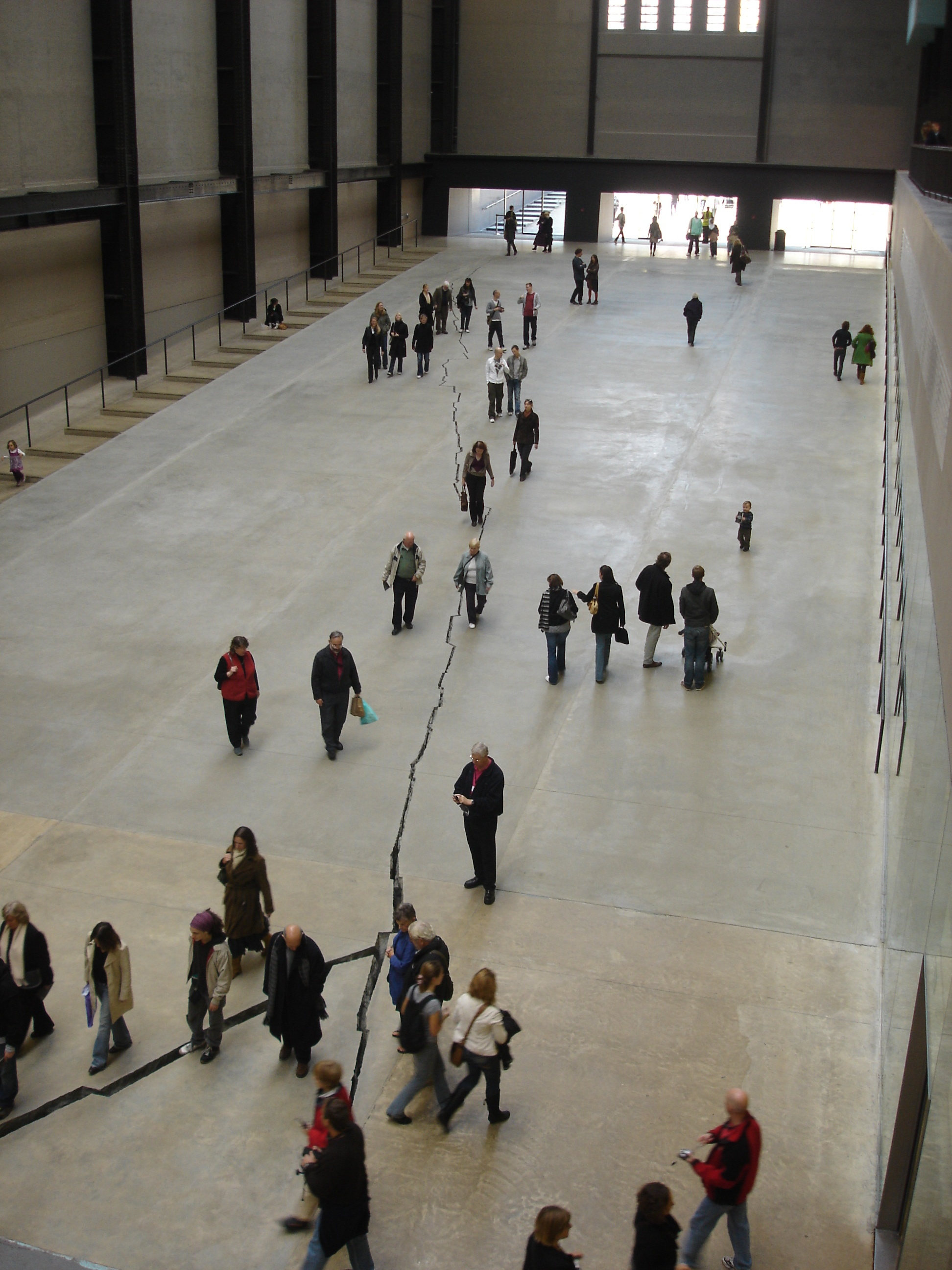
Doris Salcedo's artwork Shibboleth, at Tate Modern, London

Colombian conceptual artist Doris Salcedo created a work titled Shibboleth at Tate Modern, London, in 2007–2008. The piece consisted of a 548-foot-long (167 m) crack that bisected the floor of the Tate's lobby space.

Salcedo said of the work:

It represents borders, the experience of immigrants, the experience of segregation, the experience of racial hatred. It is the experience of a Third World person coming into the heart of Europe. For example, the space which illegal immigrants occupy is a negative space. And so this piece is a negative space.

== See also ==
- Argot
- Cant
- Countersign (military)
- Dog whistle (politics)
- Glottophobia
- Glottopolitics
- Identification friend or foe
- Jargon
- Language analysis for the determination of origin
- Linguistics
- Litmus test (politics)
- Passing (sociology)
- Phonology
- Pons asinorum
- Pronoun game
- Rhyming slang
- Shibboleth Single Sign-on architecture
- Slang
- Sociolect
- The Parsley Massacre
- Tongue-twister
- U and non-U English
