= Mackem Shibboleth =

Public Art in Sunderland, Tyne and Wear, England

- Public Art
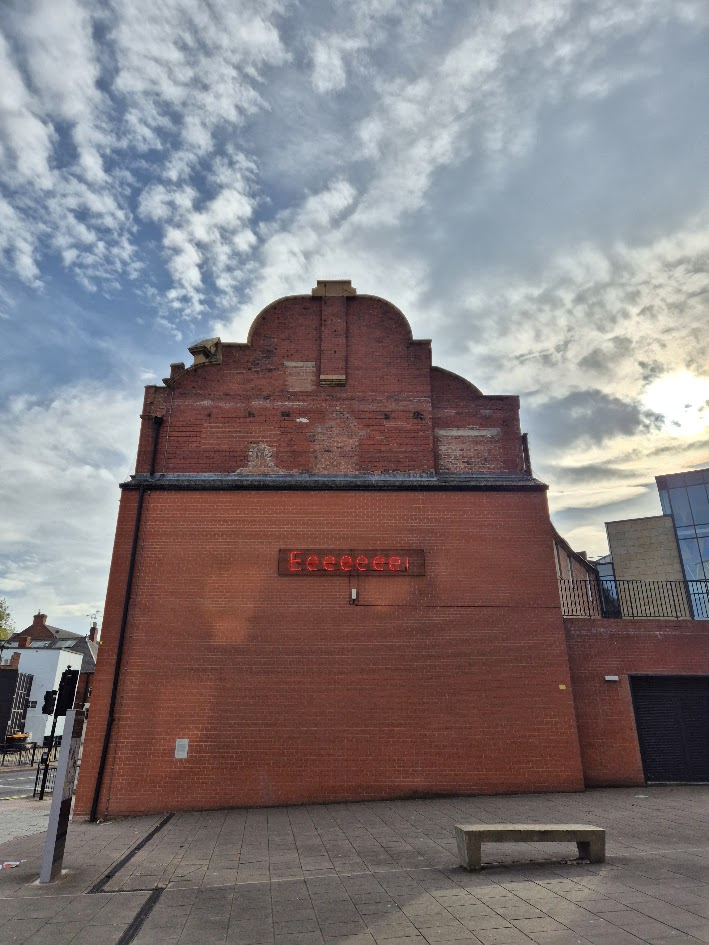
- Mackem Shibboleth

- Location within the United Kingdom
- Coordinates: 54°54′19″N 1°23′24″W
- Grid position: NZ392569
- Location: Tyne and Wear, England, UK

The Mackem Shibboleth in Sunderland, England is a unique neon mural, monumentalising the iconic 'Eeeeeee!', created in 2023 by the South Shields born artist Erin Dickson. It is one of Sunderland's most popular artworks.

== Context ==
The exclamation 'Eeeeeee!' is a distinctive feature of the Mackem dialect, a variety of Northern English spoken in Sunderland. The Oxford English Dictionary defines the term as the "northern English form of Oh!"

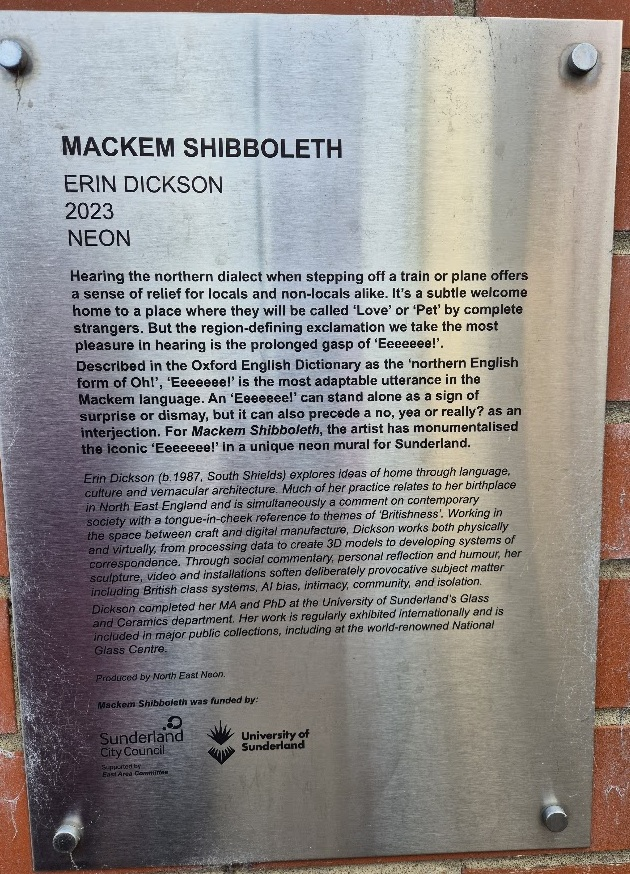
Information Panel

The utterance is noted for its linguistic flexibility; it can be used as a standalone expression to convey surprise or dismay, or function as an interjection preceding other words (e.g., "Eeeeeee, no!" or "Eeeeeee, really?"). The artwork's title employs the term shibboleth to identify the sound as a prominent linguistic feature that can signify local identity.

In March 2025 additional funding was provided by through the Sunderland City Council's East Area Committee for repairs to the artwork and additional protection after it was damaged by vandals.

== About the artist ==
Erin Dickson is a British artist from South Shields, North East England. Her work explores themes of home, language, culture, and vernacular architecture, often referencing her origins in the North East of England and themes of 'Britishness'.

Dickson's practice incorporates both craft and digital manufacturing techniques, and she works with physical and virtual media. Her sculptures, videos, and installations address subjects including the British class system, AI bias, intimacy, and community.

Dickson completed her MA and PhD at the University of Sunderland's Glass and Ceramics department. Her work has been exhibited internationally and is included in public collections, such as that of the National Glass Centre in Sunderland.

== Funding ==
The neon mural was funded by Sunderland City Council supported by the Sunderland East Area Committee, and the University of Sunderland.

== Location ==
The Mackem Shibboleth is located on the gable end of the Sunderland University Hope St Exchange building, in Sunderland City Centre.

== In popular culture ==
Mackem Shibboleth is featured as part of the book Shitty Breaks: A Celebration of Unsung Cities by Ben Aitken.
