= Phrases from Hamlet in common English =

William Shakespeare's play Hamlet has contributed many phrases to common English, from the famous "To be, or not to be" to a few less known, but still in everyday English.

Some also occur elsewhere (e.g. in the Bible) or are proverbial. All quotations are second quarto except as noted:

== Act I ==
=== Scene 1 ===
As the mote is to trouble the mind's eye ("Mind's eye," though it did not originate as a phrase in this play, was popularized by Shakespeare's use of it.)

=== Scene 2 ===
... all that lives must die,
Passing through nature to eternity.

Frailty, thy name is woman!

=== Scene 3 ===
...the primrose path...

Neither a borrower nor a lender be;
For the apparel oft proclaims the man

This above all: to thine ownself be true,

Giving more light than heat,...

=== Scene 4 ===
And to the manner born, ... (i.e., predisposed to the practice. This phrase is sometimes mistakenly rendered as "to the manor born", and used to mean 'of the privileged class”; see references for more on this one. In recent years this misconception has spread through the popularity of the British sitcom To the Manor Born, the title of which was a deliberate pun on Shakespeare's phrase.)

More honoured in the breach than the observance. (Another misunderstood phrase, in the context (the Danes' drinking customs) it signifies that the Danes gain more honour by neglecting their drunken customs than following them; however, it has come to be used in situations where it simply means that a custom is hardly ever followed.)

O, answer me! (Hamlet's anguished cry to his father's ghost)

Something is rotten in the state of Denmark.

=== Scene 5 ===
Murder most foul, ...

The time is out of joint ...

There are more things in heaven and earth, Horatio,
Than are dreamt of in your philosophy.

== Act II ==
=== Scene 2 ===
…caviary to the general. (often repeated as “caviar to the general,” where “the general” signifies the masses or ordinary people) – l. 440

...brevity is the soul of wit,

Though this be madness, yet there is method in 't,

There is nothing either good or bad but thinking makes it so. — (Note: this is a First Folio passage)

What a piece of work is a man!

And yet, to me, what is this quintessence of dust?

...an old man is twice a child.

... man delights not me

O, what a rogue and peasant slave am I!

... and the devil hath power
To assume a pleasing shape;

...The play's the thing wherein I'll catch the conscience of the king.

== Act III ==
=== Scene 1 ===
To be, or not to be: that is the question ...

...what dreams may come, (part of last, the title of a Robin Williams movie.)

When we have shuffled off this mortal coil, (another from To be, or not to be)

Get thee to a nunnery (occurs several places in this scene)

O, woe is me,

=== Scene 2 ===
Speak the speech ...

Purpose is but the slave to memory,

The lady doth protest too much, methinks.

Scene 4

Hoist with his own petard

I must be cruel, only to be kind (several songs, including Cruel to Be Kind by Nick Lowe)

How all occasions do inform against me,

== Act V ==
=== Scene 1 ===
Alas, poor Yorick! I knew him, Horatio (the Horatio is often replaced with the word well, a common misquote; in the previous scene Laertes observes, "I know him well...")

Let Hercules himself do what he may,
The cat will mew and dog will have his day.
Will he nill he.

=== Scene 2 ===
There's a divinity that shapes our ends,
Rough-hew them how we will ...

report me and my cause aright ... To tell my story. (Hamlet's dying request to Horatio)

... The rest is silence. (Hamlet's last words)

Now cracks a noble heart. Good night, sweet prince,
And flights of angels sing thee to thy rest.

...so shall you hear
Of carnal, bloody, and unnatural acts,
Of accidental judgments, casual slaughters,
Of deaths put on by cunning and forced cause, (Horatio's discussion of the play's blood-bath)

== See also ==
- Shakespeare's influence on the English language
