= Shibboleth (artwork) =

Art installation

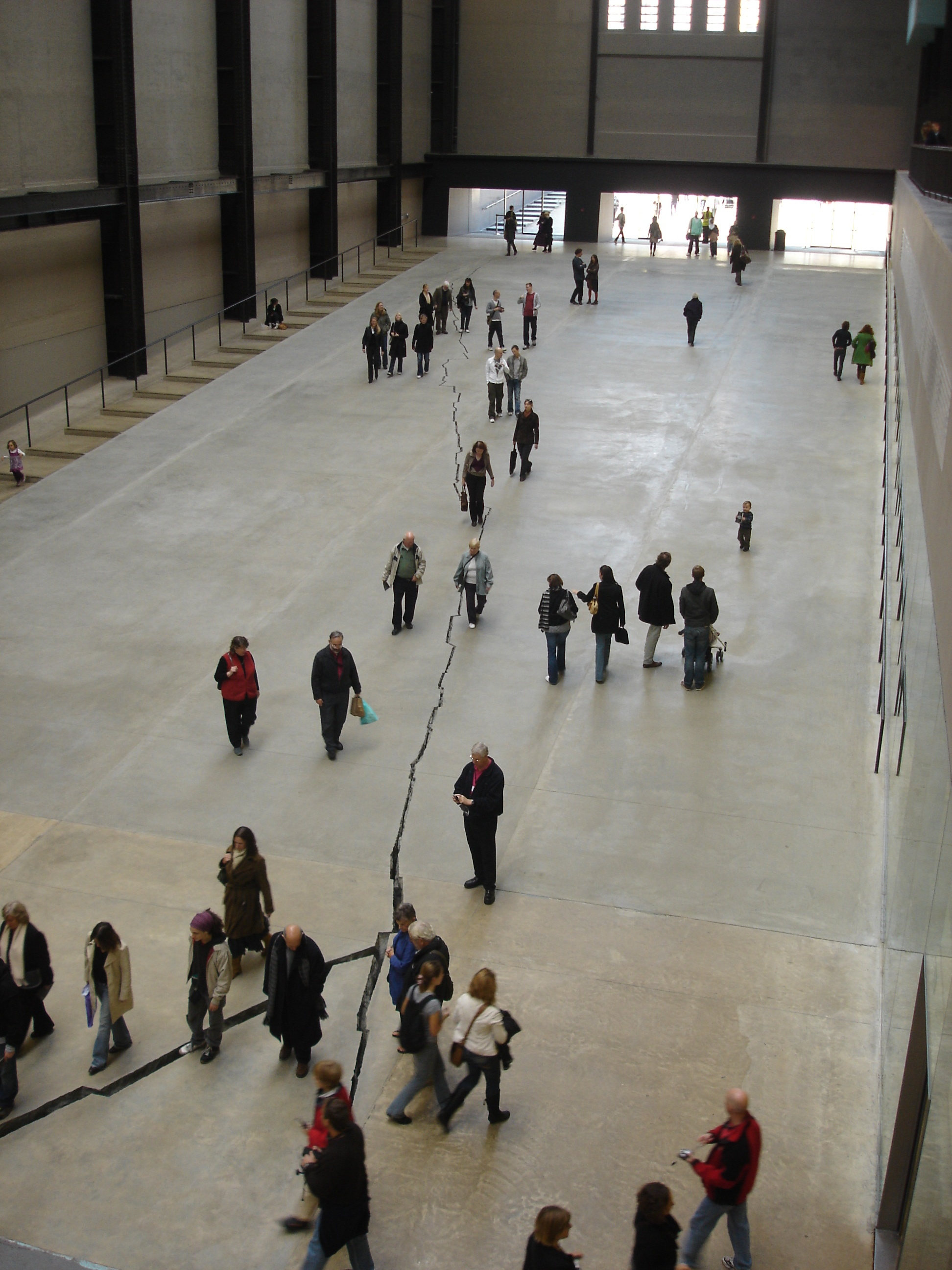
View of Shibboleth, a crack in the floor of the Turbine Hall in Tate Modern in London.

Shibboleth was the title of a temporary art installation placed by the Colombian artist Doris Salcedo in the Tate Modern in 2007. The work took the form of a long crack in the floor.

== Work ==
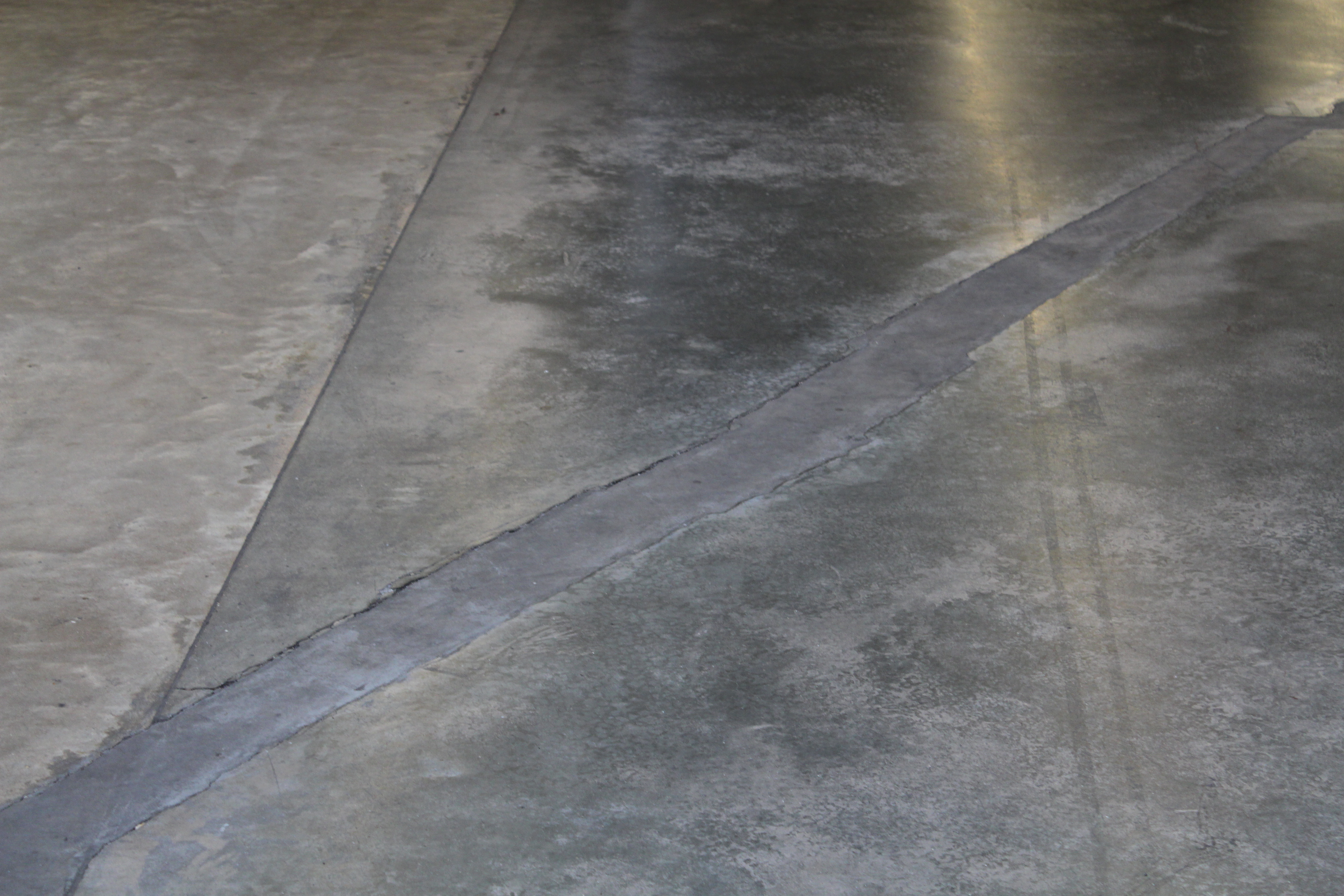
The Turbine Hall floor after Shibboleth had been filled in

Shibboleth by Doris Salcedo was a £300,000 installation, the eighth commission in the "Unilever Series" (sponsored by Unilever), which takes place annually in the Turbine Hall, the main entrance lobby of Tate Modern in London. Salcedo's installation took the form of a 548-foot (167-metre) long, meandering crack in the floor of the Turbine Hall, a hairline crack at one end which expanded to a few inches of width and around two feet of depth at the other. The crack was made by opening up the floor and then inserting a cast from a Colombian rock face. A Tate spokesperson said, "She’s not specifying how it’s been done. What she wants is for people to think about what’s real and what’s not."

Salcedo said of the work:

It represents borders, the experience of immigrants, the experience of segregation, the experience of racial hatred. It is the experience of a Third World person coming into the heart of Europe. For example, the space which illegal immigrants occupy is a negative space. And so this piece is a negative space.

Tate Director Sir Nicholas Serota stated, "There is a crack, there is a line, and eventually there will be a scar. It will remain as a memory of the work and also as a memorial to the issues Doris touches on." The exhibition took place from 9 October 2007 to 6 April 2008. Following the exhibition the crack was filled in, leaving a visible line in the floor.

Engineer Stuart Smith, who was responsible for the realisation and installation of the artwork, has since revealed that it was achieved by casting new concrete on top of the original floor slab.

The work has gained the nickname "Doris's crack".

== Health and safety ==
Prior to the exhibition's opening, the Tate's head of safety and security, Dennis Ahern, had warned of the danger of visitors tripping on the crack "with the potential for significant leg injury," but that "physical protection measures which would normally be applied to a gap of this nature are not deemed appropriate due to its artistic nature." In some places it was wide enough for a small child to fall into. The Tate placed warning signs and designated staff to monitor the exhibit and hand out leaflets. In the first month of the display, fifteen people were injured, mostly minor, but four of the accidents were reported to the Health and Safety Executive.

== See also ==
- Shibboleth
