= Palianytsia =

Type of bread originally from Ukraine

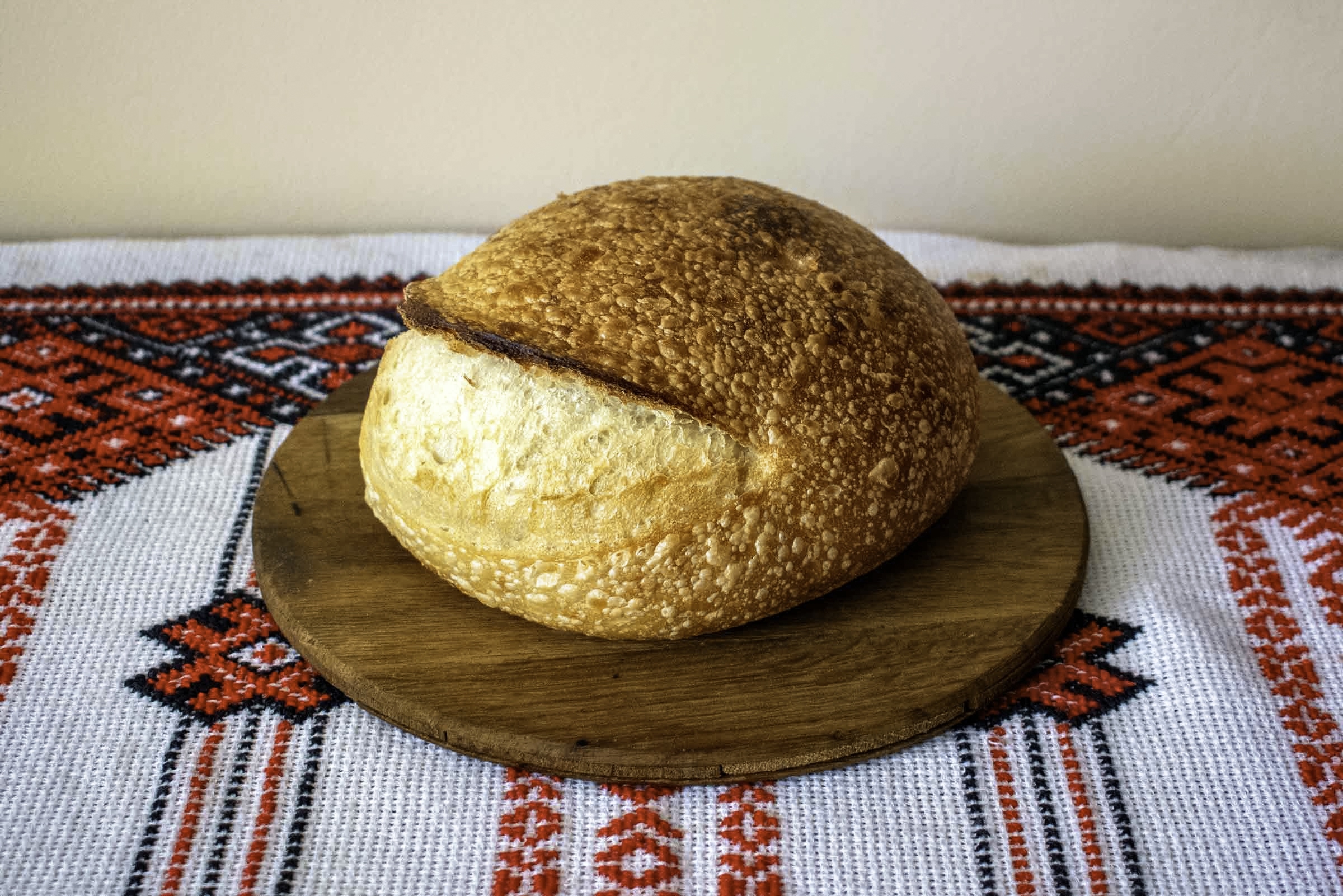
- Type: Bread
- Place of origin: Ukraine
- Main ingredients: Flour

Palianytsia (Ukrainian: паляниця, pronounced [pɐlʲɐˈnɪtsʲɐ]) is a type of Ukrainian hearth-baked bread, made mostly of wheat flour in a home oven. The yeast hearth bread has a semi-circle cut across the top third of the loaf.

== Etymology ==
The word паляниця comes from Ukrainian: палити, romanized: palyty, meaning "to burn" or "to smoke". This is because, when baking the bread, the raised crust can sometimes be burned. Another version is based on the assumption that polianytsia is a traditional bread produced by the Polans (Poliany) an early medieval tribe of Eastern Slavs.

Folklorist, ethnographer, and linguist Mytrofan Dykariv proposes that the word palianytsia comes from the Greek: πέλανος, romanized: pélanos , which referred to round cakes offered to the gods.

== Recipe ==
Traditional palianytsia was baked from a dough made with hops, year or sourdough, wheat flour and salt and baked.

According to GOST 12793-77, the bakeries of the USSR produced a standardized "Ukrainian palianytsia" baked in molds. It had a mass of 750 g to 1 kg, with a lateral cut of 3/4 of a circle.

== Symbolism ==
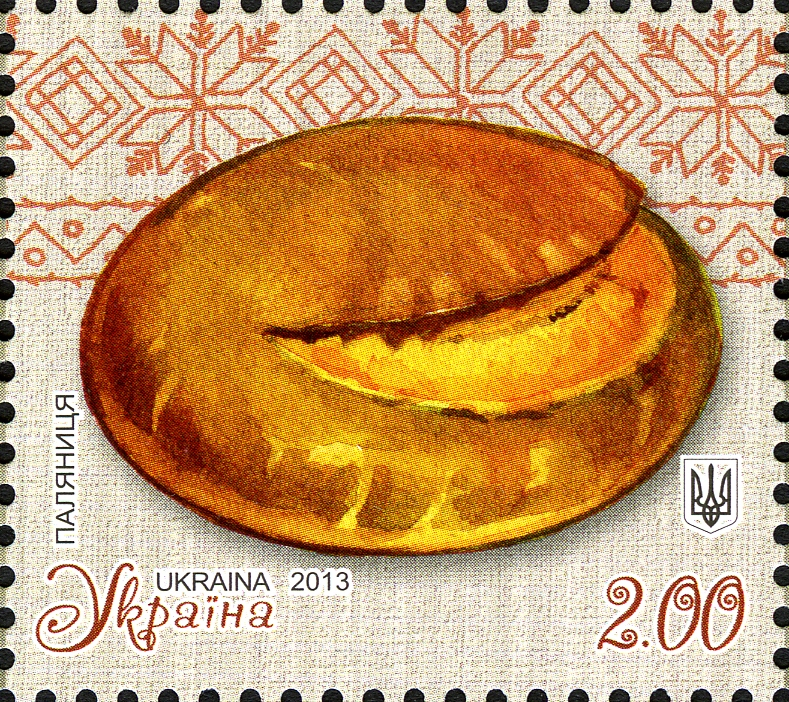
Palianytsia depicted on a Ukrainian postage stamp

In Christianity, palianytsia, like bread in general, symbolizes happiness and can represent well-being, the body of God, affection, hospitality and security. Palianytsia can also be interpreted as a symbol of the sun.

== As a shibboleth ==
The word palianytsia is used as an important shibboleth test in the Ukrainian language, to identify people not well-versed in the Ukrainian phonology. During the Russian invasion of Ukraine, the word was often used to identify Russian soldiers or saboteurs, some of whom, when captured, claimed to be Ukrainians. Instead of pronouncing паляниця (palianytsia) as [pɐlʲɐˈnɪt͡sʲɐ], Russian speakers would often mispronounce the stressed Ukrainian letter и (y), which represents the non-palatal vowel /ɪ/, as palatal /^{(j)}i/, (Note: In Russian, the palatal /^{(j)}i/ is represented by the stressed letter и.) which is represented instead by Ukrainian і (i); they also often mispronounce the first unstressed я (ya) as [ʲɪ] and the second unstressed я (ya) - after the letter ц (ts) - as [ə]. (Note: This mistake is particularly widespread because the phoneme /t͡s/ is never palatalized in Russian, unlike in Ukrainian.) Thus the result is [pɐlʲɪˈnʲit͡sə], sounding as if it were spelt пальиніца (pal'ynitsa) or палініца (palinitsa) with Ukrainian letters.

== See also ==
- Knish
- Korovai
