= Countersign (military) =

Signal given when approaching a military post

In military terminology, a countersign is a sign, word, or any other signal previously agreed upon and required to be exchanged between a picket or guard and anybody approaching his or her post. The term usually encompasses both the sign given by the approaching party as well as the sentry's reply. However, in some militaries, the countersign is strictly the reply of the sentry to the password given by the person approaching.

== History ==
A well-known sign/countersign used by the Allied forces on D-Day during World War II: the challenge/sign was "flash", the password "thunder" and the countersign (to challenge the person giving the first codeword) "Welcome".

Some countersigns include words that are difficult for an enemy to pronounce (shibboleths). For instance, in the above example, the word "thunder" contains a voiceless dental fricative (/θ/), which does not exist in German.

== In literature ==
The opening lines of William Shakespeare's play Hamlet between soldiers on duty are viewed as representing a crude sign in which the line "Long live the King!" was a sign between soldiers:

Bernardo. Who's there?
Francisco. Nay, answer me. Stand and unfold yourself.
Bernardo. Long live the King!
Francisco. Bernardo?
Bernardo. He.

== See also ==
- Challenge–response authentication
- Military communications
- Shibboleth
