= Influence of William Shakespeare =

Impact of English playwright and poet

William Shakespeare (National Portrait Gallery), in the famous Chandos portrait

William Shakespeare's influence extends from theatre and literature to present-day movies, Western philosophy, and the English language itself. William Shakespeare is widely regarded as the greatest writer in the history of the English language, and the world's pre-eminent dramatist. He transformed European theatre by expanding expectations about what could be accomplished through innovation in characterization, plot, language and genre. Shakespeare's writings have also impacted many notable novelists and poets over the years, including Herman Melville, Charles Dickens, and Maya Angelou, and continue to influence new authors even today. Shakespeare is the most quoted writer in the history of the English-speaking world after the various writers of the Bible; many of his quotations and neologisms have passed into everyday usage in English and other languages. According to Guinness Book of World Records Shakespeare remains the world’s best-selling playwright, with sales of his plays and poetry believed to have achieved in excess of four billion copies in the over 400 years since his death. He is also the third most translated author in history.

== Changes in English at the time ==
Early Modern English as a literary medium was unfixed in structure and vocabulary in comparison to Greek, Hebrew and Latin, and was in a constant state of flux. When William Shakespeare began writing his plays, the English language was rapidly absorbing words from other languages due to wars, exploration, diplomacy and colonization. By the age of Elizabeth, English had become widely used with the expansion of philosophy, theology and physical sciences, but many writers lacked the vocabulary to express such ideas. To accommodate this, writers such as Edmund Spenser, Sir Philip Sidney, Christopher Marlowe and William Shakespeare expressed new ideas and distinctions by inventing, borrowing or adopting a word or a phrase from another language, known as neologising. Scholars estimate that, between the years 1500 and 2018, nouns, verbs, pronouns and modifiers of Latin, Greek and modern Romance languages added 30,000 new words to the English language.

== Influence on theatre ==
Shakespeare's works have been a major influence on subsequent theatre. He developed theatre to an amazing extent and changed the way theatre is today. Shakespeare created some of the most admired plays in Western literature (with Macbeth, Hamlet and King Lear being ranked among the world's greatest plays), and transformed English theatre by expanding expectations about what could be accomplished through plot and language. Specifically, in plays like Hamlet, Shakespeare "integrated characterization with plot," such that if the main character was different in any way, the plot would be totally changed. In Romeo and Juliet, Shakespeare mixed tragedy and comedy together to create a new romantic tragedy genre (previous to Shakespeare, romance had not been considered a worthy topic for tragedy). Through his soliloquies, Shakespeare showed how plays could explore a character's inner motivations and conflict (up until Shakespeare, soliloquies were often used by playwrights to "introduce [characters], convey information, provide an exposition or reveal plans").

=== Characters ===
His plays exhibited "spectacular violence, with loose and episodic plotting, and with a mingling of comedy with tragedy". In King Lear, Shakespeare had deliberately brought together two plots of different origins. Shakespeare's work is also lauded for its insight into emotion. His themes regarding the human condition make him more acclaimed than any of his contemporaries. Humanism and contact with popular thinking gave vitality to his language. Shakespeare's plays borrowed ideas from popular sources, folk traditions, street pamphlets, and sermons. Shakespeare also used groundlings widely in his plays. The use of groundlings "saved the drama from academic stiffness and preserved its essential bias towards entertainment in comedy". Hamlet is an outstanding example of "groundlings" quickness and response. Use of groundlings enhanced Shakespeare's work practically and artistically. He represented English people more concretely and not as puppets. His skills have found expression in chronicles, or history plays, and tragedies.

Shakespeare's earliest years were dominated by history plays and a few comedies that formed a link to the later written tragedies. Nine out of eighteen plays he produced in the first decade of his career were chronicles or histories. His histories were based on the prevailing Tudor political thought. They portrayed the follies and achievements of kings, their misgovernment, church and problems arising out of these. "In shaping, compressing, and altering chronicles, Shakespeare gained the art of dramatic design; and in the same way he developed his remarkable insight into character, its continuity and its variation". His characters were very near to reality.

"Shakespeare's characters are more sharply individualized after Love's Labour's Lost". His Richard II and Bolingbroke are complex and solid figures whereas Richard III has more "humanity and comic gusto". The Falstaff trilogy is in this respect very important. Falstaff, although a minor character, has a powerful reality of his own. "Shakespeare uses him as a commentator who passes judgments on events represented in the play, in the light of his own superabundant comic vitality". Falstaff, although outside "the prevailing political spirit of the play", throws insight into the different situations arising in the play. This shows that Shakespeare had developed a capacity to see the plays as whole, something more than characters and expressions added together. In the Falstaff trilogy, through the character of Falstaff, he wants to show that in society "where touchstone of conduct is a success, and in which humanity has to accommodate itself to the claims of expediency, there is no place for Falstaff", a loyal human being.

Shakespeare united the three main streams of literature: verse, poetry, and drama. To the versification of the English language, he imparted his eloquence and variety giving highest expressions with elasticity of language. The second, the sonnets and poetry, was bound in structure. He imparted economy and intensity to the language. In the third and the most important area, the drama, he saved the language from vagueness and vastness and infused actuality and vividness. Shakespeare's work in prose, poetry, and drama marked the beginning of the modernization of English language by introduction of words and expressions, style and form to the language.

== Influence on European and American literature ==
Shakespeare influenced many writers in the following centuries, including major novelists such as Herman Melville, Charles Dickens, Thomas Hardy and William Faulkner. Examples of this influence include the large number of Shakespearean quotations throughout Dickens' writings and the fact that at least 25 of Dickens' titles are drawn from Shakespeare, while Melville frequently used Shakespearean devices, including formal stage directions and extended soliloquies, in Moby-Dick. In fact, Shakespeare so influenced Melville that the novel's main antagonist, Captain Ahab, is a classic Shakespearean tragic figure, "a great man brought down by his faults." Shakespeare has also influenced a number of English poets, especially Romantic poets such as Samuel Taylor Coleridge who were obsessed with self-consciousness, a modern theme Shakespeare anticipated in plays such as Hamlet. Shakespeare's writings were so influential to English poetry of the 1800s that critic George Steiner has called all English poetic dramas from Coleridge to Tennyson "feeble variations on Shakespearean themes."

Organisms named after Shakespeare's works include Iago, a genus of houndsharks, and Oberonia, a genus of orchids.

== Influence on the English language ==
Shakespeare's writings greatly influenced the entire English language. Before and during Shakespeare's time, the grammar and rules of English were not standardised. But once Shakespeare's plays became popular in the late seventeenth and eighteenth century, they helped contribute to the standardization of the English language, with many Shakespearean words and phrases becoming embedded in the English language, particularly through projects such as Samuel Johnson's A Dictionary of the English Language which quoted Shakespeare more than any other writer. He expanded the scope of English literature by introducing new words and phrases, experimenting with blank verse, and also introducing new poetic and grammatical structures.

=== Vocabulary ===
Shakespeare introduced or invented countless words in his plays, with estimates of the number in the several thousands. Warren King clarifies by saying that, "In all of his work – the plays, the sonnets and the narrative poems – Shakespeare uses 17,677 words: Of those, 1,700 were first used by Shakespeare." He is also well known for borrowing from the classical literature and foreign languages. He created these words by "changing nouns into verbs, changing verbs into adjectives, connecting words never before used together, adding prefixes and suffixes, and devising words wholly original." Many of Shakespeare's original phrases are still used in conversation and language today. These include, but are not limited to; "seen better days, strange bedfellows, a sorry sight," and "full circle". Shakespeare added a considerable number of words to the English language when compared to additions to English vocabulary made in other times. Shakespeare helped to further develop the style and structure of an otherwise loose, spontaneous language. Written Elizabethan English stylistically closely followed the spoken language. The naturalness gave force and freedom since there was no formalised prescriptive grammar binding the expression. While lack of prescribed grammatical rules introduced vagueness in literature, it also expressed feelings with profound vividness and emotion, which create "freedom of expression" and "vividness of presentment". It was a language that expressed feelings explicitly. Shakespeare's gift involved using the exuberance of the language and decasyllabic structure in prose and poetry of his plays to reach the masses, and the result was "a constant two-way exchange between learned and the popular, together producing the unique combination of racy tang and the majestic stateliness that informs the language of Shakespeare".

While it is probable that Shakespeare created many new words, an article in National Geographic points out the findings of historian Jonathan Hope who wrote in "Shakespeare's 'Native English'" that "the Victorian scholars who read texts for the first edition of the OED paid special attention to Shakespeare: his texts were read more thoroughly and cited more often, so he is often credited with the first use of words, or senses of words, which can, in fact, be found in other writers."

=== Blank verse ===
Many critics and scholars consider Shakespeare's first plays experimental and believe the playwright was still learning from his own mistakes. Gradually, his language followed the "natural process of artistic growth, to find its adequate projection in dramatic form". As he continued experimenting, his style of writing found many manifestations in plays. The dialogues in his plays were written in verse form and followed a decasyllabic rule. In Titus Andronicus, decasyllables have been used throughout. "There is a considerable pause; and though the inflexibility of the line sound is little affected by it, there is a certain running over of sense". His work is still experimental in Titus Andronicus. However, in Love's Labour's Lost and The Comedy of Errors, there is "perfect meter-abundance of rime [rhyme], plenty of prose, the arrangement in stanza". After these two comedies, he kept experimenting until he reached a maturity of style. "Shakespeare's experimental use of trend and style, as well as the achieved development of his blank verses, are all evidence of his creative invention and influences". Through experimentation of tri-syllabic substitution and decasyllabic rule he developed the blank verse to perfection and introduced a new style.

"Shakespeare's blank verse is one of the most important of all his influences on the way the English language was written". He used the blank verse throughout his writing career, experimenting and perfecting it. The free speech rhythm gave Shakespeare more freedom for experimentation. "Adaptation of free speech rhythm to the fixed blank-verse framework is an outstanding feature of Shakespeare's poetry". The striking choice of words in commonplace blank verse influenced "the run of the verse itself, expanding into images which eventually seem to bear significant repetition, and to form, with the presentation of character and action correspondingly developed, a more subtle and suggestive unity". Expressing emotions and situations in form of a verse gave a natural flow to language with an added sense of flexibility and spontaneity.

=== Poetry ===
He introduced in poetry two main factors – "verbal immediacy and the moulding of stress to the movement of living emotion". Shakespeare's words reflected the passage of time with "fresh, concrete vividness" giving the reader an idea of the time frame. His remarkable capacity to analyse and express emotions in simple words was noteworthy:

"When my love swears that she is made of truth,
I do believe her, though I know she lies–"

— (Sonnet CXXXVIII)

In the sonnet above, he has expressed in very simple words "complex and even contradictory attitudes to a single emotion".

The sonnet form was limited structurally, in theme and in expressions. The liveliness of Shakespeare's language and the strict discipline of the sonnets imparted economy and intensity to his writing style. "It encouraged the association of compression with a depth of content and variety of emotional response to a degree unparalleled in English". Complex human emotions found simple expressions in Shakespeare's language.

== See also ==
- Shakespeare and Star Trek
- Phrases from Hamlet in common English
- List of idioms attributed to Shakespeare
