= Speak the speech =

Speech from Hamlet

"Speak the speech" is a famous speech from Shakespeare's Hamlet (1601). In it, Hamlet offers directions and advice to a group of actors whom he has enlisted to play for the court of Denmark.

The speech itself has played two important roles independent of the play. It has been analyzed as a historical document for clues about the nature of early modern acting practices and it has also been used as a contemporary guide to the performance of Shakespearean drama.

While there is some justification for each of these approaches, they should be distinguished from other, far less valid assertions: on the one hand, that Hamlet expresses the opinions of Shakespeare on the art of acting in a straightforward and unproblematic way; on the other, that the speech offers a proto-Stanislavskian view of the art of acting. The first elides the difference between author and character, while the second ignores the historical specificity of the discourses and meanings attached to theatrical performance.

== Works cited ==
- Edwards, Philip, ed. 1985. Hamlet, Prince of Denmark by William Shakespeare. The New Cambridge Shakespeare Ser. Cambridge: Cambridge University Press. ISBN 0-521-29366-9.
- Hall, Peter. 2004. Shakespeare's Advice to the Players. London: Oberon. ISBN 1-84002-411-9.
- Innes, Christopher D. 2000. A sourcebook on naturalist theatre. London: Routledge. ISBN 978-0-415-15228-0.
- Merlin, Bella. 2007. The Complete Stanislavsky Toolkit. London: Nick Hern. ISBN 978-1-85459-793-9.
- Rodenberg, Patsy. 2002. Speaking Shakespeare. London: Methuen. ISBN 0-413-70040-2.
- Roach, Joseph R. 1985. The Player's Passion: Studies in the Science of Acting. Theater:Theory/Text/Performance Ser. Ann Arbor: University of Michigan Press. ISBN 0-472-08244-2.
