= Mario Opazo =

Colombian artist

Mario Opazo (born 1969) is a Colombian video, installation and performance artist. He was born in Tomé, Chile and became a political exile after Pinochet came to power.

He studied at the Jorge Tadeo Lozano University of Fine Arts. Mario Opazo's artistic work reflects upon the moving image, and on art as it relates to contemporary problems across various artistic practices, such as installation, performance, video art, and film. He is a professor at the National University of Colombia.

Opazo was one of a number of artists exhibiting within the Istituto Italo-Latino Americano display in Palazzo Zenobio during the 2007 Venice Biennale.

Mario Opazo's work is represented in the collections of the Museo Extremeño e Iberoamericano de Arte Contemporáneo (MEIAC) in Badajoz and Museum of Latin American Art (MOLAA) in Long Beach, CA.
