= Doris Salcedo =

Colombian installation and sculpture artist (born 1958)

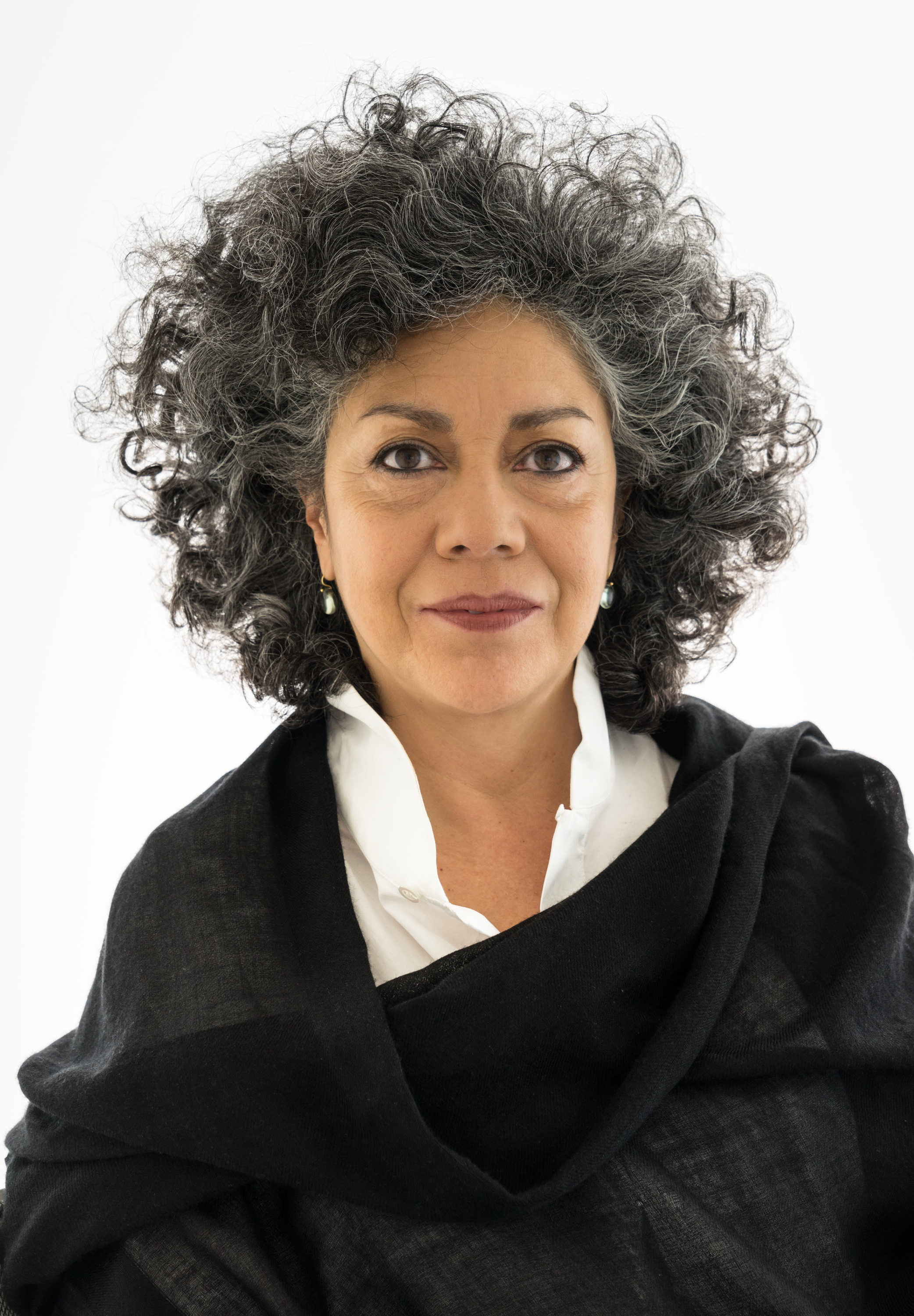
- Salcedo in 2015
- Born: 1958 (age 67–68); Bogotá D.C., Colombia
- Education: Jorge Tadeo Lozano University (BA); New York University (MFA)
- Notable work: Shibboleth (2007); Fragmentos (2018)
- Movement: Art as Activism
- Awards: Guggenheim Fellowship (1995); The Ordway Prize, from the Penny McCall Foundation (2005); Commission from Tate Modern, London (2007); Velázquez Visual Arts Prize (2010); Hiroshima Art Prize (2014)

Doris Salcedo (born 1958) is a Colombian visual artist and sculptor. Her work is influenced by her experiences of life in Colombia and is generally composed of commonplace items such as wooden furniture, clothing, concrete, grass, and rose petals. Salcedo's work gives form to pain, trauma, and loss, while creating space for individual and collective mourning. These themes stem from her own personal history. Members of her own family were among the many people who have disappeared in politically troubled Colombia. Much of her work deals with the fact that, while the death of a loved one can be mourned, their disappearance leaves an unbearable emptiness. Salcedo lives and works in Bogotá, Colombia.

== Early life and education ==
Doris Salcedo was born in 1958 in Bogotá, Colombia. She completed a Bachelor of Fine Arts at Jorge Tadeo Lozano University in 1980, before traveling to New York City, where she completed a Master of Fine Arts degree at New York University in 1984. She then returned to Bogotá to teach at the Universidad Nacional de Colombia. She is married to Colombian novelist and sociologist Azriel Bibliowicz, whose work investigates the Jewish experience in Colombia. The couple lives and works in Bogotá.

== Art as repair ==
Untitled (1997–1999) at the Metropolitan Museum of Art in 2022

Salcedo addresses the question of forgetting and memory in her installation artwork. In pieces such as Unland: The Orphan's Tunic from 1997 and the La Casa Viuda series from the early 1990s, Salcedo takes ordinary household items, such as a chair and table, and transforms them into memorials for victims of the Civil War in Colombia.

In his book Present Pasts: Urban Palimpsests and the Politics of Memory, Andreas Huyssen dedicates a chapter to Salcedo and Unland: The Orphan's Tunic, presenting her work as "Memory Sculpture." Huyssen offers a detailed description of the piece, a seemingly mundane table that, when considered closely, "captures the viewer's imagination in its unexpected, haunting visual and material presence." A seemingly everyday piece of furniture is in fact made of two destroyed tables joined and covered with a whitish veil of fabric, presumably the orphan's original tunic. Upon even closer inspection, hundreds of small human hairs appear to be the thread that is attaching the tunic to the table. Huyssen equates the structure of the tables to the body. "If the tunic is like a skin...then the table gains a metaphoric presence as body, not now of an individual orphan but an orphaned community." Salcedo's Unland is a memory sculpture, presenting the past of her own country, Colombia to the international art audience.

During a conversation with Carlos Basualdo, Salcedo discusses her own approach to producing art:

"The way that an artwork brings materials together is incredibly powerful. Sculpture is its materiality. I work with materials that are already charged with significance, with meaning they have required in the practice of everyday life...Then, I work to the point where it becomes something else, where metamorphosis is reached."

Again, in a 1998 interview with Charles Merewether, Salcedo expounds on this notion of metamorphosis, describing the viewer's experience with her own artistic repair or restoration of the past.

"The silent contemplation of each viewer permits the life seen in the work to reappear. Change takes place as if the victim's experience were reaching out...The sculpture presents the experience as something present- a reality that resounds within the silence of each human being that gazes upon it."

Salcedo employs objects from the past, objects imbued with a strong sense of history, and, through these contemporary memory sculptures, illustrates the flow of time. She joins the past and the present, repairs what she sees as incomplete, and, in the eyes of Huyssen, presents "memory at the edge of an abyss...memory in the literal sense...and memory as process."

== Installations ==
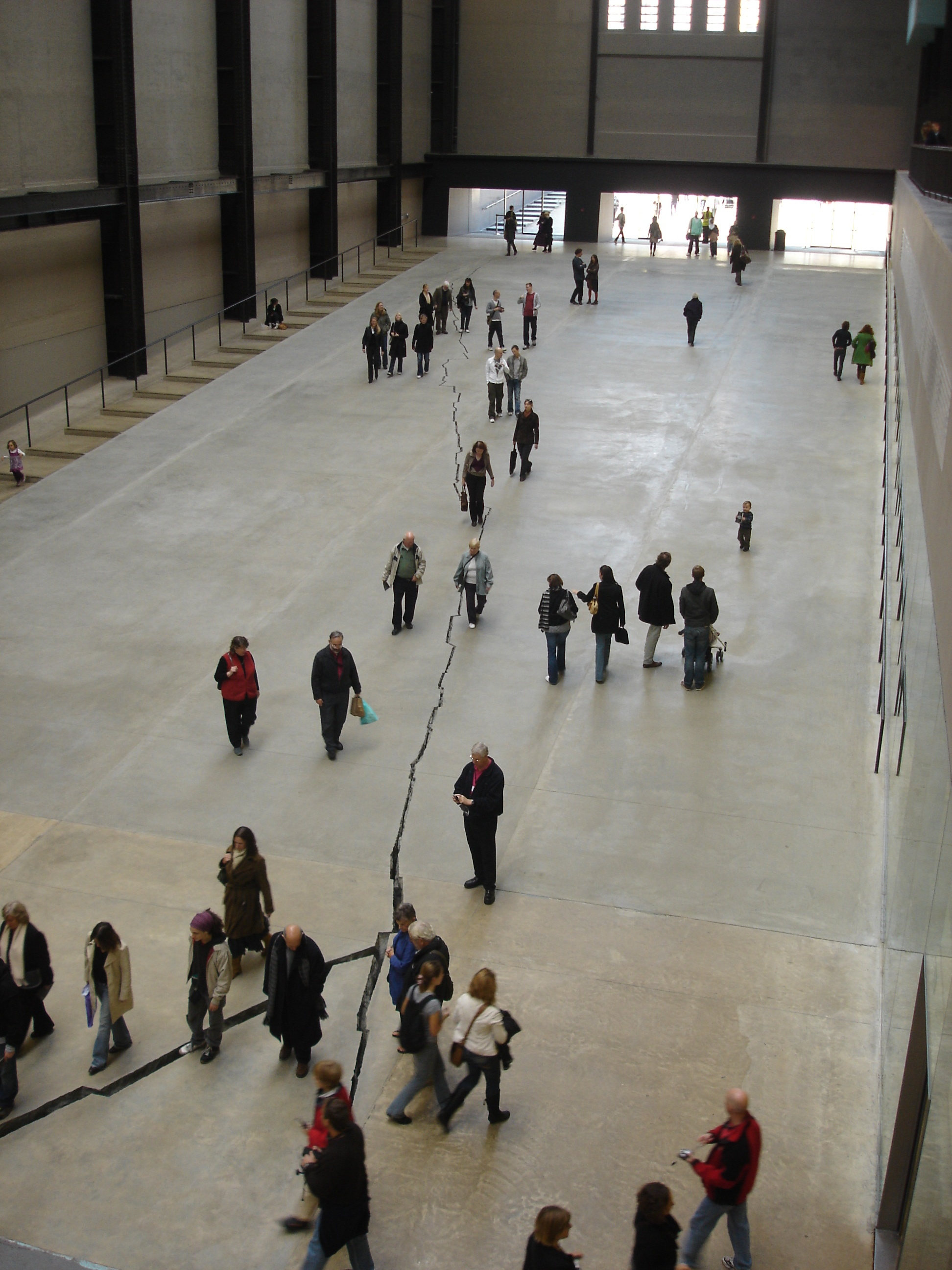
Shibboleth (2007) at Tate Modern

Salcedo's work has become increasingly installation-based. She uses gallery spaces or unusual locations to create art and environments that are politically and historically charged. Noviembre 6 y 7 (2002) is a work commemorating the seventeenth anniversary of the violent seizure of the Supreme Court in Bogotá on November 6 and 7, 1985. Salcedo placed this piece in the new Palace of Justice. It took her over 53 hours (the duration of the original siege) to place wooden chairs against the building's façade, which were lowered from different points on its roof. Salcedo did this by creating "an act of memory". Her goal was to re-inhabit the space that was forgotten.

In 2003, in a work she called Installation for the 8th Istanbul Biennial, she installed 1,500 wooden chairs precariously in a commonplace street, stacked in the space between two buildings.

In 2005, at the Castello di Rivoli, Salcedo reworked one of the institution's major rooms by extending the existing vaulted brick ceiling of the gallery. Subtly transforming the existing space, Abyss was designed to evoke thoughts of incarceration and entombment.

In 2007, Salcedo became the eighth artist to have been commissioned to produce work for the Unilever turbine hall of the Tate Modern gallery in London, for which she created Shibboleth, a 167-metre-long crack running the length of the hall's floor. Salcedo said it "represents borders, the experience of immigrants, the experience of segregation, the experience of racial hatred. It is the experience of a Third World person coming into the heart of Europe". In this way, her installation represented exclusion, separation and otherness. It was named by Frieze as No.21 of "The 25 Best Works of the 21st Century".

== Exhibitions ==
Salcedo has exhibited in group exhibitions internationally including Carnegie International (1995), XXIV São Paulo Biennial (1998), Trace, The Liverpool Biennial of Contemporary Art (1999), Documenta XI, Kassel (2002), 8th Istanbul Biennial (2003), 'NeoHooDoo', PS1 Contemporary Art Centre, New York, The Menil Collection, Houston (2008), 'The New Décor', Hayward Gallery, London (2010), and the Allen Memorial Art Museum at Oberlin College (2014–15). Solo exhibitions include The New Museum of Contemporary Art, New York (1998), San Francisco Museum of Modern Art (1999 and 2005), Tate Britain, London (1999), Camden Arts Centre, London (2001), White Cube, London (2004), Tate Modern, London (2007), The 80's: A Topology (2007), and Inhotim, Centro de Arte Contemporânea, Belo Horizonte, (2008). From April 2010 through February 2013, the artist's installation "plegaria Muda" traveled to museums throughout Europe and South America, including MUAC, Mexico; Moderna Museet, Malmö and CAM Gulbenkian, Lisbon (2011); MAXXI Rome and Pinacoteca São Paulo (2012), the Museum of Contemporary Art, Chicago (2015), and the Solomon R. Guggenheim Museum. (2015); and Harvard Art Museums (2016).

== Recognition ==
- 1995 – Guggenheim Fellowship
- 2005 – The Ordway Prize, from the Penny McCall Foundation
- 2010 – Velázquez Visual Arts Prize
- 2014 – Hiroshima Art Prize
- 2016 – Inaugural Nasher Prize for Sculpture, Nasher Sculpture Center
- 2017 – Rolf Schock Prizes in Visual Arts
- 2019 – Nomura Art Award
- 2024 – Praemium Imperiale

== Analysis of individual artworks ==
Istanbul is an installation made up of 1,550 chairs stacked between two tall urban buildings. Salcedo's idea with this piece was to create what she called "a topography of war." She clarifies this by saying it is meant to "represent war in general and not a specific historical event". Salcedo is quoted saying "seeing these 1,550 wooden chairs piled high between two buildings in central Istanbul, I'm reminded of mass graves. Of anonymous victims. I think of both chaos and absence, two effects of wartime violence." Salcedo explains, "What I'm trying to get out of these pieces is that element that is common in all of us." "And in a situation of war, we all experience it in much the same way, either as victim or perpetrator. So I'm not narrating a particular story. I'm just addressing experiences." In 2007, four years after Salcedo's installation in Istanbul, another artist, Chinese dissident Ai Weiwei, used chairs to create a memory effect in his piece Fairytale. He installed the set of 1001 Ming and Qing dynasty chairs at Documenta 12 in Kassel, Germany, one chair for each of the 1001 Chinese travelers displaced. His piece focused on Chinese displacement, a similar topic to Salcedo.

Atrabiliarios is an installation that incorporates plywood, shoes, animal fiber, thread, and sheepskin all in six different niches. In her piece old shoes, in pairs and singles, are encased behind sheets of translucent animal skin inside alcoves or niches in the gallery wall. The skin is crudely stitched to the wall with medical sutures. On the floor underneath are some small boxes made from the same animal skin. The worn shoes all belonged to women who 'disappeared', and were donated to Salcedo by the victims' families. The use of these shoes in Atrabiliarios is meant to echo the memory of those whose fate and whereabouts is unknown. Salcedo describes this a being "permanently suspended between the present and the past". Therefore, Atrabiliarios is "not only a portrait of disappearance, but a portrait of the survivors' mental condition of uncertainty, longing and mourning." Salcedo is seeking not only to express the horror of violence but also to investigate the way people prevail in times of torture, repairing their physical and psychological wounds, as well as raising resistance and remembering those who are missing.

Shibboleth was her Turbine Hall installation at Tate Modern in London. Salcedo was the first artist to change the physical building. Salcedo used this piece to give voice to the victims of all the injustices that have separated people and armed them against one another. Rather than fill Turbine Hall with an installation, she opened up a subterranean wound in the floor that stretched the entire length of the former power station. The concrete walls of the crevice were ruptured by a steel mesh fence, creating a tension between elements that resisted each other and at the same time depended on one another. The installation began as a thin, almost invisible line at the main entrance and gradually widened into a chasm at the far end. This design was meant to evoke the brokenness and separateness of post-colonial cultures especially in her homeland of Colombia. Shibboleth raised questions about the interaction of ideological foundations on which Western notions of modernity are built and questions about racism and colonialism that underlie the modern world. "The history of racism," Salcedo said, "runs parallel to the history of modernity and is its untold dark side." With Shibboleth, Salcedo focused attention on the existence of a large, socially excluded underclass present in all societies. Salcedo said that breaking open the floor of Turbine Hall symbolized the fracture in modernity itself. This urged viewers to confront uncomfortable truths about history and people. The crack also represented the divide between rich and poor, which can start off relatively little but ultimately turn into a great divide that is capable of dismantling cultures. The crack was made whole at the conclusion of the show, yet there is a sliver that will always be there in the flooring.

Flor de Piel is a room-sized installation first publicly exhibited at the Harvard Art Museums in Salcedo's 2016-2017 solo exhibition, Doris Salcedo: The Materiality of Mourning. A Flor de Piel, measuring 340 cm x 500 cm, is a tapestry of thousands of preserved, hand-sewn red rose petals, that undulates softly on the floor. Suspended in a state of transformation, the petals linger between life and death and are so vulnerable that they tear if touched. The artist intended the work to be a shroud for a nurse who was tortured to death in the Colombian war. Salcedo created the piece in 2013, working with rose petals and thread as her materials; A Flor de Piel was acquired by the Harvard Art Museums in 2014.

Plegaria Muda is a series of sculptures, each composed of two hand-crafted tables, which are approximately the same shape and size of a coffin. One table lies upside down on the other, with an earthlike layer with grass growing between the two table tops. "Plegaria Muda" translates roughly to "silent prayer", and is a comment on the relationships between the perpetrators of gang violence and their victims, as well as a homage to the mass grave sites In Colombia where victims of gang violence are often buried.

== Current research and themes ==
Since 1988 Salcedo has interviewed people whose relatives have been "disappeared" by presumably order of the military associated with Colombia's civil war and illegal drug trade. She regularly visits abandoned villages, murder sites, and mass graves. Salcedo reports that she has been doing much of the same research for many years with only small variations. For many years she kept files on concentration camps, these included both historical and more contemporary camps. She is most interested in how they vary from one another because they are always there just presented in different forms. Salcedo states that her one focus has always been political violence and that "violence defines the evils of our society."

"I was amazed when Guantanamo was opened in Cuba, because Cuba was the first place that had a concentration camp. Actually it was a Spanish invention. A Spanish general, Martinez Campos, thought it up in 1896. At that time they implemented it in Cuba. It's amazing to see how it has come full circle. Now you have Guantanamo again in Cuba. But of course the British had it at the end of the nineteenth century in South Africa. Then the Germans had it in West Africa. Then you have killing fields, forced labor camps, gulags—the list is endless. I have come to the conclusion that the industrial prison system in the United States has many of these elements, where people, for really no reason, for possession of marijuana or things like that are going to jail, where some minor crimes have become felonies. I'm really shocked by the sheer numbers of people being thrown into jails. And also I think it's amazing how this system, being in jail and then going out, has so many collateral effects that a fairly large portion of the population are not allowed to be alive. The idea of having a large portion of the population excluded from civil rights, from many, many possibilities, implies that you have people that can almost be considered socially dead. What does it mean to be socially dead? What does it mean to be alive and not able to participate? It's like being dead in life. That's what I am researching now, and that is the perspective I have been looking at events from for a long time."

== See also ==
- Andreas Huyssen
- Dario Robleto
