= London English =

London English is any accent or variety of English spoken in London that may refer to:

- Cockney, a dialect traditionally spoken by working-class Londoners, and especially in the East End
- Estuary English, a dialect spoken along the River Thames and its estuary, not to be confused with Cockney
- Multicultural London English, an ethnolect spoken by young working-class people in London
- Received Pronunciation, an accent associated with upper-class people in Southern England
