= Southern accent (United States) =

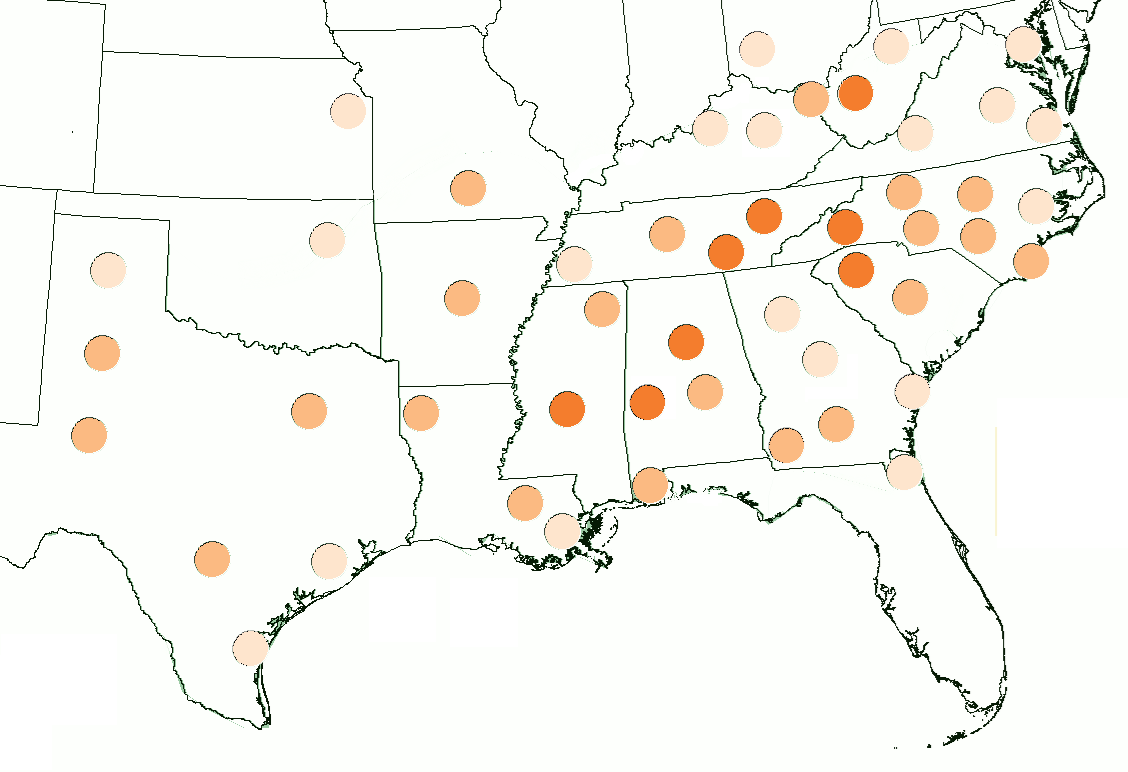
Based upon the 2006 Atlas of North American English, the darkest color indicates major cities with a high degree of Southern accent features, the medium color those with a middling degree, and the lightest color those with a low degree. Rural areas were not studied.

George W. Bush speaking
An example of a Texas-raised man with a rhotic accent (George W. Bush)

Bill Clinton speaking
An example of an Arkansan man with a rhotic accent (Bill Clinton)

Jimmy Carter speaking
An example of a Georgian man with a non-rhotic accent (Jimmy Carter)

In the United States, a Southern accent, Southern twang, or simply Southern is the sound system of the modern Southern regional dialect of American English. The Southern drawl is another common synonym, though technically defined as a particular feature within this accent.

English in the American South underwent several major sound changes from the late 19th century to the middle of the 20th century, during which a rural-originating sound system, including two chain shifts of vowel sounds, expanded geographically through the whole region. This regional accent is fairly unified, contrasting with the more diverse and localized sound systems of earlier 19th-century Southern dialects. Still, there remains ongoing variation in the Southern accent regarding various potential differences based on a speaker's exact sub-region, age, ethnicity, and other social factors. Some sub-regions of the South, and perhaps even a majority of its biggest cities, are showing a gradual shift away from the accent since roughly the 1950s.

== General modern phonology ==
=== Southern Vowel Shift ===
The Southern Vowel Shift is a chain shift of vowels that is occurring or fully completed in most Southern accents, especially those of speakers born in the 20th century; the urban areas where it is documented at the most advanced stage includes in the "Inland South" (i.e. an Appalachian region away from both the Gulf and Atlantic Coasts) as well as much of central and northern Texas. This 3-stage chain movement of vowels is first triggered by Stage 1 which dominates the entire Southern region, followed by Stage 2 which covers almost all of that area, and Stage 3 which is concentrated only in speakers of the two aforementioned core sub-regions.

- Stage 1 (/aɪ/ → [aː]):
  - The starting point, or first stage, of the Southern Shift, is the transition of the diphthong /aɪ/ toward a "glideless" long vowel [aː], so that, for example, the word ride commonly approaches a sound that most other American English speakers would hear as rod or rad. Stage 1 is now complete for a majority of Southern dialects. Southern speakers particularly exhibit the Stage 1 shift at the ends of words and before voiced consonants, but not as commonly before voiceless consonants, where the diphthong instead may retain its glide, so that ride is [ɹaːd], but right is [ɹaɪt]. Inland (i.e. non-coastal) Southern speakers, however, indeed delete the glide of /aɪ/ in all contexts, as in the stereotyped pronunciation "nahs whaht rahss" for nice white rice; these most Shift-advanced speakers are largely found today in an Appalachian area that comprises eastern Tennessee, western North Carolina, and northern Alabama, as well as in central Texas. Certain traditional East Coast Southern accents do not exhibit this Stage 1 glide deletion, particularly in Charleston, South Carolina, as well as Atlanta and Savannah, Georgia (cities that are, at best, considered marginal to the modern Southern dialect region).
  - Stage 1 may have begun in a minority of Southern accents as early as the first half of the 19th century with a glide weakening of /aɪ/ to [aɛ] or [aə]; however, it was still largely incomplete or absent in the mid-19th century, before expanding rapidly from the last quarter of the 19th into the middle of the 20th century. This glide weakening was perceived as a stereotypical feature of the South by the 1920s, and the 2006 Atlas of North American English describes glide weakening or even total glide deletion, [aː], as the pronunciation norm throughout all of the Southern States.
  - Somewhere in "the early stages of the Southern Shift", /æ/ (as in trap or bad) moves generally higher and fronter in the mouth (often also giving it a complex gliding quality, starting higher and then gliding lower); thus /æ/ can range variously away from its original position, with variants such as [æ(j)ə̯], [æɛ̯æ̯], [ɛ(j)ə̯], and possibly even [ɛ] for those born between the World Wars. An example is that, to other English speakers, the Southern pronunciation of yap sounds something like yeah-up or even yay-up. (See Southern drawl.)
- Stage 2 (/eɪ/ → [ɛɪ] and /ɛ/ → [e(j)ə]):
  - By removing the existence of [aɪ], Stage 1 leaves open a lower space for /eɪ/ (as in name and day) to occupy, causing Stage 2: the dragging of the diphthong /eɪ/ into a lower starting position, towards [ɛɪ] or to a sound even lower or more retracted, or both.
    - At the same time, the pushing of /æ/ into the vicinity of /ɛ/ (as in red or belt), forces /ɛ/ itself into a higher and fronter position, occupying the [e] area (previously the vicinity of /eɪ/). /ɛ/ also often acquires an in-glide: thus, [e(j)ə]. An example is that, to other English speakers, the Southern pronunciation of yep sounds something like yip or even yee-yup. Stage 2 is most common in heavily stressed syllables. Southern accents originating from cities that formerly had the greatest influence and wealth in the South (Richmond, Virginia; Charleston, South Carolina; Atlanta, Macon, and Savannah, Georgia; and all of Florida) do not traditionally participate in Stage 2.
- Stage 3 (/i/ → [ɪi] and /ɪ/ → [iə]): By the same pushing and pulling domino effects described above, /ɪ/ (as in hit or lick) and /i/ (as in beam or meet) follow suit by both possibly becoming diphthongs whose nuclei switch positions. /ɪ/ may be pushed into a diphthong with a raised beginning, [iə], while /i/ may be pulled into a diphthong with a lowered beginning, [ɪi]. An example is that, to other English speakers, the Southern pronunciation of fin sounds something like fee-in. Like the other stages of the Southern Shift, Stage 3 is most common in heavily stressed syllables and particularly among Inland Southern speakers.

=== Back Upglide Shift ===
The vowel /aʊ/, as in loud or now, shifts forward and upward to [æʊ] (also possibly realized, variously, as [æjə~æo~ɛɔ~eo]), thus allowing the back vowel /ɔ/, as in thought or hawk, to fill an area similar to the former position of /aʊ/ in the mouth, becoming lowered and developing an upglide [ɑɒ]. This, in turn, allows (though only for the most advanced Southern speakers) the upgliding vowel /ɔɪ/, as in choice or boy, to lose its glide and become [ɔ], particularly before /l/ (for instance, causing the word boils to sound something like the British or New York City pronunciations of balls).

=== Southern drawl ===
Southern vowel breaking, popularly known as a Southern drawl, is the pronunciation of the short front pure vowels as gliding vowels, making one-syllable words sound as if they might have two syllables. Thus, pet and pit may sound to other English speakers more like pay-it and pee-it. All three stages of the Southern Shift appear to be related to this phenomenon.

The "short a", "short e", and "short i" vowels are all affected, developing a glide up from their original starting position to [j], and then often back down to a schwa vowel: /æ/ → [æjə~ɛjə]; /ɛ/ → [ɛjə~ejə]; and /ɪ/ → [ɪjə~ijə], respectively. Appearing mostly after the mid-19th century, this phenomenon is on the decline, being most typical of Southern speakers born before 1960.

=== Other vowel features ===
- Lacking or transitioning cot–caught merger: The historical distinction between the two vowels sounds /ɔ/ and /ɑ/, in words like caught and cot or stalk and stock is mainly preserved, though the exact articulation is distinct from most other English dialects. In much of the South during the 20th century, there was a trend to lower the vowel found in words like stalk and caught, often with an upglide, so that the most common result is roughly the gliding vowel [ɑɒ]. However, the cot–caught merger is becoming increasingly common throughout the United States, affecting Southeastern and even some Southern dialects, towards a merged vowel [ɑ]. In the South, this merger, or a transition towards this merger, is especially documented in central, northern, and (particularly) western Texas.

The merger of pin and pen in the U.S. In the purple areas, the merger is complete for most speakers. Note the exclusion of the New Orleans region, Southern Florida, and the Lowcountry region of South Carolina and Georgia. The purple area in California consists of the Bakersfield and Kern County area, where migrants from the Southern States settled during the Dust Bowl.

- Pin–pen merger: the vowel phonemes /ɛ/ and /ɪ/ now merge before nasal consonants, so that pen and pin, for instance, or hem and him, are pronounced the same, as pin or him, respectively. The merger, which is roughly towards the sound [ɪ], is still unreported among some vestigial varieties of the older South, and other geographically Southern U.S. varieties that have eluded the Southern Vowel Shift, such as the Yat dialect of New Orleans or the anomalous dialect of Savannah, Georgia.
- Lax and tense vowels often neutralize before /l/, making pairs like feel–fill and fail–fell homophones for speakers in some areas of the South. Some speakers may distinguish between the two sets of words by reversing the normal vowel sound, e.g., feel in Southern may sound like fill, and vice versa.
- The back vowel /u/ (in goose or true) is fronted in the mouth to the vicinity of [ʉ] or even farther forward, which is then followed by a slight gliding quality; different gliding qualities have been reported, including both backward and (especially in the eastern half of the South) forward glides.
- The back vowel /oʊ/ (in goat or toe) is fronted to the vicinity of [əʊ~əʉ], and perhaps even as far forward as [ɛʊ].
  - Certain words ending in unstressed /oʊ/ (especially with the spelling ⟨ow⟩) may be pronounced as [ə] or [ʊ], making yellow sound like yella or tomorrow like tomorra.
- The vowel /ʌ/, as in bug, luck, strut, etc., is realized as [ɜ], occasionally fronted to [ɛ̈] or raised in the mouth to [ə].
- Phonemic incidence is sometimes unique in the South, so that:
  - Florida is typically pronounced /ˈflɑrɪdə/ (particularly along the East Coast) rather than General American /ˈflɔrɪdə/, and lawyer is /ˈlɔ.jər/ rather than General American /ˈlɔɪ.ər/ (i.e., the first syllable of lawyer sounds like law, not loy).
  - The suffixed, unstressed -day in words like Monday and Sunday is commonly /di/.
- Lacking or incomplete happy tensing: unstressed, word-final /ɪ/ (the second vowel sound in words like happy, money, Chelsea, etc.) may continue to be lax, unlike the tensed (higher and fronter) vowel [i] typical throughout rest of the United States. The South maintains a sound not always tensed: [ɪ] or [ɪ~i].
- Unstressed, word-final /ŋ/ → [n]: As with many nonstandard accents of English worldwide, the phoneme /ŋ/ in an unstressed syllable at the end of a word fronts to [n], so that singing /ˈsɪŋɪŋ/ is sometimes written phonetically as singin [ˈsɪŋɪn].
- Variable horse–hoarse merger: the merger of the phonemes /ɔr/ (as in morning) and /oʊr/ (as in mourning) is common, as in most English dialects, though a distinction is still preserved especially in Southern accents along the Gulf Coast, plus scatterings elsewhere; thus, morning [ˈmɒɹnɪn] versus mourning [ˈmouɹnɪn].

=== Table of vowels ===
A list of typical Southern vowels
English diaphoneme	Southern phoneme	Example words
Pure vowels (monophthongs)
/æ/	[æ~æɛ̯æ̯~æjə̯]	act, pal, trap
/æ/	[æjə̯~eə̯]	ham, land, yeah
/ɑː/	[ɑ]	blah, lava, father, bother, lot, top
/ɒ/	[ɑ]	blah, lava, father, bother, lot, top
/ɔː/	[ɑɒ̯~ɑ] (older: [ɔo̯~ɑɒ̯])	off, loss, dog, all, bought, saw
/ə/	[ə]	about, syrup, arena
/ɛ/	[ɛ~ɛjə̯]	dress, met, bread
/ɛ/	[ɪ~ɪjə̯~iə̯] (Note: /ɛ/ and /ɪ/ are merged before nasal consanants due to the pin–pen merger.)	pen, gem, tent, pin, hit, tip
/ɪ/	[ɪ~ɪjə̯~iə̯]	pen, gem, tent, pin, hit, tip
/iː/	[i̞i̯~ɪi̯]	beam, chic, fleet
/ʌ/	[ɜ]	bus, flood, what
/ʊ/	[ʊ̈~ʏ]	book, put, should
/uː/	[ʊu̯~ʉ̞u̯~ɵu̯~ʊ̈y̯~ʏy̯]	food, through, do
/uː/	[ʊu̯~ʉ̞u̯~ɵu̯~ʊ̈y̯~ʏy̯], [ɪʊ̯~ɪy̯]	glue, rude, lewd
/juː/	[ʊu̯~ʉ̞u̯~ɵu̯~ʊ̈y̯~ʏy̯], [ɪʊ̯~ɪy̯]	due, tune, new
/juː/	[jʊu̯~jʉ̞u̯~jɵu̯~jʊ̈y̯~jʏy̯], [ɪʊ̯~ɪy̯]	hue, cute, view
Diphthongs
/aɪ/	[aː~aɛ̯]	ride, shine, try
/aɪ/	([aɛ̯~aɪ̯~ɐi̯])	bright, dice, psych
/aʊ/	[æɒ̯~ɛjɔ̯]	now, ouch, scout
/eɪ/	[ɛi̯~æ̠i̯]	lake, paid, rein
/ɔɪ/	[oi̯]	boy, choice, moist
/oʊ/	[əʊ̯~əʊ̯̈~əʏ̯]	goat, road, most
/oʊ/	[ɔu̯] (Note: preceding /l/ or a hiatus)	goal, bold, showing
R-colored vowels
/ɑːr/	rhotic Southern dialects: [ɒɹ~ɑɹ] non-rhotic Southern dialects: [ɒ~ɑ]	barn, car, park
/ɛər/	rhotic: [eɹ~ɛ(j)əɹ] non-rhotic: [ɛ(j)ə̯]	bare, bear, there
/ɜːr/	[ɚ~ɐɹ] (older: [ɜ])	burn, first, herd
/ər/	rhotic: [ɚ] non-rhotic: [ə]	better, martyr, doctor
/ɪər/	rhotic: [i(j)əɹ] non-rhotic: [iə̯]	fear, peer, tier
/ɔːr/	rhotic: [ɔɹ~o(u̯)ɹ] non-rhotic: [ɔə̯]	horse, born, north
/ɔːr/	rhotic: [o(u̯)ɹ] non-rhotic: [o(u̯)ə̯]	hoarse, force, pork
/ʊər/	rhotic: [uɹ~əɹ] non-rhotic: [uə̯]	poor, sure, tour
/jʊər/	rhotic: [juɹ~jɚ] non-rhotic: [juə̯]	cure, Europe, pure

=== Consonant features ===
- Rhoticity: The "dropping" of the r sound after vowels was historically widespread in the South, particularly in former plantation areas. This phenomenon, non-rhoticity, was considered prestigious before World War II, after which the social perception in the South reversed. Now, full rhoticity (sometimes called r-fulness), in which most or all r sounds are pronounced, is dominant throughout most of the South, and even "hyper-rhoticity" (articulation of a very distinctive /r/ sound), particularly among younger and female white Southerners. The sound quality of the Southern r is the "bunch-tongued r", produced by strongly constricting the root or the midsection of the tongue, or both. The only major exceptions are among African-American Southern English speakers and among some south Louisiana and Cajun speakers, who are variably non-rhotic.
- Pronunciation of ⟨wh⟩: Most of the U.S. has completed the wine–whine merger, but, in many Southern accents, particularly inland Southern accents, the phonemes /w/ and /hw/ remain distinct, so that pairs of words like wail and whale or wield and wheeled are not homophones.
- /z/ becomes [d] before /n/, for example [ˈwʌdn̩t] wasn't, [ˈbɪdnɪs] business, but hasn't may keep the [z] to avoid merging with hadn't.

=== Lexical stress distinctions ===
Many nouns are stressed on the first syllable that are stressed on the second syllable in most other accents of English, such as police, cement, Detroit, Thanksgiving, insurance, behind, display, hotel, motel, recycle, TV, guitar, July, and umbrella. Today, younger Southerners tend to keep this initial stress only for a more reduced set of words, perhaps including only insurance, defense, Thanksgiving, and umbrella.

== Distinct modern phonologies ==
=== Inland South and Texas ===
Linguist William Labov et al. identify the "Inland South" as a large linguistic sub-region of the South located mostly in southern Appalachia: specifically the cities of Greenville, South Carolina; Asheville, North Carolina; Knoxville and Chattanooga, Tennessee; and Birmingham and Linden, Alabama. The Inland South, inland from both the Gulf and Atlantic Coasts, is the originating region of the Southern Vowel Shift. The Inland South, along with the "Texas South" (an urban core of central Texas: Dallas, Abilene, Lubbock, and Odessa) are considered the two major locations in which the Southern regional sound system is the most highly developed: the most advanced areas of the current-day South as a distinct dialect region.

The accents of Texas are diverse; however, much of the state is still an unambiguous region of modern rhotic Southern speech, strongest in the cities of Dallas, Lubbock, Odessa, and San Antonio, which all firmly demonstrate the first stage of the Southern Shift, if not also further stages of the shift. Texan cities with distinctly "non-Southern" accents are also documented, such as Abilene and Austin; only marginally Southern are Houston, El Paso, and Corpus Christi. In western and northern Texas, the cot–caught merger is very close to completed, unlike the traditional Southern core region.

=== Acadiana (Cajun) ===
Most of southern Louisiana constitutes Acadiana, a cultural region dominated for hundreds of years by monolingual speakers of Cajun French, which combines elements of Acadian French with other French and Spanish words. Today, this French dialect is spoken by many older Cajun ethnic group members and is said to be dying out. A related language, Louisiana Creole French, also exists. Since the early 1900s, Cajuns additionally began to develop their vernacular dialect of English, which retains some influences and words from French, such as "cher" (dear) or "nonc" (uncle). This dialect fell out of fashion after World War II but experienced a renewal among primarily male speakers born since the 1970s, who have been the most attracted by, and the biggest attractors of, a successful Cajun cultural renaissance. The accent includes:

- variable non-rhoticity (or r-dropping)
- high nasalization (including in vowels before nasal consonants)
- deletion of any word's final consonant(s) (hand becomes [hæ̃], food becomes [fu], rent becomes [ɹɪ̃], New York becomes [nuˈjɔə], etc.)
- a potential for glide weakening in all gliding vowels; for example, /oʊ/ (as in Joe), /eɪ/ (as in Jay), and /ɔɪ/ (as in Joy) have glides ([oː], [eː], and [ɔː], respectively)
- the cot–caught merger toward [ɑ̈]

Cajun English is not subject to the Southern Vowel Shift.

=== New Orleans ===
A separate historical English dialect from the above Cajun one, spoken only by those raised in the Greater New Orleans area, is traditionally non-rhotic and noticeably shares more pronunciation commonalities with a New York accent than with other Southern accents, due to commercial ties and cultural migration between the two cities. Since at least the 1980s, this local New Orleans dialect has popularly been called "Yat", from the common local greeting "Where you at?". Some features that the New York accent shares with the Yat accent include:

- variable non-rhoticity
- short-a raising (so that bad and back, for example, have different vowels)
- /ɔ/ as high gliding [ɔə̯]
- /ɑr/ as rounded [ɒ~ɔ]
- the coil–curl merger (traditionally, though now in decline).
- Canadian raising of both /aɪ/ and /aʊ/ (mainly among younger speakers)

Yat also lacks the typical vowel changes of the Southern Shift and the pin–pen merger that is commonly heard elsewhere throughout the South. Yat is associated with the working and lower-middle classes, and a spectrum of speech patterns with fewer notable Yat features is often heard among those of higher socioeconomic status; such New Orleans affluence is associated with the New Orleans Uptown and the Garden District, whose speech patterns are sometimes considered distinct from the lower-class Yat dialect.

=== Other Southern cities ===
Some sub-regions of the South, and perhaps even a majority of the biggest cities, are showing a gradual shift away from the Southern accent (toward a more Midland or General American accent) since the second half of the 20th century to the present. Such well-studied cities include Houston and Raleigh, North Carolina; in Raleigh, for example, this retreat from the accent appears to have begun around 1950.

Other sub-regions are unique in that their inhabitants have never spoken with the Southern regional accent, instead having their own distinct accents. The 2006 Atlas of North American English identifies Atlanta, Georgia, as a dialectal "island of non-Southern speech", Charleston, South Carolina, likewise as "not markedly Southern in character", and the traditional local accent of Savannah, Georgia, as "giving way to regional [Midland] patterns", despite these being three prominent Southern cities. The dialect features of Atlanta are best described today as sporadic from speaker to speaker, with such variation increased due to a huge movement of non-Southerners into the area during the 1990s. Modern-day Charleston speakers have leveled in the direction of a more generalized Midland accent (and speakers in other Southern cities too like Greenville, Richmond, and Norfolk), away from the city's now-defunct, traditional Charleston accent, whose features were "diametrically opposed to the Southern Shift... and differ in many other respects from the main body of Southern dialects". The Savannah accent is also becoming more Midland-like. The following vowel sounds of Atlanta, Charleston, and Savannah have been unaffected by typical Southern phenomena like the Southern drawl and Southern Vowel Shift:

- /æ/ as in bad (the "default" General American nasal short-a system is in use, in which /æ/ is tensed only before /n/ or /m/).
- /aɪ/ as in bide (however, some Atlanta and Savannah speakers do variably show Southern /aɪ/ glide weakening).
- /eɪ/ as in bait.
- /ɛ/ as in bed.
- /ɪ/ as in bid.
- /i/ as in bead.
- /ɔ/ as in bought (which is lowered, as in most of the U.S., and approaches [ɒ~ɑ]; the cot–caught merger is mostly at a transitional stage in these cities).

Today, the accents of Atlanta, Charleston, and Savannah are most similar to the Midland regional accent or at least the larger Southeastern super-regional accent. In all three cities, some speakers (though most consistently documented in Charleston and least consistently in Savannah) demonstrate the Southeastern fronting of /oʊ/ and the status of the pin–pen merger is highly variable. Non-rhoticity (r-dropping) is now rare in these cities, yet still documented in some speakers.

== Older phonologies ==
Before becoming a phonologically unified dialect region, the South was once home to an array of much more diverse accents at the local level. Features of the deeper interior Appalachian South largely became the basis for the newer Southern regional dialect; thus, older Southern American English primarily refers to the English spoken outside of Appalachia: the coastal and former plantation areas of the South, best documented before the Civil War, on the decline during the early 1900s, and non-existent in speakers born since the civil rights movement.

Little unified these older Southern dialects since they never formed a single homogeneous dialect region to begin with. Some older Southern accents were rhotic (most strongly in Appalachia and west of the Mississippi), while the majority were non-rhotic (most strongly in plantation areas); however, wide variation existed. Some older Southern accents showed (or approximated) Stage 1 of the Southern Vowel Shift—namely, the glide weakening of /aɪ/—however, it is virtually unreported before the very late 1800s. In general, the older Southern dialects lacked the Mary–marry–merry, cot–caught, horse–hoarse, wine–whine, full–fool, fill–feel, and do–dew mergers, all of which are now common to, or encroaching on, all varieties of present-day Southern American English. Older Southern sound systems included those local to the:

- Plantation South (excluding the Lowcountry): phonologically characterized by /aɪ/ glide weakening, non-rhoticity (for some accents, including a coil–curl merger), and the Southern trap–bath split (a version of the trap–bath split unique to older Southern U.S. speech that causes words like lass [læs~læɛ̯æ̯s] not to rhyme with words like pass [pæe̯s]).
  - Eastern and central Virginia (often identified as the "Tidewater accent"): further characterized by Canadian raising and some vestigial resistance to the vein–vain merger.
- Lowcountry (of South Carolina and Georgia; often identified as the traditional "Charleston accent"): characterized by no /aɪ/ glide weakening, non-rhoticity (including the coil-curl merger), the Southern trap–bath split, Canadian raising, the cheer–chair merger, /eɪ/ pronounced as [e(ə̯)], and /oʊ/ pronounced as [o(ə̯)].
- Outer Banks and Chesapeake Bay (often identified as the "Hoi Toider accent"): characterized by no /aɪ/ glide weakening (with the on-glide strongly backed, unlike any other U.S. dialect), the card–cord merger, /aʊ/ pronounced as [aʊ̯~äɪ̯], and up-gliding of pure vowels especially before /ʃ/ (making fish sound almost like feesh and ash like aysh). It is the only dialect of the older South still extant on the East Coast, due to being passed on through generations of geographically isolated islanders.
- Appalachian and Ozark Mountains: characterized by strong rhoticity and a tor–tore–tour merger (which still exists in that region), the Southern trap–bath split, plus the original and most advanced instances of the Southern Vowel Shift now defining the whole South.
