= Phonological history of English consonants =

Sound changes

This article describes those aspects of the phonological history of English which concern consonants. The phonological history of English consonants involves major shifts from Old English to Modern English, characterized by cluster simplifications, palatalization, voicing changes, and loss of sounds. Influences from Old Norse and also from French introduced new sounds, while internal processes like assimilation and lenition streamlined the system, eventually creating the contemporary consonant inventory of English.

== Consonant clusters ==
=== H-cluster reductions ===
- Reduction of /hw/ – to /h/ in a few words (such as who), but usually to /w/, for the great majority of English speakers (so that whine comes to be pronounced the same as wine).
- Reduction of /hl/, /hr/ and /hn/, with the loss of the initial /h/ in Middle English.
- Reduction of /hj/ to /j/ in a few American and Irish dialects (so that hew is pronounced like yew).

=== Y-cluster reductions ===
- Yod-dropping – the elision of /j/ in certain clusters, depending on dialect (for example, RP has /j/ in new, while General American and Cockney do not).
- Yod-coalescence, whereby the clusters /dj/, /tj/, /sj/ and /zj/ become [dʒ], [tʃ], [ʃ] and [ʒ] respectively (for example, education is often pronounced as if it began "edge").

=== Other initial cluster reductions ===
- Reduction of /wr/ to /r/, in words like wrap, around the 17th century (there was also a reduction of /wl/ to /l/ in Middle English).
- Reduction of /kn/ and /ɡn/ to /n/, in words like knot and gnome, around the 17th century.
- S-cluster reduction, in some types of Caribbean English, where for example spit is pronounced pit.

=== Final cluster reductions ===
- NG-coalescence – reduction of the final cluster [ŋɡ] to [ŋ], in words like hang, which has occurred in all but a few English dialects.
- G-dropping – reduction of the final cluster [ŋɡ] to [n] in weak syllables, principally in the verb ending -ing, which has occurred in many English dialects, although not in the modern standard varieties.
- Reduction of /mb/ and /mn/ to /m/, in later Middle English, affecting words like lamb and column.
- Generalized final cluster reduction in African American Vernacular English (AAVE) and Caribbean English, where for example desk and hand may be pronounced "dess" and "han".

=== Other changes involving clusters ===
- Reduction of /ts/ to /s/ – a Middle English reduction that produced the modern sound of soft ⟨c⟩.
- Medial cluster reduction – elision of certain stops in medial clusters, such as the /t/ in postman.
- Insertion (epenthesis) of stops after nasals in certain clusters, for example making prince sound like prints, and dreamt rhyme with attempt.
- Assimilation of certain consonants in clusters, especially nasals.
- Glottalization and pre-glottalization (insertion of a glottal stop in place of or before a /t/ or other stop) in certain environments, depending on dialect.
- Certain other changes occurring in AAVE, including S-cluster metathesis (as with the use of "aks" for ask – an alternation which also has a long history in general forms of English), the merger of /str/ and /skr/, and yod-rhotacization (where beautiful is pronounced "brootiful").

== Stops ==
=== Aspiration ===
The voiceless stops /p/, /t/, /k/ are typically aspirated when they begin a stressed syllable, becoming [pʰ], [tʰ], [kʰ], as described under English phonology (obstruents). There is some regional variation in the degree of aspiration, and in some Scottish and northern English accents aspiration does not occur at all.

In certain accents, such as Geordie (among younger women) and in some speakers of Dublin English, /p/, /t/ and /k/ can be preaspirated when they come at the end of a word or utterance, becoming [ʰp], [ʰt], [ʰk].

=== Flapping ===
Flapping, or tapping, is a process whereby /t/ or /d/ is pronounced as the alveolar flap [ɾ] in certain positions, especially between vowels (but also sometimes after other sonorants). It may be perceived as, for example, the pronunciation of butter as "budder". It occurs especially in North American English (to varying extents) and in Australian and New Zealand English.

=== Voicing ===
Apart from the T-voicing that results from flapping (described above), some dialects feature other instances of voicing or lenition of the stops /p/, /t/ and /k/. In Geordie, these stops may be fully voiced ([b], [d], [ɡ]) in intervocalic position. In Devon, stops and other obstruents may be voiced (or at least lenited) between vowels and when final after a weak vowel, so for example the /k/ and /t/ in jacket may approach the realizations [ɡ] and [d], making the word sound similar or identical to jagged.

=== Glottalization ===
Stops, chiefly the voiceless stops, and especially /t/, are frequently glottalized or pre-glottalized in certain positions; that is, a stop may be replaced with the glottal stop [ʔ], or else a glottal stop may be inserted before it. These phenomena are strongly dependent on the phonetic environment and on dialect. For details, see T-glottalization, as well as English phonology (obstruents) and glottalization in consonant clusters.

If all final voiceless stops are glottalized, as may occur in some London speech, then sets of words such as lick, lit and lip may become homophones, pronounced [lɪʔ].

== Fricatives and affricates ==
=== H-dropping and H-insertion ===
H-dropping is the omission of initial /h/ in words like house, heat and hangover. It is common in many dialects, especially in England, Wales, Australia and Jamaica, but is generally stigmatized, and is not a feature of the standard accents. The /h/ is nonetheless frequently dropped in all forms of English in the weak forms of function words like he, him, her, his, had and have. The opposite of H-dropping, called H-insertion or H-adding, may arise as a hypercorrection by typically H-dropping speakers, or as a spelling pronunciation.

=== Loss of velar and palatal fricatives ===
The voiceless velar and palatal fricative sounds [x] and [ç], considered to be allophones of /h/ and reflected by the ⟨gh⟩ in the spelling of words such as night, taught and weight, were lost in later Middle English or in Early Modern English. Their loss was accompanied by certain changes in the previous vowels. In some cases [x] became /f/, as in laugh.

A /x/ is still heard in words of the above type in certain Scots and northern English traditional dialect speech. A /x/ is more commonly heard, especially in the Celtic countries but also for many speakers elsewhere, in the word loch and in certain proper names such as Buchan.

Alexander John Ellis reported use of [x] in England on the Yorkshire-Lancashire border and close to the Scottish border in the late nineteenth century.

For details of the above phenomena, see H-loss (Middle English). See also the vocalization of the voiced velar fricative [ɣ].

=== Voiced/voiceless splits ===
The Old English fricatives /f, θ, s/ had voiceless and voiced allophones, the voiced forms occurring in certain environments, such as between vowels, and in words originating from the Kentish dialect (like vane, vinew, vixen, and zink), word-initially. In Early Middle English, partly by borrowings from French, they split into separate phonemes: /f, v, θ, ð, s, z/. See Middle English phonology – Voiced fricatives.

Also in the Middle English period, the voiced affricate /dʒ/ took on phonemic status. (In Old English, it is considered to have been an allophone of /j/). It occurred in Middle English not only in words like brigge ("bridge") in which it had been present in Old English but also in French loanwords like juge ("judge") and general.

After the Middle English period, a fourth voiced fricative, /ʒ/, developed as a phoneme (alongside the voiceless /ʃ/). It arose from yod-coalescence (/zj/→/ʒ/) in words like measure, and from late French loanwords like rouge and beige.

=== Dental fricatives ===
As noted above, the Old English phoneme /θ/ split into two phonemes in early Middle English: a voiceless dental fricative /θ/ and a voiced dental fricative /ð/. Both continued to be spelt ⟨th⟩.

Certain English accents feature variant pronunciations of these sounds. These include fronting, where they merge with /f/ and /v/ (found in Cockney and some other dialects); stopping, where they approach /t/ and /d/ (as in some Irish speech); alveolarisation, where they become /s/ and /z/ (in some African varieties); and debuccalisation, where /θ/ becomes [h] before a vowel (found in some Scottish English).

=== Initial fricative voicing ===
The initial consonant in the word finger in traditional dialects of England.

Initial fricative voicing is a process that occurs in some traditional accents of the English West Country, where the fricatives /f/, /θ/, /s/ and /ʃ/ are voiced to [v], [ð], [z] and [ʒ] when they occur at the beginning of a word. (Words beginning /θr/, like three, develop /dr/ instead.) In these accents, sing and farm are pronounced [zɪŋ] and [vɑːɻm]. The phenomenon is well known as a stereotypical feature, but is now rare in actual speech. Some such pronunciations have spread from these dialects to become standard usage: the words vane, vat and vixen all had initial /f/ in Old English (fana, fæt, fyxen).

A similar phenomenon occurred in both German and Dutch.

Homophonous pairs
| voiceless | voiced | IPA | |
|---|---|---|---|
| fail | vale | ˈvɛɪl | |
| fail | veil | ˈvɛɪl | |
| fairy | vary | ˈvɛəri | |
| fan | van | ˈvæn | |
| fast | vast | ˈvæst | |
| fat | vat | ˈvæt | |
| fault | vault | ˈvɔːlt | |
| fear | veer | ˈvɪər | |
| fecks | vex | ˈvɛks | |
| fee | vee | ˈviː | |
| feel | veal | ˈviːl | |
| feeler | velar | ˈviːlər | |
| fend | vend | ˈvɛnd | |
| ferry | very | ˈvɛri | |
| fetch | vetch | ˈvɛtʃ | |
| fetter | vetter | ˈvɛtər | |
| fest | vest | ˈvɛst | |
| few | view | ˈvjuː | |
| fie | vie | ˈvaɪ | |
| figure | vigour | ˈvɪɡər | |
| file | vial | ˈvaɪl | With vile-vial merger. |
| file | vile | ˈvaɪl | |
| fill | vill | ˈvɪl | |
| final | vinyl | ˈvaɪnəl | |
| fine | vine | ˈvaɪn | |
| fizz | viz. | ˈvɪz | |
| focal | vocal | ˈvoʊkəl | |
| foist | voiced | ˈvɔɪst | |
| folly | volley | ˈvɒli | |
| foul | vowel | ˈvaʊl | With vile-vial merger. |
| fowl | vowel | ˈvaʊl | With vile-vial merger. |
| fox | vox | ˈvɑks | |
| sag | zag | ˈzæɡ | |
| said | zed | ˈzɛd | |
| sane | Zane | ˈzeɪn | |
| sap | zap | ˈzæp | |
| sax | zax | ˈzæks | |
| scene | zine | ˈziːn | |
| sea | zee | ˈziː | |
| seal | zeal | ˈziːl | |
| see | zee | ˈziː | |
| seen | zine | ˈziːn | |
| seine | Zane | ˈzeɪn | |
| seize | zees | ˈziːz | |
| sewn | zone | ˈzoʊn | |
| sing | zing | ˈzɪŋ | |
| sink | zinc | ˈzɪŋk | |
| Sioux | zoo | ˈzuː | |
| sip | zip | ˈzɪp | |
| sit | zit | ˈzɪt | |
| sone | zone | ˈzoʊn | |
| sown | zone | ˈzoʊn | |
| thigh | thy | ˈðaɪ | |
| thou (thousand(th)) | thou (you) | ˈðaʊ | |
| thrall | drawl | ˈdrɔːl | |
| thread | dread | ˈdrɛd | |
| threw | drew | ˈdruː | |
| throne | drone | ˈdroʊn | |
| through | drew | ˈdruː | |
| thrown | drone | ˈdroʊn | |
| thrift | drift | ˈdrɪft | |
| thrive | drive | ˈdraɪv | |
| thriven | driven | ˈdrɪvən | |
| throve | drove | ˈdroʊv | |

=== Other changes ===
- In Glasgow and some other urban Scottish accents, /s/ is given an apico-alveolar articulation, which auditorily gives an impression of a retracted pronunciation similar to /ʃ/. Confusion between /ʃ/ and /s/ (or /tʃ/) occurs in some African varieties of English, so ship may be pronounced like sip (or chip). In Zulu English, it is reported that /tʃ/ is sometimes replaced by /ʃ/.
- The labiodental fricative /v/ is sometimes merged with the corresponding bilabial stop /b/. Some speakers of Caribbean English and Mexican American English merge /v/ with /b/, making ban and van homophones (pronounced as [ban], or as [βan] with a bilabial fricative). The distinction of /v/ from /b/ is one of the last phonological distinctions commonly learnt by English-speaking children generally, and pairs like dribble/drivel may be pronounced similarly even by adults.
- In Indian English, /v/ is often pronounced like /w/, sounded as [w] or as a labiodental approximant [ʋ]. Some Indian speakers make various changes in the pronunciation of other fricatives: /z/ may become [dʒ] or [dz]; /ʃ/ may become [s] or [sj]; /ʒ/ may become [ʃ], [z] or [dʒ], /dʒ/ may become [z] or [dz]; /tʃ/ may become [ts]; /f/ may become a bilabial [ɸ] or an aspirated stop [pʰ]. For /θ/ and /ð/, see th-stopping.
- For some speakers of Mexican American English, initial /dʒ/ and /j/ may be used in place of each other, so jet may be pronounced as yet or vice versa.
- In Indian South African English, the typical realization of the labiodental fricatives /f, v/ are the approximants [ʋ̥, ʋ].

== Approximants ==
=== Insertion and deletion of /j/ and /w/ ===
In parts of the west and southwest of England, initial /w/ may be dropped in words like wool and woman; occasionally, though, a /w/ may be inserted before certain vowels, as in "wold" for old and "bwoiling" for boiling. Similarly, initial /j/ may be lost in words like yeast and yes (this has also been reported in parts of eastern England), and may be added in words like earth (making "yearth").

For the much more widespread deletion of /j/ in consonant clusters, see yod-dropping (and compare also yod-coalescence and yod-rhotacization). For the historical loss of /w/ in such words as who and write, see pronunciation of wh and reduction of /wr/.

=== Realizations of /r/ ===
Old and Middle English /r/ was historically pronounced as an alveolar trill, [r]. At some time between later Middle English and Early Modern English, it changed to an alveolar approximant, [ɹ], in the standard accents. Some Scottish speakers, however, retain the original trilled ("rolled") /r/.

Another possible realization of /r/ is the alveolar tap, [ɾ]. This is common (alongside [ɹ]) in Scotland, and is also found in certain other accents, chiefly in positions between vowels or between a consonant and a vowel – this occurs, for example, in some Liverpool English and in some upper-class RP (this should not be confused with the tap pronunciation of /t/ and /d/, found especially in North America).

In most General American, /r/ is [ɹ] before a vowel, but when not followed by a vowel is generally realized as an r-colored vowel, [ɚ], or as r-coloring on the preceding vowel. In many accents of English, including RP, /r/ is lost altogether when not followed by a vowel – for this, see rhoticity in English (and for related phenomena, linking and intrusive R). For vowel changes before /r/, see English-language vowel changes before historical /r/.

A uvular realization of /r/, the "Northumbrian burr", is used by some speakers in the far north of England.

A relatively recent innovation in the southeast of England, possibly originating from Cockney, is the use of a labiodental approximant, [ʋ], for /r/. To some listeners this can sound like a /w/.

=== Developments involving /l/ ===
Velarization of /l/ in positions where there is no vowel following, producing a "dark L", is a phenomenon that goes back to Old English times. Today there is much variation between dialects as regards the degree and distribution of this velarization; see English phonology (sonorants).

In Early Modern English, in many words in which a dark /l/ followed the vowel /a/ or /o/, the /l/ either disappeared or underwent vocalization, usually with some kind of diphthongization or compensatory lengthening of the preceding vowel. This affected:

- Words with final /al/ and /ol/, which underwent partial L-vocalization, with the insertion of [ʊ] between the vowel and the /l/. The resulting diphthongs developed respectively into modern /ɔː/ in words like all, ball, call, and into the GOAT vowel in words like poll, scroll and control. Some words of more recent origin did not undergo these changes, such as pal, doll and alcohol; the word shall is also unaffected.
- Words with /al/ and /ol/ followed by a coronal consonant, which followed the same pattern as those above, although here in Standard Southern British the /ɔː/ of the first set is mostly replaced by a short /ɒ/, as in words like salt, halt, falter, bald, false, Walsh. Words in the second set, having the GOAT vowel, include old, cold and bolt (though some RP speakers also have /ɒ/ in words like bolt). The word solder has a variety of pronunciations; in North America the /l/ is often dropped.
- Words with /alk/ and /olk/, which again followed the same pattern, but also dropped the /l/, so that words like chalk, talk and walk now have /ɔːk/, while folk and yolk rhyme with smoke.
- Words with /alf/ or /alv/ (calf, half, halve), which simply lost the /l/ (the vowel of these is now /æ/ in General American and /ɑː/ in RP, by BATH-broadening). The word salve is often pronounced with the /l/; the name Ralph may be /rælf/, /rɑːlf/, /rɑːf/ or /reɪf/. Words like solve were not affected, although golf dropped the /l/ in some British accents.
- Words with /alm/ and /olm/, which lost the /l/ and lengthened the vowel (the lengthened [oː] later becoming diphthongized in the toe–tow merger). Words like alms, balm, calm, Chalmers, qualm, palm and psalm now generally have /ɑː/ in the standard accents, while holm and Holmes are homophones of home(s). Some accents (including many of American English) have reintroduced the /l/ in these words as a spelling pronunciation. The word salmon generally retains a short vowel despite the loss of /l/.
- A few words with /alb/ or /olb/, such as Alban and Albany, which have developed to /ɔːl/ (though Albania usually has /æl/), and Holborn, which has the GOAT vowel and no /l/. Words like scalp and Alps are unaffected.

As noted under some of the points above, /l/ may be reintroduced in some of the words from which it has been lost, as a spelling pronunciation. This happens sometimes in Irish English, where for example Dundalk may be pronounced /dʌndɔːlk/ (in standard English the ⟨l⟩ is silent).

The /l/ has also been lost in the words would and should. The word could was never pronounced with /l/; its spelling results from analogy with the former words.

Modern L-vocalization (the replacement of "dark" /l/ with a non-syllabic vowel sound, usually similar to [ʊ] or [o]) is a feature of certain accents, particularly in London English and in near-RP speech that has been influenced by it ("Estuary English"), in some New York and Philadelphia speech, in the American South and African American Vernacular English, and in New Zealand English. Also in AAVE and some southern American accents, L-dropping may occur when the /l/ sound comes after a vowel and before a labial consonant in the same syllable, causing pronunciations like /hɛp/ for help and /sɛf/ for self.

In some accents around Bristol, "intrusive L" is found, where an /l/ is inserted at the end of words ending in schwa, like comma and idea. This is now somewhat stigmatized, but far from rare. The name Bristol itself was formerly Bristow.

In some modern English accents, significant pre-L breaking occurs when /l/ follows certain vowels (/iː/, /uː/, and diphthongs ending [ɪ] or [ʊ]). Here the vowel develops a centering offglide (an additional schwa) before the /l/. This may cause reel to be pronounced like real, and tile, boil and fowl to rhyme with dial, royal and vowel. Wells considers this breaking to be a feature of Midwestern and New York English. Similar pre-L schwa-insertion may also occur after /r/ (in rhotic accents), leading to pronunciations like /ˈwɜrəld/ for world.

== Sound changes involving final consonants ==
=== Final obstruent devoicing ===
Final obstruent devoicing is the full devoicing of final obstruents that occurs for some AAVE speakers in Detroit where obstruents are devoiced at the end of a word. The preceding length of the vowel is maintained when the final obstruents are devoiced in AAVE: [bɪːk] and [bæːt] for "big" and "bad".

Most varieties of English do not have full devoicing of final voiced obstruents, but voiced obstruents are partially devoiced in final position in English, especially when they are phrase-final or when they are followed by a voiceless consonant (for example, bad cat [bæd̥ kʰæt]). The most salient distinction between bad and bat is not the voicing of the final consonant but the duration of the vowel and the possible glottalization of final [t]: bad is pronounced [bæːd̥] while bat is [bæ(ʔ)t].

=== Final consonant deletion ===
Final consonant deletion is the nonstandard deletion of single consonants in syllable-final position occurring for some AAVE speakers resulting in pronunciations like:

- bad - [bæː]
- con - [kɑ̃]
- foot - [fʊ]
- five - [faɪ]
- good - [ɡʊː]

When final nasal consonants are deleted, the nasality is maintained on the preceding vowel. When voiced stops are deleted, the length of the preceding vowel is maintained. Consonants remaining from reduced final clusters may be eligible for deletion. The deletion occurs especially if the final consonant is a nasal or a stop. Final-consonant deletion is much less frequent than the more common final-cluster reduction.

Consonants can also be deleted at the end of a morpheme boundary, leading to pronunciations like [kɪːz] for kids.

== See also ==
- Phonological history of English
- Phonological history of English vowels
- Rhotic and non-rhotic accents
- L-vocalization
- Phonological history of wh

== Bibliography ==
- Watt, Dominic; Allen, William (2003), "Tyneside English", Journal of the International Phonetic Association, 33 (2): 267–271, doi:10.1017/S0025100303001397
- Wells, John C. (1982), Accents of English (3 vols.), Cambridge University Press.
