= Phonological history of English vowels =

Sound changes

In the history of English phonology, there have been many diachronic sound changes affecting vowels, especially involving phonemic splits and mergers.

== Great Vowel Shift and trisyllabic laxing ==
The Great Vowel Shift was a series of chain shifts that affected historical long vowels but left short vowels largely alone. It is one of the primary causes of the idiosyncrasies in English spelling.

The shortening of ante-penultimate syllables in Middle English created many long–short pairs. The result can be seen in such words as,

| Middle English | from long V | from short V |
|---|---|---|
| ī : i | child /aɪ/ divine mine | children /ɪ/ divinity mineral |
| ē : e ea : e | serene /iː/ dream | serenity /ɛ/ dreamt |
| ā : a | nation /eɪ/ sane | national /æ/ sanity |
| ō : o | goose /uː/ school | gosling /ɒ/ scholarly |
| oa : o ō : o (Latin) | holy /oʊ/ cone know* | holiday /ɒ/ conical knowledge |
| ū : u | south /aʊ/ pronounce | southern /ʌ/ pronunciation |

*Earlier Modern English /ou/ merged with /oː/ as a result of the toe-tow merger.

== Tense–lax neutralization ==
Tense–lax neutralization refers to a neutralization, in a particular phonological context in a particular language, of the normal distinction between tense and lax vowels.

In some varieties of English, this occurs in particular before /ŋ/ and (in rhotic dialects) before coda /r/ (that is, /r/ followed by a consonant or at the end of a word); it also occurs, to a lesser extent, before tautosyllabic /ʃ/.

In the Pacific Northwest, especially in the Seattle area, some speakers have a merger of /ɛ/ with /eɪ/ before /ɡ/. For these speakers, words with /ɛ/ like beg, egg, Greg, keg, leg and peg rhyme with words with /eɪ/ like Hague, plague and vague.

Some varieties (including most American English dialects) have significant vocalic neutralization before intervocalic /r/, as well. See English-language vowel changes before historical /r/.

== Monophthongs ==
=== Low front vowels ===
- /æ/ tensing is a process that occurs in some accents of North American and some Australian English whereby the vowel /æ/ is raised and lengthened or diphthongised in various environments. In some dialects it involves an allophonic split while in others it affects all /æ/s. There are dialects, however, where the split is phonological.
- The bad–lad split is a phonological split of the Early Modern English short vowel phoneme /æ/ into a short /æ/ and a long /æː/. This split is found in some varieties of English in England and Australia.
- In Modern English, a new phoneme, /ɑː/, developed that did not exist in Middle English.
- The trap–bath split is a vowel split whereby the Early Modern English phoneme /æ/ merged with the /ɑː/ in certain environments. It occurs mainly in southern varieties of English English, the Boston accent and the Southern Hemisphere accents (although it is somewhat variable in Australia).

=== Low back vowels ===
- The father–bother merger is a merger of the Early Modern English vowels /ɑː/ and /ɒ/ that occurs in almost all varieties of North American English.
- The lot–cloth split is the result of a late 17th-century sound change that lengthened /ɒ/ to [ɒː] before voiceless fricatives (off, broth, cost), voiced velars (dog, long) and also before /n/ in the word gone.
- The cot–caught merger is a phonemic merger that occurs in some varieties of English causing the vowel in words like cot, rock, and doll to be pronounced the same as the vowel in the words caught, talk, law, and small.
- The psalm–sum merger is a phenomenon occurring in Singaporean English where the phonemes /ɑ/ and /ʌ/ are both pronounced /ɑ/. In Australian English they are distinguished only by vowel length.
- The bud–bird merger is a merger of /ʌ/ and /ɜ/ occurring for some speakers of Jamaican English.

=== High back vowels ===
- The foot–goose merger is a phonemic merger of the vowels /ʊ/ and /uː/ found in distinct dialects of English: Scotland, Northern Ireland and the far north of England use /u/ for both these sets of words.
- The foot–strut split is the split of Middle English /ʊ/ into two distinct phonemes /ʊ/ (as in foot) and /ʌ/ (as in strut) that occurs in most accents of English (except most Northern English accents).
- The strut–comma merger is the merger of /ʌ/ and /ə/ found in Welsh English and in many varieties of General American.
- In Modern English, the vowels /iu/, /ɛu/, and /y/ (the last occurring only in French loanwords) of Middle English have been merged.

=== High front vowels ===
- The weak vowel merger is a phonemic merger of the unstressed /ɪ/ (sometimes written as /ɨ/) with /ə/ (schwa) with in certain dialects of English. As a result of this merger the words rabbit and abbot rhyme.
- The kit split is a split of EME /ɪ/ found in South African English, where kit [kɪt] and bit [bət] do not rhyme.
- The pin–pen merger is a conditional phonemic merger of /ɪ/ and /ɛ/ before the nasal consonants [m], [n] and [ŋ].
- Happy tensing is the process in which final lax [ɪ] becomes tense [i] in words like happy.
- The meet–meat merger is the merger of the Early Modern English vowel /eː/ with the vowel /iː/. The merger is complete outside the British Isles and virtually complete within them.
- The mitt–meet merger is a phenomenon occurring in Malaysian English and Singaporean English where the phonemes /iː/ and /ɪ/ are both pronounced /i/.
- The met–mat merger is a phenomenon occurring in Malaysian English and Singaporean English where the phonemes /ɛ/ and /æ/ are both pronounced /ɛ/.
- The next–text split is a vowel split occurring in Singaporean English where next /nekst/ and text /tɛkst/ use different vowel phonemes and do not rhyme.
- The met–mate merger is a phenomenon occurring for some speakers of Zulu English where /eɪ/ and /ɛ/ are both pronounced /ɛ/.
- The thank–think merger is the lowering of /ɪ/ to /æ/ before the velar nasal /ŋ/ that can be found in the speech of speakers of African American Vernacular English.
- The pit–pet merger is a complete merger of /ɪ/ and /ɛ/ – not restricted to positions before nasals – occurring for some speakers of Newfoundland English.

=== Schwa ===
Schwa syncope is the deletion of schwa. English has the tendency to delete schwa when it appears in a mid-word syllable that comes after the stressed syllable. Kenstowicz (1994) states that "... American English schwa deletes in medial posttonic syllables ...", and gives as examples words such as sep(a)rate (as an adjective), choc(o)late, cam(e)ra and elab(o)rate (as an adjective), where the schwa (represented by the letters in parentheses) has a tendency to be deleted.

== Diphthongs ==
- The vein–vain merger is the merger of the Middle English diphthongs /ei/ and /ai/ that occurs in all dialects of present English.
- The following mergers are grouped together by Wells as the long mid mergers. They occur in all but a few dialects of English.
  - The pane–pain merger is a merger of the long mid monophthong /eː/ and the diphthong /ɛi/.
  - The toe–tow merger is a merger of the Early Modern English vowels /oː/ and /ɔu/.
- The cot–coat merger is a phenomenon occurring for some speakers of Zulu English where the phonemes /ɒ/ and /oʊ/ are not distinguished.
- The rod–ride merger is a merger of /ɑ/ and /aɪ/ occurring for some speakers of African-American Vernacular English.
- The pride–proud merger is a merger of the diphthongs /aɪ/ and /aʊ/ before voiced consonants occurring for some speakers of African-American Vernacular English.
- The line–loin merger is a merger between the diphthongs /aɪ/ and /ɔɪ/ that occurs in some English dialects.
- The coil–curl merger is a merger of /ɔɪ/ and /ɜr/ which historically occurred in some dialects of English. It is particularly associated with the dialects of New York City and New Orleans.

== Vowel changes before historical /r/ ==
=== Mergers before intervocalic /r/ ===
Mergers before intervocalic r are quite widespread in North American English.

- The Mary–marry–merry merger is the merger of /ær/ and /ɛr/ with /ɛər/ (historic /eɪr/).
- The mirror–nearer merger is the merger of /ɪr/ with /ɪər/ (historic /iːr/).
- The hurry–furry merger is the merger of /ʌr/ with /ɜr/.
- The merry–Murray merger, common in the Philadelphia accent, is the merger of /ʌr/ with /ɛr/.
- Intervocalic /ɒr/ merges either with /ɑr/ as in starry or /ɔr/ as in glory.

=== Mergers before historical coda /r/ ===
Various mergers before historical coda r are very common in English dialects.

- The cheer–chair merger is the merger of the Early Modern English sequences [iːr] and [eːr], which is found in some accents of modern English.
- The fern–fir–fur merger is the merger of the Middle English vowels /ɪ, ɛ, ʊ/ into [ɜr] when historically followed by /r/ in the coda of the syllable.
- The fur–fair merger is a merger of /ɜːr/ with /ɛər/ that occurs in some accents.
- The nurse–near merger is a possible merger of /ɜːr/ with /ɪər/ that may occur in some American and the West Country English dialects.
- The /aɪər/–/aʊər/–/ɑːr/ merger is found in some accents of Southern British English. It causes tire, tower, and tar to be homophones. The /aɪər/–/ɑːr/ merger is found in some Midland and Southern U.S. accents. It causes tire and tar to be homophones.
- The cure–fir merger is a merger of /ʊər/ with /ɜːr/ or /ʊr/ with /ɜːr/ that occurs in East Anglian and American English in certain words.
- The pour–poor merger is the merger of /ʊər/ with /ɔːr/.
- The card–cord merger is a merger of Early Modern English [ɑːr] with [ɒr], found in some Caribbean, English West Country, and Southern and Western U.S. accents.
- The horse–hoarse merger is the merger of /ɔː/ and /oʊ/ before historic /r/ occurring in most varieties of English.
- The square–nurse merger occurs in some areas of England. The two sets are sometimes merged to /ɛː/ (Liverpool, east coast of Yorkshire) and sometimes to /ɜː/ (south Lancashire).
- The /aʊr/–/aʊər/ merger occurs for many speakers of English. It caused power and sour to rhyme.

== Vowel changes before historical /l/ ==
- The salary–celery merger is a conditioned merger of /æ/ and /e/ before /l/ occurring in New Zealand and Victorian (Australia) English.
- The fill–feel merger is a conditioned merger of /ɪ/ and /iː/ before /l/ occurring in some dialects of American English.
- The fell–fail merger is a conditioned merger of /ɛ/ and /eɪ/ before /l/ occurring in some varieties of Southern American English.
- The full–fool merger is a conditioned merger of /ʊ/ and /uː/ before /l/ mainly occurring the North Midland accent of American English.
- The hull–hole merger is a conditioned merger of /ʌ/ and /oʊ/ before /l/ occurring for some speakers of English English with l-vocalization.
- The doll–dole merger is a conditioned merger, for some Londoners, of /ɒ/ and /əʊ/ before nonprevocalic /l/.
- The vile–vial merger involves a partial or complete dephonologicalization of schwa after a vowel and before coda /l/.
- Three other conditioned mergers before /l/ which require more study have been mentioned in the literature and are as follows:
  - /ʊl/ and /oʊl/ (bull vs. bowl)
  - /ʌl/ and /ɔːl/ (hull vs. hall)
  - /ʊl/ and /ʌl/ (bull vs. hull)

== See also ==
- Great Vowel Shift
- List of dialects of English
- Phonological history of English
- Phonological history of English consonants
- Trisyllabic laxing
