= Phonological history of English close back vowels =

Sound changes

Most dialects of modern English have two close back vowels: the near-close near-back rounded vowel /ʊ/ found in words like foot, and the close back rounded vowel /uː/ (realized as central [ʉː] in many dialects) found in words like goose. The STRUT vowel /ʌ/, which historically was back, is often central [ɐ] as well. This article discusses the history of these vowels in various dialects of English, focusing in particular on phonemic splits and mergers involving these sounds.

== Historical development ==
The Old English vowels included a pair of short and long close back vowels, /u/ and /uː/, both written ⟨u⟩ (the longer vowel is often distinguished as ⟨ū⟩ in modern editions of Old English texts). There was also a pair of back vowels of mid-height, /o/ and /oː/, both of which were written ⟨o⟩ (the longer vowel is often ⟨ō⟩ in modern editions).

The same four vowels existed in the Middle English system. The short vowels were still written ⟨u⟩ and ⟨o⟩, but long /uː/ came to be spelt as ⟨ou⟩, and /oː/ as ⟨oo⟩. Generally, the Middle English vowels descended from the corresponding Old English ones, but there were certain alternative developments.

The Middle English open syllable lengthening caused short /o/ to be mostly lengthened to /ɔː/ (an opener back vowel) in open syllables, a development that can be seen in words like nose. During the Great Vowel Shift, Middle English long /oː/ was raised to /uː/ in words like moon; Middle English long /uː/ was diphthongised, becoming the present-day /aʊ/, as in mouse; and Middle English /ɔː/ of nose was raised and later diphthongized, leading to present-day /oʊ ~ əʊ/.

At some point, short /u/ developed into a lax, near-close near-back rounded vowel, /ʊ/, as found in words like put. (Similarly, short /i/ has become /ɪ/.) According to Roger Lass, the laxing occurred in the 17th century, but other linguists have suggested that it may have taken place much earlier. The short /o/ remaining in words like lot has also been lowered and, in some accents, unrounded (see open back vowels).

== Variation in present-day English ==
=== Shortening of /uː/ to /ʊ/ ===
In a handful of words, some of which are very common, the vowel /uː/ was shortened to /ʊ/. In a few of those words, notably blood and flood, the shortening happened early enough that the resulting /ʊ/ underwent the "foot–strut split" (see next section) and are now pronounced with /ʌ/. Other words that underwent shortening later consistently have /ʊ/, such as good and foot. Still other words, such as roof, hoof, and root, are variable, with some speakers preferring /uː/ and others preferring /ʊ/ in such words, such as in Texan English. For some speakers in Northern England, words ending in -ook that have undergone shortening to /ʊ/ elsewhere, such as book and cook, still have the long /uː/ vowel.

=== FOOT–STRUT split ===
The foot-strut split: An isogloss of the vowel of the word sun in England

The FOOT–STRUT split is the split of Middle English short /u/ into two distinct phonemes: /ʊ/ (as in foot) and /ʌ/ (as in strut). The split occurs in most varieties of English, the most notable exceptions being most of Northern England and the English Midlands and some varieties of Hiberno-English. In Welsh English, the split is also absent in parts of North Wales under influence from Merseyside and Cheshire accents and in the south of Pembrokeshire, where English overtook Welsh long before that occurred in the rest of Wales.

The origin of the split is the unrounding of /ʊ/ in Early Modern English, resulting in the phoneme /ʌ/. Usually, unrounding to /ʌ/ did not occur if /ʊ/ was preceded by a labial consonant, such as /p/, /f/, /b/, or was followed by /l/, /ʃ/, or /tʃ/, leaving the modern /ʊ/. Because of the inconsistency of the split, put and putt became a minimal pair that were distinguished as /pʊt/ and /pʌt/. The first clear description of the split dates from 1644.

In non-splitting accents, cut and put rhyme, putt and put are homophonous as /pʊt/, and pudding and budding rhyme. However, luck and look may not necessarily be homophones since many accents in the area concerned have look as /luːk/, with the vowel of goose.

The absence of the split is a less common feature of educated Northern English speech than the absence of the trap–bath split. The absence of the foot–strut split is sometimes stigmatized, and speakers of non-splitting accents may try to introduce it into their speech, which sometimes results in hypercorrection such as by pronouncing butcher /ˈbʌtʃər/.

In Birmingham and the Black Country, the realisation of the FOOT and STRUT vowels is somewhat like a neutralisation between Northern and Southern dialects. FOOT may be pronounced with a [ɤ], and STRUT may be pronounced with a [o]. However, both may also be pronounced with a phonetically intermediate [ɤ] which is also present further north in Tyneside. There is also variation in some non-splitting dialects, as while most words use /ʊ/, some words such as none, one, once, nothing, tongue and among(st) may instead be pronounced with [ɒ] in dialects such as parts of Yorkshire.

The name FOOT–STRUT split refers to the lexical sets introduced by Wells (1982) and identifies the vowel phonemes in the words. From a historical point of view, however, the name is inappropriate because the word foot did not have short /ʊ/ when the split happened, but it underwent shortening only later.

FOOT–STRUT split stages, as described by Wells (1982:199)
	mood goose tooth	good foot book	blood flood brother	cut dull fun	put full sugar
Middle English input	oː	oː	oː	u	u
Great Vowel Shift	uː	uː	uː	u	u
Early shortening	uː	uː	u	u	u
Quality adjustment	uː	uː	ʊ	ʊ	ʊ
Foot-strut split	uː	uː	ɤ	ɤ	ʊ
Later shortening	uː	ʊ	ɤ	ɤ	ʊ
Quality adjustment	uː	ʊ	ʌ	ʌ	ʊ
RP/GA output	uː	ʊ	ʌ	ʌ	ʊ

In modern standard varieties of English, such as Received Pronunciation (RP) and General American (GA), the FOOT vowel /ʊ/ is a relatively uncommon phoneme. It occurs most regularly in words in -ook (like book, cook, hook etc.). It is also spelt -oo- in foot, good, hood, soot, stood, wood, wool, and -oul- in could, should, would. Otherwise, it is spelt -u- (but -o- after w-); such words include bull, bush, butcher, cushion, full, pudding, pull, push, puss, put, sugar, wolf, woman. More frequent use is found in recent borrowings though sometimes in alternation with STRUT (as in Muslim in both RP/GA) or GOOSE (as in Buddha in GA).

=== STRUT–COMMA merger ===
The STRUT–COMMA merger or the STRUT–schwa merger is a merger of /ʌ/ with /ə/ that occurs in Welsh English, some higher-prestige Northern England English and some General American. The merger causes minimal pairs such as unorthodoxy /ʌnˈɔːrθədɒksi/ and an orthodoxy /ənˈɔːrθədɒksi/ to be merged. The phonetic quality of the merged vowel depends on the accent. For instance, merging General American accents have [ʌ] as the stressed variant and [ɐ] as the word-final variant. Elsewhere, the vowel surfaces as [ə] or even [ɪ̈] (GA features the weak vowel merger). That can cause words such as hubbub (/ˈhʌbʌb/ in RP) to have two different vowels ([ˈhʌbəb]) even though both syllables contain the same phoneme in both merging and non-merging accents. On the other hand, some areas like Birmingham in England and much of Wales have no noticeable difference between the stressed and the unstressed allophones, and at least the non-final variant of the merged vowel is consistently realized as the mid and central [ə] (rather than open-mid).

The merged vowel is typically written with ⟨ə⟩ regardless of its phonetic realization. That largely matches an older canonical phonetic range of the IPA symbol ⟨ə⟩, which used to be described as covering a vast central area from near-close [ɪ̈] to near-open [ɐ].

Because in unmerged accents, /ə/ appears only in unstressed syllables, the merger occurs only in unstressed syllables. Word-finally, there is no contrast between the vowels in any accent of English (in Middle English, /u/, the vowel from which /ʌ/ was split, could not occur in that position), and the vowel that occurs in that position approaches [ɐ] (the main allophone of STRUT in many accents). However, there is some dialectal variation, with varieties such as broad Cockney using variants that are strikingly more open than in other dialects. The vowel is usually identified as belonging to the /ə/ phoneme even in accents without the /ʌ–ə/ merger, but native speakers may perceive the phonemic makeup of words such as comma to be /ˈkɒmʌ/, rather than /ˈkɒmə/. The open variety of /ə/ occurs even in some Northern English dialects (such as Geordie), none of which has undergone the foot–strut split, but in Geordie, it can be generalised to other positions and so not only comma but also commas may be pronounced with [ɐ] in the second syllable, which is rare in other accents. In contemporary Standard Southern British English, the final /ə/ is often mid [ə], rather than open [ɐ].

Many speakers of North American English neutralise /ʌ/, /ə/ and /ɜː/ (the NURSE vowel) before /r/, which results in an r-colored vowel [ɚ]. GA lacks a truly contrastive /ɜː/ phoneme (furry, hurry, letters and transfer (n.), which are distinguished in RP as /ɜː/, /ʌ/, /ə/ and /ɜː/, all have the same r-colored [ɚ] in GA), and the symbol is used only to facilitate comparisons with other accents. See hurry–furry merger for more information.

Some other minimal pairs apart from unorthodoxy–an orthodoxy include unequal /ʌnˈiːkwəl/ vs. an equal /ənˈiːkwəl/ and a large untidy room /ə ˈlɑːrdʒ ʌnˈtaɪdi ˈruːm/ vs. a large and tidy room /ə ˈlɑːrdʒ ənˈtaɪdi ˈruːm/. However, there are few minimal pairs like that, and their use as such has been criticised by scholars such as Geoff Lindsey because the members of such minimal pairs are structurally different. Even so, pairs of words belonging to the same lexical category exist as well such as append /əˈpɛnd/ vs up-end /ʌpˈɛnd/ and aneath /əˈniːθ/ vs uneath /ʌnˈiːθ/. An example of a near-minimal pair is cherub /ˈtʃɛrəb/ vs. hubbub /ˈhʌbʌb/. There also are words for which RP always used /ʌ/ in the unstressed syllable, such as pick-up /ˈpɪkʌp/, goosebumps /ˈɡuːsbʌmps/ or sawbuck /ˈsɔːbʌk/, that have merging accents use the same /ə/ as the second vowel of balance. In RP, there is a consistent difference in vowel height; the unstressed vowel in the first three words is a near-open [ɐ] (traditionally written with ⟨ʌ⟩) but in balance, it is a mid [ə].

=== Development of /juː/ ===
Earlier Middle English distinguished the close front rounded vowel /yː/ (occurring in loanwords from Anglo-Norman like duke) and the diphthongs /iw/ (occurring in words like new), /ew/ (occurring in words like few) and /ɛw/ (occurring in words like dew).

By Late Middle English, /yː/, /ew/, and /iw/ all merged as /ɪw/. In Early Modern English, /ɛw/ merged into /ɪw/ as well.

/ɪw/ has remained as such in some Welsh, some northern English and a few American accents. Thus, those varieties of Welsh English keep threw /θrɪw/ distinct from through /θruː/. In most accents, however, the falling diphthong /ɪw/ turned into a rising diphthong, which became the sequence /juː/. The change had taken place in London by the late 1800s. Depending on the preceding consonant and on the dialect, it either remained as /juː/ or developed into /uː/ by the processes of yod-dropping or yod-coalescence. That has caused the standard pronunciations of duke /d(j)uːk/ (or /dʒuːk/), new /n(j)uː/, few /fjuː/ and rude /ruːd/ (making it a homophone of rood).

=== FOOT–GOOSE merger ===
The FOOT–GOOSE merger is a phenomenon in Scottish English, Northern Irish English, Malaysian English, and Singapore English, in which the modern English phonemes /ʊ/ and /uː/ have merged into a single phoneme. As a result, word pairs like look and Luke, pull and pool, full and fool are homophones, and pairs like good and food and foot and boot rhyme.

The history of the merger dates back to two Middle English phonemes: the long vowel /oː/ (which shoot traces back to) and the short vowel /u/ (which put traces back to). As a result of the Great Vowel Shift, /oː/ raised to /uː/, which continues to be the pronunciation of shoot today. Meanwhile, the Middle English /u/ later adjusted to /ʊ/, as put is pronounced today. However, the /uː/ of shoot next underwent a phonemic split in which some words retained /uː/ (like mood) while the vowel of other words shortened to /ʊ/ (like good). Therefore, the two processes (/oː/→/uː/→/ʊ/ and /u/→/ʊ/) resulted in a merger of the vowels in certain words, like good and put, to /ʊ/, which is now typical of how all English dialects pronounce those two words. (See the table in the section "FOOT–STRUT split" above for more information about these early shifts.) (Note: The FOOT–GOOSE merger, in fact, occurs only in dialects that have already undergone the FOOT–STRUT split.) The final step, however, was for certain English dialects under the influence of foreign languages (the Scots language influencing Scottish English, for example) to merge the newly united /ʊ/ vowel with the /uː/ vowel (of mood and shoot): the FOOT–GOOSE merger. Again, this is not an internally motivated phonemic merger but the appliance of different languages' vowel systems to English lexical incidence. The quality of this final merged vowel is usually [ʉ~y~ʏ] in Scotland and Northern Ireland but [u] in Singapore.

The full–fool merger is a conditioned merger of the same two vowels specifically before /l/, which causes pairs like pull/pool and full/fool to be homophones; it appears in many other dialects of English and is particularly gaining attention in several American English varieties.

Homophonous pairs
/ʊ/	/uː/	IPA	Notes
bull	boule	buːl	
cookie	kooky	kuːki	Also homophones in some dialects that lack the FOOT–GOOSE merger but pronounce cookie as /kuːki/ rather than /kʊki/.
could	cooed	kuːd	
full	fool	fuːl	
hood	who'd	huːd	
look	Luke	luːk	Also homophones in some dialects that lack the FOOT–GOOSE merger but pronounce look as /luːk/ rather than /lʊk/.
looker	lucre	ˈluːkər	Also homophones in some dialects that lack the FOOT–GOOSE merger but pronounce looker as /ˈluːkər/ rather than /ˈlʊkər/.
pull	pool	puːl	
should	shooed	ʃuːd	
soot	suit	suːt	With yod-dropping.
wood	wooed	wuːd	
would	wooed	wuːd	

=== Other changes ===
In Geordie, the GOOSE vowel undergoes an allophonic split, with the monophthong [uː ~ ʉː] being used in morphologically-closed syllables (as in bruise [bɹuːz ~ bɹʉːz]) and the diphthong [ɵʊ] being used in morphologically-open syllables word-finally (as in brew [bɹɵʊ]) but also word-internally at the end of a morpheme (as in brews [bɹɵʊz]).

Most dialects of English turn /uː/ into a diphthong, and the monophthongal [uː ~ ʉː ~ ɨː] is in free variation with the diphthongal [ʊu ~ ʊ̈ʉ ~ ɪ̈ʉ ~ ɪ̈ɨ], particularly word-internally. Word-finally, diphthongs are more usual. Compare the identical development of the close front FLEECE vowel.

The change of /uː.ɪ/ to [ʊɪ] is a process that occurs in many varieties of British English in which bisyllabic /uː.ɪ/ has become the diphthong [ʊɪ] in certain words. As a result, "ruin" is pronounced as monosyllabic [ˈɹʊɪn] and "fluid" is pronounced [ˈflʊɪd].

== See also ==
- Phonological history of English
- Phonological history of English vowels
- Phonological history of English consonants
- Phonological history of English consonant clusters § Yod-dropping

== Bibliography ==
- Bauer, Laurie; Warren, Paul; Bardsley, Dianne; Kennedy, Marianna; Major, George (2007), "New Zealand English", Journal of the International Phonetic Association, 37 (1): 97–102, doi:10.1017/S0025100306002830
- Beal, Joan (2004), "English dialects in the North of England: phonology", in Schneider, Edgar W.; Burridge, Kate; Kortmann, Bernd; Mesthrie, Rajend; Upton, Clive (eds.), A handbook of varieties of English, vol. 1: Phonology, Mouton de Gruyter, pp. 113–133, ISBN 3-11-017532-0
- International Phonetic Association (2010) [1949], "The Principles of the International Phonetic Association", Journal of the International Phonetic Association, 40 (3): 299–358, doi:10.1017/S0025100311000089, hdl:2027/wu.89001200120, S2CID 232345365
- Petyt, Keith M. (1985), 'Dialect' and 'Accent' in Industrial West Yorkshire, John Benjamins Publishing Company, ISBN 9027279497
- Watt, Dominic; Allen, William (2003), "Tyneside English", Journal of the International Phonetic Association, 33 (2): 267–271, doi:10.1017/S0025100303001397
- Wells, John C. (1982). Accents of English. Vol. 1: An Introduction (pp. i–xx, 1–278), Vol. 2: The British Isles (pp. i–xx, 279–466), Vol. 3: Beyond the British Isles (pp. i–xx, 467–674). Cambridge University Press. doi:10.1017/CBO9780511611759, doi:10.1017/CBO9780511611766. ISBN 0-52129719-2, 0-52128540-2, 0-52128541-0.
- Wells, John C. (2008), Longman Pronunciation Dictionary (3rd ed.), Longman, ISBN 978-1-4058-8118-0
