= Phonological history of English diphthongs =

The phonological history of English diphthongs comprises sound changes to phonemes that have historically been diphthongs in the English language.

== Background ==
English diphthongs have undergone many changes since the Old and Middle English periods. The sound changes discussed here involved at least one phoneme which historically was a diphthong.

== Old English ==
Old English diphthongs could be short or long. Both kinds arose from sound changes occurring in Old English itself, although the long forms sometimes also developed from Proto-Germanic diphthongs. They were mostly of the height-harmonic type (both elements at the same height) with the second element further back than the first. The set of diphthongs that occurred depended on dialect (and their exact pronunciation is in any case uncertain). Typical diphthongs are considered to have been as follows:

- high, fully backing, /iu/ /iːu/, spelt ⟨io⟩ (found in Anglian dialects, but merged into /eo/ /eːo/ in Late West Saxon)
- high, narrower, possibly /iy/ /iːy/ or /ie/ /iːe/, spelt ⟨ie⟩ (found in Late West Saxon)
- mid, /eo/ /eːo/, spelt ⟨eo⟩
- low, /æɑ/ /æːɑ/, spelt ⟨ea⟩

As with monophthongs, the length of the diphthongs was not indicated in spelling, but in modern editions of OE texts the long forms are often written with a macron: ⟨īo⟩, ⟨īe⟩, ⟨ēo⟩, ⟨ēa⟩.

In the transition from Old to Middle English, all of these diphthongs generally merged with monophthongs.

== Middle English ==
=== Development of new diphthongs ===
Although the Old English diphthongs merged into monophthongs, Middle English began to develop a new set of diphthongs. Many of these came about through vocalization of the palatal approximant /j/ (usually from an earlier /ʝ/) or the labio-velar approximant /w/ (sometimes from an earlier voiced velar fricative [ɣ]), when they followed a vowel. For example:

- OE dæg ("day") and weg ("way") (where the /ɡ/ had been palatalized to /j/) became [daj] and [wɛj]
- OE clawu ("claw") and lagu ("law") became [klaw] and [law]

Diphthongs also arose as a result of vowel breaking before /h/ (which had allophones [x] and [ç] in this position – for the subsequent disappearance of these sounds, see h-loss). For example:

- OE streht ("straight") became [strɛjçt]
- OE þoht ("thought") became [θɒwxt]

The diphthongs that developed by these processes also came to be used in many loanwords, particularly those from Old French. For a table showing the development of the Middle English diphthongs, see Middle English phonology (diphthong equivalents).

=== Vein–vain merger ===
Early Middle English had two separate diphthongs /ɛj/ and /aj/. The vowel /ɛj/ was typically represented orthographically with "ei" or "ey", and the vowel /aj/ was typically represented orthographically with "ai" or "ay". These came to be merged, perhaps by the fourteenth century. The merger is reflected in all dialects of present-day English.

In early Middle English, before the merger, way and day, which came from Old English weġ and dæġ had /ej/ and /aj/ respectively. Similarly, vein and vain (borrowings from French) were pronounced differently as /vejn/ and /vajn/. After the merger, vein and vain were homophones, and way and day rhymed.

The merged vowel was a diphthong, something like /ɛj/ or /æj/. Later (around the 1800s) this diphthong would merge in most dialects with the monophthong of words like pane in the pane–pain merger.

=== Late Middle English ===
The English of southeastern England around 1400 had seven diphthongs, of which three ended in /j/:

- /ʊj/ as in boil, destroy, coin, join
- /ɛj/ as in nail, day, whey (the product of the vein–vain merger)
- /ɔj/ as in joy, noise, royal, coy

and four ended in /w/:

- /ɪw/ as in view, new, due, use, lute, suit, adieu (the product of a merger of earlier /iw/ and /ew/, and incorporating French loans that originally had /y/)
- /ɛw/ as in few, dew, ewe, shrewd, neuter, beauty
- /ɔw/ as in low, soul
- /ɑw/ as in cause, law, salt, change, chamber, psalm, half, dance, aunt.

Typical spellings are as in the examples above. The spellings eu and ew are both /ɪw/ and /ɛw/, and the spellings oi and oy are used for both /ɔj/ and /ʊj/. The most common words with ew pronounced /ɛw/ were dew, few, hew, lewd, mew, newt, pewter, sew, shew (show), shrew, shrewd and strew. Words in which /ʊj/ was commonly used included boil, coin, destroy, join, moist, point, poison, soil, spoil, Troy, turmoil and voice, although there was significant variation.

== Modern English ==
=== 16th century ===
By the mid-16th century, the Great Vowel Shift had created two new diphthongs out of the former long close monophthongs /iː/ and /uː/ of Middle English. The diphthongs were /əɪ/ as in tide, and /əʊ/ as in house. Thus, the English of south-eastern England could then have had nine diphthongs.

By the late 16th century, the inventory of diphthongs had been reduced as a result of several developments, all of which took place in the mid-to-late 16th century:

- /ɛw/ merged into /ɪw/ and so dew and due became homophones.
- /ɛj/ (from the vein–vain merger) became monophthongized and merged with the /ɛː/ of words like name (which before the Great Vowel Shift had been long /aː/). For more information, see pane–pain merger, below.
  - For a time, many speakers had an /ɛː/ monophthong in pain distinct from an /æː/ monophthong in pane.
- /ɑw/, as in cause, became monophthongized to /ɒː/, later raising to modern /ɔː/.
- /ɔw/, as in low, was monophthongized to /ɔː/. That would later rise to /oː/, which merged with the vowel of toe; see toe–tow merger, below.

That left /ɪu/, /ɔɪ/, /ʊɪ/, /əɪ/ and /əʊ/ as the diphthongs of south-eastern England.

=== 17th century ===
By the late 17th century, these further developments had taken place in the dialect of south-eastern England:

- The falling diphthong /ɪw/ of due and dew changed to a rising diphthong, which became the sequence [juː]. The change did not occur in all dialects, however; see yod-dropping.
- The diphthongs /əɪ/ and /əʊ/ of tide and house widened to /aɪ/ and /aʊ/, respectively.
- The diphthong /ʊɪ/ merged into /əɪ/~/aɪ/. Contemporary literature had frequent rhymes such as Mind–join'd in Congreve, join–line in Pope, child–spoil'd in Swift, toils–smiles in Dryden.
- The diphthong /aɪ/ split into /aɪ/ and /ɔɪ/, though this sound change was still ongoing in the late 18th century. The present-day pronunciations with /ɔɪ/ in the oi words result from regional variants, which had always had /ɔɪ/, rather than /ʊɪ/, perhaps because of influence by the spelling.

The changes above caused only the diphthongs /aɪ/, /aʊ/ and /ɔɪ/ to remain.

=== Later developments ===
In the 18th century or later, the monophthongs /eː/ and /oː/ (the products of the pane–pain and toe–tow mergers) became diphthongal in Standard English. That produced the vowels /eɪ/ and /oʊ/. In RP, the starting point of the latter diphthong has now become more centralized and is commonly written /əʊ/.

RP has also developed centering diphthongs /ɪə/, /eə/, /ʊə/, as a result of breaking before /r/ and the loss of /r/ when it is not followed by another vowel (see English-language vowel changes before historical /r/). They occur in words like near, square and cure.

Present-day RP is thus normally analyzed as having eight diphthongs: the five closing diphthongs /eɪ/, /əʊ/, /aɪ/, /aʊ/, /ɔɪ/ (of face, goat, price, mouth and choice) and the three centering diphthongs /ɪə/, /eə/, /ʊə/. General American does not have the centering diphthongs (at least, not as independent phonemes). For more information, see English phonology (vowels).

== Variation in present-day English ==
=== Coil–curl merger ===
The coil–curl or oil–earl merger is a vowel merger that historically occurred in some non-rhotic dialects of American English, making both /ə/ and /ɔɪ/ become /əɪ/. This is strongly associated with New York City English and New Orleans English, but only the latter has any modern presence of the feature.

=== Cot–coat merger ===
The cot–coat merger is a phenomenon exhibited by some speakers of Zulu English in which the phonemes /ɒ/ and /oʊ/ are not distinguished, making "cot" and "coat" homophones. Zulu English often also has a cot–caught merger, so that sets like "cot", "caught" and "coat" can be homophones.

This merger can also be found in some broad Central Belt Scottish English accents. The merger of both sounds into /o/ is standard in Central Scots.

=== Line–loin merger ===
The line–loin merger (sometimes also called the PRICE–CHOICE merger, using the respective lexical set words) is a merger between the diphthongs /aɪ/ and /ɔɪ/ that occurs in some accents of Southern English English, Hiberno-English, Newfoundland English, Caribbean English, West Country English, and Northern England English. Pairs like line and loin, bile and boil, imply and employ are homophones in merging accents.

Homophonous pairs
/aɪ/	/ɔɪ/	IPA
aisle	oil	ˈɑɪl
ally	alloy	ˈælɑɪ
bile	boil	ˈbɑɪl
buy, by, bye, buy	boy, buoy	ˈbɑɪ
divide	devoid	dɪˈvɑɪd
dried	droid	ˈdrɑɪd
file	foil	ˈfɑɪl
fire	foyer	ˈfɑɪə(r) (Note: Foyer may also be pronounced /ˈfɑɪeɪ/ or /ˈfwɑːjeɪ/.)
grind	groined	ˈɡrɑɪnd
guy	goy	ˈɡɑɪ
heist	hoist	ˈhɑɪst
hi, high	hoy	ˈhɑɪ
I	oi, oy	ˈɑɪ
I'll, isle	oil	ˈɑɪl
imply	employ	ɪmˈplɑɪ
Jain	join	ˈdʒɑɪn
Kai	coy, koi	ˈkɑɪ
kine	coin	ˈkɑɪn
Kyle	coil	ˈkɑɪl
liar	lawyer	ˈlɑɪə(r)
lied	Lloyd	ˈlɑɪd
line	loin	ˈlɑɪn
Lyle	loyal	ˈlɑɪəl (Note: With vile–vial merger)
lyre	lawyer	ˈlɑɪə(r)
mile	moil	ˈmɑɪl
nighs	noise	ˈnɑɪz
Nile	noil	ˈnɑɪl
pie	poi	ˈpɑɪ
pies	poise	ˈpɑɪz
pint	point	ˈpɑɪnt
ply	ploy	ˈplɑɪ
psi	soy	ˈsɑɪ
quite	quoit	ˈkwɑɪt
ride	roid	ˈrɑɪd
rile	roil	ˈrɑɪl
rile	royal	ˈrɑɪəl
rye	Roy	ˈrɑɪ
sigh	soy	ˈsɑɪ
sire	sawyer	ˈsɑɪə(r)
sire	soya	ˈsɑɪə (Note: Non-rhotic accents)
Thai, tie	toy	ˈtɑɪ
tide	toyed	ˈtɑɪd
tile	toil	ˈtɑɪl
try	Troy	ˈtrɑɪ
vice	voice	ˈvɑɪs
vied	void	ˈvɑɪd
wry	Roy	ˈrɑɪ

=== Long mid mergers ===
The earliest stage of Early Modern English had a contrast between the long mid monophthongs /eː, oː/ (as in pane and toe respectively) and the diphthongs /ɛj, ɔw/ (as in pain and tow respectively). In the vast majority of Modern English accents these have been merged, so that the pairs pane–pain and toe–tow are homophones. These mergers are grouped together by Wells as the long mid mergers. All accents with the pane–pain merger have the toe–tow merger and vice versa.

==== Pane–pain merger ====
The pane–pain merger is a merger of the long mid monophthong /eː/ and the diphthong /eɪ/ that occurs in most dialects of English. In the vast majority of Modern English accents, the vowels have been merged; whether the outcome is monophthongal or diphthongal depends on the accent. However, in a few regional accents, including some in East Anglia, South Wales, South Asia, and even Newfoundland and older Maine accents, the merger has not gone through (at least not completely) and so pairs like pane–pain are distinct.

A distinction, with the pane words pronounced with [eː] and the pain words pronounced with [æɪ], survived in Norfolk English into the 20th century. Trudgill describes the disappearance of the distinction in Norfolk: "This disappearance was being effected by the gradual and variable transfer of lexical items from the set of /eː/ to the set of /æɪ/ as part of dedialectalisation process, the end-point of which will soon be (a few speakers even today maintain a vestigial and variable distinction) the complete merger of the two lexical sets under /æɪ/ — the completion of a slow process of lexical diffusion."

Walters (2001) reports the survival of the distinction in the Welsh English spoken in the Rhondda Valley, with [eː] in the pane words and [ɛi] in the pain words.

In accents that preserve the distinction, the phoneme /eɪ/ is usually represented by the spellings ai, ay, ei and ey as in day, play, rain, pain, maid, rein, they etc. and the phoneme /eː/ is usually represented by aCe as in pane, plane, lane, late etc. and sometimes by é and e as in re, café, Santa Fe etc.

Homophonous pairs
/eː/	/eɪ/	IPA
ade	aid	ˈeɪd
ale	ail	ˈeɪl
ate	eight	ˈeɪt (Note: With wait–weight merger)
bale	bail	ˈbeɪl
bade	bayed	ˈbeɪd
blare	Blair	ˈbleə(r)
blaze	Blaise	ˈbleɪz
cane	Cain	ˈkeɪn
clade	clayed	ˈkleɪd
Clare	Claire	ˈkleə(r)
bate	bait	ˈbeɪt
Daly	daily	ˈdeɪli
Dane	deign	ˈdeɪn
daze	days	ˈdeɪz
e'er	air	ˈeə(r)
e'er	heir	ˈeə(r)
ere	air	ˈeə(r)
ere	heir	ˈeə(r)
fane	fain	ˈfeɪn
fare	fair	ˈfeə(r)
faze	fays	ˈfeɪz
flare	flair	ˈfleə(r)
gale	Gail	ˈɡeɪl
gate	gait	ˈɡeɪt
gaze	gays	ˈɡeɪz
glave	glaive	ˈɡleɪv (Note: Homonyms)
grade	grayed	ˈɡreɪd
graze	grays	ˈɡreɪz
ha (Note: An alternate name of the letter H)	hay	ˈheɪ
hale	hail	ˈheɪl
hare	hair	ˈheə(r)
haze	hays	ˈheɪz
haze	heys	ˈheɪz
K	cay	ˈkeɪ
lade	laid	ˈleɪd
lane	lain	ˈleɪn
laze	lays	ˈleɪz
made	maid	ˈmeɪd
Mae	May	ˈmeɪ
male	mail	ˈmeɪl
mane	main	ˈmeɪn
maze	maize	ˈmeɪz
maze	Mays	ˈmeɪz
page	Paige	ˈpeɪdʒ
pale	pail	ˈpeɪl
pane	pain	ˈpeɪn
pare	pair	ˈpeə(r)
pear	pair	ˈpeə(r)
phase	fays	ˈfeɪz
phrase	frays	ˈfreɪz
plane	plain	ˈpleɪn
plate	plait	ˈpleɪt
Rae	ray	ˈreɪ
raze	raise	ˈreɪz
raze	rays	ˈreɪz
razor	raiser	ˈreɪzə(r)
re	ray	ˈreɪ
sale	sail	ˈseɪl
sane	sain	ˈseɪn
sane	seine	ˈseɪn
sane	Seine	ˈseɪn
spade	spayed	ˈspeɪd
stare	stair	ˈsteə(r)
suede	swayed	ˈsweɪd
tale	tail	ˈteɪl
there	their	ˈðeə(r)
there	they're	ˈðeə(r)
trade	trayed	ˈtreɪd
vale	vail	ˈveɪl
vale	veil	ˈveɪl
vane	vain	ˈveɪn
vane	vein	ˈveɪn
wade	weighed	ˈweɪd
wale	wail	ˈweɪl
wales	wails	ˈweɪlz
Wales	wails	ˈweɪlz
wane	wain	ˈweɪn
wane	Wayne	ˈweɪn
waste	waist	ˈweɪst
wave	waive	ˈweɪv
waver	waiver	ˈweɪv
whale	wail	ˈweɪl (Note: With wine–whine merger)

==== Toe–tow merger ====
The toe–tow merger is a merger of the Early Modern English vowels /oː/ (as in toe) and /ou/ (as in tow) that occurs in most dialects of English. (The vowels in Middle English and at the beginning of the Early Modern English period were /ɔː/ and /ɔw/ respectively, and they shifted in the second phase of the Great Vowel Shift.)

The merger occurs in the vast majority of Modern English accents; whether the outcome is monophthongal or diphthongal depends on the accent. The traditional phonetic transcription for General American and earlier Received Pronunciation in the 20th century is /oʊ/, a diphthong. But in a few regional accents, including some in Northern England, East Anglia, South Wales and South Asia, the merger has not gone through (at least not completely), so that pairs like toe and tow, moan and mown, groan and grown, sole and soul, throne and thrown are distinct.

In 19th century England, the distinction was still very widespread; the main areas with the merger were in the northern Home Counties and parts of the Midlands.

The distinction is most often preserved in East Anglian accents, especially in Norfolk. Peter Trudgill discusses this distinction, and states that:

[...] until very recently, all Norfolk English speakers consistently and automatically maintained the nose–knows distinction [...] In the 1940s and 1950s, it was therefore a totally unremarkable feature of Norfolk English shared by all speakers, and therefore of no salience whatsoever.

In a 2002 investigation into the English of the Fens, young people in west Norfolk were found to be maintaining the distinction, with back [ʊu] or [ɤʊ] in the toe set and central [ɐʉ] in the tow set, with the latter but not the former showing the influence of Estuary English.

Walters reports the survival of the distinction in the Welsh English spoken in the Rhondda Valley, with [oː] in the toe words and [ow] in the tow words.

Reports of Maine English in the 1970s reported a similar toad–towed distinction among older speakers, but was lost in subsequent generations.

In accents that preserve the distinction, the phoneme descended from Early Modern English /ou/ is usually represented by the spellings ou, and ow as in soul, dough, tow, know, though etc. or through L-vocalization as in bolt, cold, folk, roll etc., while that descended from Early Modern English /oː/ is usually represented by oa, oe, or oCe as in boat, road, toe, doe, home, hose, go, tone etc.

Homophonous pairs
/oː/	/ou/	IPA
Bo	bow	ˈboʊ
bode	bowed	ˈboʊd
borne	bourn(e)	ˈboə(r)n
borne	Bourne	ˈboə(r)n
coaled	cold	ˈkoʊld
coarse	course	ˈkoə(r)s
do (note)	dough	ˈdoʊ
doe	dough	ˈdoʊ
doze	doughs	ˈdoʊz
floe	flow	ˈfloʊ
foaled	fold	ˈfoʊld
fore	four	ˈfoə(r)
forth	fourth	ˈfoə(r)θ
fro	frow	ˈfroʊ
froe	frow	ˈfroʊ
froze	frows	ˈfroʊz
groan	grown	ˈɡroʊn
holed	hold	ˈhoʊld
moan	mown	ˈmoʊn
mode	mowed	ˈmoʊd
Moe	mow	ˈmoʊ
no	know	ˈnoʊ
nose	knows	ˈnoʊz
O	owe	ˈoʊ
ode	owed	ˈoʊd
oh	owe	ˈoʊ
pole	poll	ˈpoʊl
pore	pour	ˈpoə(r)
road	rowed	ˈroʊd
rode	rowed	ˈroʊd
roe	row	ˈroʊ
role	roll	ˈroʊl
rose	rows	ˈroʊz
shone	shewn	ˈʃoʊn
shone	shown	ˈʃoʊn
so	sew	ˈsoʊ
so	sow	ˈsoʊ
sole	soul	ˈsoʊl
soled	sold	ˈsoʊld
soled	souled	ˈsoʊld
throe	throw	ˈθroʊ
throne	thrown	ˈθroʊn
toad	towed	ˈtoʊd
toe	tow	ˈtoʊ
toed	towed	ˈtoʊd
tole	toll	ˈtoʊl

=== Pride–proud merger ===
The pride–proud merger is a merger of the diphthongs /aɪ/ and /aʊ/ before voiced consonants into monophthongal /a/ occurring for some speakers of African American Vernacular English; making pride and proud, dine and down, find and found, etc. homophones. Some speakers with this merger may also have the rod–ride merger, hence having a three-way merger of /ɑ/, /aɪ/ and /aʊ/ before voiced consonants, making pride, prod, and proud and find, found and fond homophones.

Homophonous pairs
/aɪ/	/aʊ/	IPA	Notes
bi	bough	ˈba	
bi	bow	ˈba	
bide	bowed	ˈbad	
bight	bout	ˈbat	
bite	bout	ˈbat	
brine	brown	ˈbran	
buy	bough	ˈba	
buy	bow	ˈba	
by	bough	ˈba	
by	bow	ˈba	
bye	bough	ˈba	
bye	bow	ˈba	
chai	chow	ˈtʃa	
Clyde	cloud	ˈklad	
dine	down	ˈdan	
dire	dour	ˈda(ə)r	
dyne	down	ˈdan	
file	foul	ˈfal	
file	fowl	ˈfal	
find	found	ˈfand	
fined	found	ˈfand	
flight	flout	ˈflat	
Giles	jowls	ˈdʒalz	
hi	how	ˈha	
high	how	ˈha	
hind	hound	ˈhand	
I	ow	ˈa	
I'll	owl	ˈal	
ire	hour	ˈa(ə)r	
ire	our	ˈa(ə)r	
isle	owl	ˈal	
Kai	cow	ˈka	
Kyle	cowl	ˈkal	
liar	lour	ˈla(ə)r	
lice	louse	ˈlas	
lied	loud	ˈlad	
light	lout	ˈlat	
lite	lout	ˈlat	
lyre	lour	ˈla(ə)r	
lyse	louse	ˈlas	
mice	mouse	ˈmas	
mind	mound	ˈmand	
mined	mound	ˈmand	
nigh	now	ˈna	
nine	noun	ˈnan	
Nye	now	ˈna	
phial	foul	ˈfa(ə)l	With vile–vial merger.
phial	fowl	ˈfa(ə)l	With vile–vial merger.
ply	plow; plough	ˈpla	
pride	proud	ˈprad	
pried	proud	ˈprad	
pries	prows	ˈpraz	
prise	prows	ˈpraz	
prize	prows	ˈpraz	
pry	prow	ˈpra	
pyre	power	ˈpa(ə)r	
ride	rowed	ˈrad	
right	rout	ˈrat	
right	route	ˈrat	
rind	round	ˈrand]	
rise	rouse	ˈraz	
rise	rows	ˈraz	
rite	rout	ˈrat	
rite	route	ˈrat	
rye	row	ˈra	
ryes	rouse	ˈraz	
sai	sow	ˈsa	
sigh	sow	ˈsa	
signed	sound	ˈsand]	
sire	sour	ˈsa(ə)r	
size	sows	ˈsaz	
sly	slough	ˈsla	
thy	thou	ˈða	
tie	tau	ˈta	
tight	tout	ˈtat	
tine	town	ˈtan	
trite	trout	ˈtat	
Ty	tau	ˈta	
vie	vow	ˈva	
why	wow	ˈwa	With wine–whine merger.
wise	wows	ˈwaz	
Y; wye	wow	ˈwa	

=== Rod–ride merger ===
The rod–ride merger is a merger of /ɑ/ and /aɪ/ occurring for some speakers of African American Vernacular English, in which rod and ride are merged as /rad/. Some other speakers may keep the contrast, so that rod is /rɑd/ and ride is /rad/. Monophthongization of the PRICE vowel also occurs in Southern American English, however no vowel merger has been reported.

This is similar to an earlier sound change where Proto-Germanic *ai shifted to Old English ā.

Homophonous pairs
/ɑ/	/aɪ/	IPA	Notes
ah	eye	ˈa	
ah	I	ˈa	
baa	buy	ˈba	
baa	by	ˈba	
baa	bye	ˈba	
blot	blight	ˈblat	
bock	bike	ˈbak	
bod	bide	ˈbad	
bot	bight	ˈbat	
bot	bite	ˈbat	
box	bikes	ˈbaks	
con	kine	ˈkan	
cot	kite	ˈkat	
doc	dike	ˈdak	
dock	dike	ˈdak	
dom	dime	ˈdam	
Dom	dime	ˈdam	
don	dine	ˈdan	
Don	dine	ˈdan	
fa	fie	ˈfa	
far	fire	ˈfar	
god	guide	ˈgad	
grom	grime	ˈgram	
ha	high	ˈha	
hock	hike	ˈhak	
hot	height	ˈhat	
jar	gyre	ˈdʒar	
job	gibe, jibe	ˈdʒab	
knot	knight	ˈnat	
knot	night	ˈnat	
la	lie	ˈla	
la	lye	ˈla	
lock	like	ˈlak	
lot	light, lite	ˈlat	
lox	likes	ˈlaks	
ma	my	ˈma	
mar	mire	ˈmar	
mock	mic	ˈmak	
mock	Mike	ˈmak	
mom	mime	ˈmam	
motte	might	ˈmat	
motte	mite	ˈmat	
nah	nigh	ˈna	
nah	Nye	ˈna	
not	knight	ˈnat	
not	night	ˈnat	
odd	ide	ˈad	
odds	ides	ˈadz	
ox	Ike's	ˈaks	
pa	pi	ˈpa	
pa	pie	ˈpa	
par	pyre	ˈpar	
pock	pike	ˈpak	
pod	pied	ˈpad	
plod	plied	ˈplad	
plot	plight	ˈplat	
pop	pipe	ˈpap	
pox	pikes	ˈpaks	
prod	pride	ˈprad	
prod	pried	ˈprad	
prom	prime	ˈpram	
rah	rye	ˈra	
roc	Reich	ˈrak	
rock	Reich	ˈrak	
rod	ride	ˈrad	
ROM	rime	ˈram	
ROM	rhyme	ˈram	
rot	right	ˈrat	
rot	rite	ˈrat	
scrod	scried	ˈskrad	
shah	shy	ˈʃa	
shod	shied	ˈʃad	
slot	sleight	ˈslat	
slot	slight	ˈslat	
sock	psych	ˈsak	
sod	side	ˈsad	
sod	sighed	ˈsad	
sot	sight	ˈsat	
spa	spy	ˈspa	
spar	spire	ˈspar	
spot	spite	ˈspat	
strop	stripe	ˈstrap	
swan	swine	ˈswan	
swap	swipe	ˈswap	
ta	tie	ˈta	
tar	tire, tyre	ˈtar	
tod	tide	ˈtad	
tod	tied	ˈtad	
Todd	tide	ˈtad	
Todd	tied	ˈtad	
tom	time	ˈtam	
tom	thyme	ˈtam	
Tom	time	ˈtam	
Tom	thyme	ˈtam	
top	type	ˈtap	
tot	tight	ˈtat	
trod	tried	ˈtrad	
trot	trite	ˈtrat	
wad	why'd	ˈwad	With wine–whine merger.
wad	wide	ˈwad	
watt	white	ˈwat	With wine–whine merger.
watt	wight	ˈwat	

=== Scottish vowel length rule ===
While the Scottish vowel length rule affects most vowels, Wells analyses the split of the PRICE vowel /aɪ/ as phonological rather than simply allophonic owing to its complexity. Some words such as fire (/fʌɪr/ not /faɪr/) break the pattern for some speakers. The split is present in Scottish English and can be traced back to the late 17th century in the Tyneside accent.

Homophonous pairs
/ʌɪ/	IPA	/aɪ/	IPA	Notes
tied	ˈtʌɪd	tide	ˈtaɪd	Morpheme boundary
sighed	ˈsʌɪd	side	ˈsaɪd	Morpheme boundary

=== Smoothing of /aɪ.ə/ ===
Smoothing of /aɪ.ə/ is a process that occurs in many varieties of British English where bisyllabic /aɪ.ə/ becomes the triphthong /aɪə/ in certain words with /aɪ.ə/. As a result, "scientific" is pronounced /sa(ɪ)ənˈtɪf.ɪk/ with three syllables and "science" is pronounced /ˈsa(ɪ)əns/ with one syllable.

=== Welsh distinctions ===
Some speakers of Welsh English make a distinction between the vowels of certain words in the PRICE (eye /əi/ vs. aye /ai/) and MOUTH (cow /əu/ vs. ow! /au/) lexical sets, though the distinctions only affect a couple of words each.

== See also ==
- Phonological history of English
- Phonological history of English vowels
- Trisyllabic laxing
- Great Vowel Shift
