= English-language vowel changes before historical /l/ =

In the history of English phonology, there have been many diachronic sound changes affecting vowels, especially involving phonemic splits and mergers. A number of these changes are specific to vowels which occur before /l/, especially in cases where the /l/ is at the end of a syllable (or is not followed by a vowel).

== Historical diphthongization before /l/ ==
Diphthongization occurred since Early Modern English in certain -al- and -ol- sequences before coronal or velar consonants, or at the end of a word or morpheme. In these sequences, /al/ became /awl/ and then /ɑul/, while /ɔl/ became /ɔwl/ and then /ɔul/. Both of these merged with existing diphthongs: /ɑu/ as in law and /ɔu/ as in throw.

At the end of a word or morpheme, this produced /ɑul/ in all, ball, call, fall, gall, hall, mall, small, squall, stall, pall, tall, thrall and wall; /ɔul/ in control, droll, extol, knoll, poll (meaning a survey of people,) roll, scroll, stroll, swollen, toll, and troll. The word shall did not follow this trend, and remains /ʃæl/ today.

Before coronal consonants, this produced /ɑul/ in Alderney, alter, bald, balderdash, false, falter, halt, malt, palsy, salt, Wald and Walter; /ɔul/ in bold, cold, fold, gold, hold, molten, mould/mold, old, shoulder (earlier sholder), smolder, told, and wold (in the sense of "tract of land"). As with shall, the word shalt did not follow this trend, and remains /ʃælt/ today.

Before /k/, this produced /ɑul/ in balk, caulk/calk, chalk, Dundalk, falcon, stalk, talk and walk; /ɔul/ in folk, Polk, and yolk.

This L-vocalization established a pattern that would influence the spelling pronunciations of some relatively more recent loanwords like Balt, Malta, waltz, Yalta, and polder. It also influenced English spelling reform efforts, explaining the American English mold and molt vs. the traditional mould and moult.

Certain words of more recent origin or coining, however, do not have the change and retain short vowels, including Al, alcohol, bal, Cal, calcium, gal, Hal, mal-, pal, Sal, talc, Val, doll, Moll, and Poll (a nickname for a parrot.)

The Great Vowel Shift altered the pronunciation of the diphthongs, with /ɑu/ becoming the monophthong /ɔː/, and /ɔu/ raising to /oʊ/.

=== Historical L-vocalization ===
In -alk and -olk words, the /l/ subsequently disappeared entirely in most accents (with the notable exception of Hiberno-English). This change caused /ɑulk/ to become /ɑuk/, and /ɔulk/ to become /ɔuk/. Even outside Ireland, some of these words have more than one pronunciation that retains the /l/ sound, especially in American English where spelling pronunciations caused partial or full reversal of L-vocalization in a handful of cases:

- caulk/calk can be /ˈkɔːlk/ or /ˈkɔːk/.
- falcon can be /ˈfælkən/, /ˈfɒlkən/, /ˈfɔːlkən/ or /ˈfɔːkən/.
- yolk can be /ˈjoʊlk/ or /ˈjoʊk/. yoke as /ˈjoʊk/ is only conditionally homophonous.

Words like fault and vault did not undergo L-vocalization, but rather L-restoration, having previously been L-vocalized independently in Old French and lacking the /l/ in Middle English, but having it restored by Early Modern English. The word falcon existed simultaneously as homonyms fauco(u)n and falcon in Middle English. The word moult/molt never originally had /l/ to begin with, instead deriving from Middle English mout and related etymologically to mutate; the /l/ joined the word intrusively.

The loss of /l/ in words spelt with -alf, -alm, -alve and -olm did not involve L-vocalization in the same sense, but rather the elision of the consonant and usually the compensatory lengthening of the vowel.

== Variation in modern-day English ==
=== Variation between /ɔːl/ and /ɒl/ before a consonant in salt and similar words ===
Some words such as salt, traditionally pronounced by most RP speakers with /ɔːl/ followed by a consonant, have alternative pronunciations with /ɒl/ that are used more frequently by younger British English speakers. The use of /ɒl/ in place of traditional /ɔːl/ is most common before voiceless consonants, as in salt, false and alter; less commonly, /ɒl/ may also be used in words where the /l/ comes before a voiced consonant, as in bald, scald and cauldron.

In Great Britain, the /ɒl/ pronunciation was traditionally associated with Northern England and Wales, but has in recent decades become more widespread, including among younger speakers of RP; it is now the overall majority pronunciation in British English before voiceless consonants, though still in the minority before voiced consonants.

The pronunciation with the lot vowel in such words is also found in Australia.

=== Modern L-vocalization ===
More extensive L-vocalization is a notable feature of certain dialects of English, including Cockney, Estuary English, New York English, New Zealand English, Pittsburgh and Philadelphia English, in which an /l/ sound occurring at the end of a word or before a consonant is pronounced as some sort of close back vocoid, e.g., [w], [o] or [ʊ]. The resulting sound may not always be rounded. The precise phonetic quality varies. It can be heard occasionally in the dialect of the English East Midlands, where words ending in -old can be pronounced /oʊd/. KM Petyt (1985) noted this feature in the traditional dialect of West Yorkshire but said it has died out. However, in recent decades l-vocalization has been spreading outwards from London and the south east, John C. Wells (1982) argued that it was probable that it would become the standard pronunciation in England over the next one hundred years, an idea which Petyt criticised in a book review.

In Cockney, Estuary English and New Zealand English, l-vocalization can be accompanied by phonemic mergers of vowels before the vocalized /l/, so that real, reel and rill, which are distinct in most dialects of English, are homophones as [ɹɪw].

Graham Shorrocks noted extensive L-vocalisation in the dialect of Bolton, Greater Manchester and commented, "many, perhaps, associate such a quality more with Southern dialects, than with Lancashire/Greater Manchester."

In the accent of Bristol, syllabic /l/ can be vocalized to /o/, resulting in pronunciations like /ˈbɒto/ (for bottle). By hypercorrection, however, some words originally ending in /o/ were given an /l/: the original name of the town was Bristow, but this has been altered by hypercorrection to Bristol.

African-American English (AAE) dialects may have L-vocalization as well. However, in these dialects, it may be omitted altogether (e.g. fool becomes [fuː]. Some English speakers from San Francisco – particularly those of Asian ancestry – also vocalize or omit /l/.

=== Salary–celery merger ===
The salary–celery merger is a conditioned merger of /æ/ (as in bat) and /ɛ/ (as in bet) when they occur before /l/, thus making salary and celery homophones. The merger is not well studied. It is referred to in various sociolinguistic publications, but usually only as a small section of the larger change undergone by vowels preceding /l/ in articles about l-vocalization.

This merger has been detected in the English spoken in New Zealand and in parts of the Australian state of Victoria, including the capital Melbourne. The merger is also found in the Norfuk dialect spoken on Norfolk Island. The salary-celery merger is also characteristic of Chicano English in Los Angeles and has been attested in the Chicano English of northern New Mexico and Albuquerque as well. /ɛ/ is also often lowered before /l/ in El Paso, but not all speakers show a merger. In varieties with the merger, salary and celery are both pronounced /sæləri/.

The study presented by Cox and Palethorpe at a 2003 conference tested just one group of speakers from Victoria: 13 fifteen-year-old girls from a Catholic girls' school in Wangaratta. Their pronunciations were compared with those of school girl groups in the towns of Temora, Junee and Wagga Wagga in New South Wales. In the study conducted by Cox and Palethorpe, the group in Wangaratta exhibited the merger while speakers in Temora, Junee and Wagga Wagga did not.

Deborah Loakes from Melbourne University has suggested that the salary-celery merger is restricted to Melbourne and southern Victoria, not being found in northern border towns such as Albury-Wodonga or Mildura.

In the 2003 study Cox and Palethorpe note that the merger appears to only involve lowering of /e/ before /l/, with the reverse not occurring, stating that "There is no evidence in this data of raised /æ/ before /l/ as in 'Elbert' for 'Albert', a phenomenon that has been popularly suggested for Victorians."

Horsfield (2001) investigates the effects of postvocalic /l/ on the preceding vowels in New Zealand English; her investigation covers all of the New Zealand English vowels and is not specifically tailored to studying mergers and neutralizations, but rather the broader change that occurs across the vowels. She has suggested that further research involving minimal pairs like telly and tally, celery and salary should be done before any firm conclusions are drawn.

A pilot study of the merger was done, which yielded perception and production data from a few New Zealand speakers. The results of the pilot survey suggested that although the merger was not found in the speech of all participants, those who produced a distinction between /æl/ and /el/ also accurately perceived a difference between them; those who merged /æl/ and /el/ were less able to accurately perceive the distinction. The finding has been interesting to some linguists because it concurs with the recent understanding that losing a distinction between two sounds involves losing the ability to produce it as well as to perceive it (Gordon 2002). However, due to the very small number of people participating in the study the results are not conclusive.

Homophonous pairs
/æl/	/ɛl/	IPA	Notes
Allan	Ellen	ælən	
bally	belly	bæli	
dally	Delhi	dæli	
dally	deli	dæli	
fallow	fellow	fæloʊ	
Hal	hell	hæl	
mallow	mellow	mæloʊ	
Sal	cel	sæl	
Sal	cell	sæl	
Sal	sell	sæl	
salary	celery	sæləri	
shall	shell	ʃæl	

=== Fill–feel merger ===
The areas marked in red are where the fill–feel merger is most consistently present in the local accent. Map based on Labov, Ash, and Boberg (2006: 71).

The fill–feel merger is a conditioned merger of the vowels /ɪ/ and /iː/ before /l/ that occurs in some accents. In Europe, it is commonly found in Estuary English. Otherwise it is typical of certain accents of American English. The heaviest concentration of the merger is found in, but not necessarily confined to, Southern American English: in North Carolina, eastern Tennessee, northern Alabama, Mississippi, northern and central Louisiana (but not New Orleans), and west-central Texas (Labov, Ash, and Boberg 2006: 69-73). This merger, like many other features of Southern American English, can also be found in AAE.

Homophonous pairs
/ɪl/	/iːl/	IPA	Notes
dill	deal	dɪl	
fill	feel	fɪl	
filled	field	fɪld	
hill	heal	hɪl	
hill	heel	hɪl	
hill	he'll	hɪl	
ill	eel	ɪl	
Jill	geal	dʒɪl	
kill	keel	kɪl	
lil	leal	lɪl	
lil	Lille	lɪl	
mill	meal	mɪl	
nil	kneel	nɪl	
nil	Neil	nɪl	
Phil	feel	fɪl	
pill	peal	pɪl	
pill	peel	pɪl	
rill	real	rɪl	
rill	reel	rɪl	
shill	she'll	ʃɪl	
shilled	shield	ʃɪld	
sill	ceil	sɪl	
sill	seal	sɪl	
silly	Seely	sɪli	
spill	spiel	spɪl	When spiel is not pronounced with initial /ʃ-/
still	steal	stɪl	
still	steel	stɪl	
till	teal	tɪl	
will	we'll	wɪl	
will	wheel	wɪl	With wine-whine merger.
willed	wield	wɪld	

=== Fell–fail merger ===
The same two regions show a closely related merger, namely the fell–fail merger of /ɛ/ and /eɪ/ before /l/ that occurs in some varieties of Southern American English making fell and fail homophones. In addition to North Carolina and Texas, these mergers are found sporadically in other Southern states and in the Midwest and West.

Homophonous pairs
/ɛl/	/eɪl/	IPA	Notes
bell	bail	bɛl	
bell	bale	bɛl	
belle	bail	bɛl	
belle	bale	bɛl	
cell, cel	sail	sɛl	
cell, cel	sale	sɛl	
dell	dale	dɛl	
ell	ail	ɛl	
ell	ale	ɛl	
fell	fail	fɛl	
gel	gaol, jail	dʒɛl	
geld	galed	gɛld	
held	hailed	hɛld	
hell	hail	hɛl	
hell	hale	hɛl	
knell	nail	nɛl	
L, ell	ail	ɛl	
L, ell	ale	ɛl	
Mel	mail	mɛl	
Mel	male	mɛl	
meld	mailed	mɛld	
Nell	nail	nɛl	
quell	quail	kwɛl	
sell	sail	sɛl	
sell	sale	sɛl	
shell	shale	ʃɛl	
swell	swale	swɛl	
tell	tail	tɛl	
tell	tale	tɛl	
weld	wailed	wɛld	
well	wail	wɛl	
well	wale	wɛl	
wells	wales	wɛlz	
wells	Wales	wɛlz	
well	whale	wɛl	With wine-whine merger.
wells	wails	wɛlz	
wells	whales	wɛlz	With wine-whine merger.
yell	Yale	jɛl	

=== Full–fool merger ===
The full–fool merger is a conditioned merger of /ʊ/ and /uː/ before /l/, making pairs like pull–pool and full–fool homophones. The main concentration of the pull–pool merger is in Western Pennsylvania English, centered around Pittsburgh. The merger is less consistently but still noticeably present in some speakers of surrounding Midland American English. The Atlas of North American English also reports this merger, or near-merger, scattered sporadically throughout Western American English, with particular prevalence in some speakers of urban Utahn, Californian, and New Mexican English. Accents with L-vocalization, such as New Zealand English, Estuary English and Cockney, may also have the full–fool merger in most cases, but when a suffix beginning with a vowel is appended, the distinction returns: Hence 'pull' and 'pool' are [pʊo], but 'pulling' is /ˈpʊlɪŋ/ whereas 'pooling' remains /ˈpuːlɪŋ/.

The fill–feel merger and full–fool merger are not unified in American English; they are found in different parts of the country, and very few people show both mergers.

Homophonous pairs
/ʊl/	/uːl/	IPA (using ⟨uː⟩ for the merged vowel)
bull	boule	buːl
full	fool	fuːl
pull	pool	puːl

=== Hull–hole merger ===
The hull–hole merger is a conditioned merger of /ʌ/ and /oʊ/ before /l/ occurring for some speakers of English English with l-vocalization. As a result, "hull" and "hole" are homophones as [hɔʊ]. The merger is also mentioned by Labov, Ash, and Boberg (2006:72) as a merger before /l/ in North American English that might require further study (they refer to the merger as the equivalent bull–bowl). The latter merger can also involve /ʊ/ or /ə/ before /l/.

Homophonous pairs
/ʌl/	/oʊl/	/ʊl/	/əl/	IPA	Notes
adult	a dolt			əˈdʌlt	Adult as /əˈdʌlt/.
	bold	bulled		bʌld	
	bowl	bull		bʌl	
	bowled	bulled		bʌld	
culled	cold			kʌld	
cull	coal			kʌl	
cull	cole			kʌl	
cult	colt			kʌlt	
dull	dole			dʌl	
	foal	full		fʌl	
	foaled	fulled		fʌld	
	fold	fulled		fʌld	
gull	goal			ɡʌl	
hull	hole			hʌl	
hull	whole			hʌl	
hulled	hold			hʌld	
hulled	holed			hʌld	
mull	mole			mʌl	
mulled	mold			mʌld	
mulled	mould			mʌld	
null	gnoll			nʌl	
null	knoll			nʌl	
	pole	pull		pʌl	
	poll	pull		pʌl	
	Seminole		seminal	ˈsɛmɪnʌl	
skulled	scold			skʌld	
sull	sole			sʌl	
sull	soul			sʌl	
sulled	sold			sʌld	
sulled	soled			sʌld	
sulled	souled			sʌld	

=== Gulf–golf merger ===
The gulf–golf merger is the merger of the diaphonemes /ʌ/ and /ɒ/ before /lC/, where C denotes a consonant. It is attested in Australian English, in which it can co-occur with the doll–dole merger. In Australian English the result of this 2–3 way merger is [ɔ], the vowel of LOT.

Homophonous pairs
/ʌl/	/ɒl/	IPA (using ⟨ɒ⟩ for the merged vowel)	Notes
cult	colt	kɒlt	With the doll–dole merger
exult	exalt	ɪgˈzɒlt	
gulf	golf	gɒlf	

=== Doll–dole merger ===
The doll–dole merger is a conditioned merger for many Southern England English, Australian English and New Zealand English speakers, of /ɒ/ and /əʊ/ before syllable-final (or non-prevocalic) /l/, resulting in homophony between pairs like doll and dole. The distinction between /ɒ/ and /əʊ/ is maintained in derived forms containing prevocalic /l/, such as d[ɒ]lling herself up vs. d[ɒʊ]ling it out, which means that the underlying vowel is recoverable if the /l/ is morpheme-final, as in doll and dole. But when the /l/ is followed by a consonant within the same morpheme, as in solve, the distinction is not recoverable, potentially leading to homophonous pairs like moult and malt; this may be the cause, via hypercorrection, of pronunciations such as [səʊlv] for solve in place of RP [sɒlv].

Homophonous pairs
/ɒl/	/oʊl/	IPA (using ⟨ɒ⟩ for the merged vowel)	Notes
Balt	bolt	bɒlt	When Balt is not pronounced as /bɔːlt/ (Note: Words like Balt, halt, malt, paltry and vault can be pronounced with /ɒlt/ or /ɔːlt/ in British English, but the /ɒlt/ pronunciation is used by the majority of younger speakers, see #Variation between /ɔːl/ and /ɒl/ before a consonant in salt and similar words.)
doll	dole	dɒl	
halt	holt	hɒlt	When halt is not pronounced as /hɔːlt/
malt	moult	mɒlt	When malt is not pronounced as /mɔːlt/
moll	mole	mɒl	
paltry	poultry	pɒltri	When paltry is not pronounced as /pɔːltri/
poll	pole	pɒl	Already homophonous in dialects that pronounce poll as /poʊl/ (Note: Poll is variably pronounced as /pɒl/ and /poʊl/ in British English, while pole is always pronounced /poʊl/ by speakers without the merger.)
sol	sole	sɒl	
sol	soul	sɒl	
vol	vole	vɒl	
vault	volt	vɒlt	When vault is not pronounced as /vɔːlt/

=== GOAT split ===
The goat split is a process that has affected London dialects and Estuary English. In the first phase of the split, the diphthong of goat /əʊ/ developed an allophone [ɒʊ] before "dark" (nonprevocalic) /l/. Thus goal no longer had the same vowel as goat ([ɡɒʊɫ] vs. [ɡəʊʔ]). In the second phase, the diphthong [ɒʊ] spread to other forms of affected words. For example, the realization of rolling changed from [ˈɹəʊlɪŋ] to [ˈɹɒʊlɪŋ] on the model of roll [ɹɒʊɫ]. This led to the creation of a minimal pair for some speakers: wholly /ˈhɒʊli/ vs. holy /ˈhəʊli/ and thus to phonemicization of the split. The change from /əʊ/ to /ɒʊ/ in derived forms is not fully consistent; for instance, in Cockney, polar is pronounced with the /əʊ/ of goat even though it is derived from pole /ˈpɒʊl/.

In broad Cockney, the phonetic difference between the two phonemes may be rather small and they may be distinguished by nothing more than the openness of the first element, so that goat is pronounced [ɡɐɤʔ] whereas goal is pronounced [ɡaɤ].

=== GOOSE split ===
Similar to the Goat split, the Goose vowel has developed contrasting phonetic outcomes before /l/ in some Southeastern English dialects, exhibited by the pair ruler (measuring instrument), pronounced with a fronter vowel that can be transcribed [yː] or [ʉw], and ruler ('one who rules'), pronounced with a backer vowel that can be transcribed [uː], [ʊw] or [oː]. This contrast developed from an allophonic distribution where a back variant of the goose vowel is used before tautosyllabic /l/, as in rule /ˈruːl/ [ˈɹuːɫ], but a fronted variant closer to [yː] is used elsewhere, as in ruler (instrument) /ˈruː.lə/ [ˈɹyː.lə].

This distribution has become complicated by morphology in a way that is leading to a phonemic split in words with pre-vocalic /l/: those where the /l/ is stem-final are pronounced with the phonetically back vowel [uː] (as in ruler (monarch), a morphologically transparent derivative of rule), whereas those where the /l/ is stem-medial are pronounced with a fronted vowel [yː] (as in ruler (measuring instrument), which is treated as an unanalyzable unit). The difference in vowel quality is presumably accompanied by a difference in the pronunciation of the following /l/ ([ɫ] after [uː], [l] after [yː]).

The Goose split has spread out from South East England due to media influence, sometimes merging with pre-existing high-back vowels in other dialects such as the [ʊw] diphthong present in the words go, don't, won't and a few others in the West Midlands (a holdover from a historic toe-tow distinction). In those areas, there is a more robust contrast between the usual Goose vowel (approximately [ɵɥ]) in words like goose and through, a high back vowel [ʊw] in ghoul and don't, and a third vowel arising from l-vocalisation in words like gull which is often realised as [ɤw], and they are all better analysed as separate lexical sets.

A similar backing change has occurred in many North American dialects, but this has remained allophonic. For example, in California English, the Goose vowel is realized as a back vowel in words such as school where it is followed by /l/, but is fronted in words where it is not followed by /l/, such as new.

=== Fool–fall merger ===
For some English speakers in the UK, the vowels of goose and thought may be merged before dark syllable-final /l/ due to the phonetically raised pronunciation of the thought vowel in southern England (rather than [ɔː], the contemporary pronunciation of this vowel in Standard Southern British English is more accurately transcribed as [oː] or [ʊː]) in combination with the backing of the goose vowel before /l/ as part of the Goose split. This neutralization has been found to exist for clusters of speakers in the southern UK, especially for speakers from areas of the south coast and the Greater London area.

Homophonous pairs
GOOSE	THOUGHT	IPA (using ⟨oː⟩ for the merged vowel)
boule	ball	boːl
boule	bawl	boːl
cool	call	koːl
cruel	crawl	koːl
drool	drawl	droːl
fool	fall	foːl
ghoul	gall	goːl
ghoul	Gaul	goːl
pool	pall	poːl
pool	Paul	poːl
schooled	scald	skoːld
stool	stall	stoːl
tool	tall	toːl
Yule	yawl	joːl

=== Pre-l breaking ===
Pre-l breaking is the insertion of a schwa between certain vowels and word-final /l/. It results in words such as bile, file and guile rhyming with dial, trial and vial. This change increases the number of syllables in the word by one.

The insertion may occur in the following sequences:

- /-ˈeɪl/ (jail, sale, tail), leading to a merger with /-ˈeɪ.əl/ (betrayal, portrayal)
- /-ˈaɪl/ (pile, mile, guile), leading to a merger with /-ˈaɪ.əl/ (dial, trial, vail')
- /-ˈɔɪl/ (coil, soil, boil), leading to a merger with /-ˈɔɪ.əl/ (loyal, royal)
- /-ˈiːl/ (ceil, feel, steal), leading to a merger with /-ˈiː.əl/ (real, ideal)

One analysis of the change considers the above vowels to end with palatal glides (i.e., /ɛj/, /ɑj/, /oj/ and /ɪj/) and describes the anaptyxis of schwa as resulting from the difficulty of transition between /j/ and /l/.

Homophonous pairs
/l/	/əl/	IPA
file	phial	/ˈfaɪ.əl/
Nile	Niall	/ˈnaɪ.əl/
reel	real	/ˈriːəl/
Royle	royal	/ˈrɔɪ.əl/
vile	vial	/ˈvaɪ.əl/

=== Schwa elision ===
The opposite of pre-l breaking is the elision of schwa before /l/. This can occur in some accents, resulting in words such as cool, tool and ghoul rhyming with cruel, dual and duel. This change decreases the number of syllables in the word by one and occurs in the following sequences:

- /-ˈɔːl/ (all, drawl, haul), leading to a merger with /-ˈɔː.əl/ (withdrawal)
- /-ˈoʊl/ (bowl, coal, hole), leading to a merger with /-ˈoʊ.əl/ (Joel, Noel)
- /-ˈuːl/ (cool, ghoul, mewl), leading to a merger with /-ˈuː.əl/ (cruel, dual, duel)
- /-ˈaʊl/ (owl, scowl, etc.) and /-ˈaʊəl/ (bowel, dowel, Powell)
- /-ˈɜrl/ (girl, hurl, pearl) in rhotic accents, leading to a merger with /-ˈɜr.əl/ (referral).
- /-ˈɑrl/ (Carl, marl, etc.) in some rhotic father–bother merged accents, leading to a merger with /-ˈɑrəl/ (coral, moral).

Homophonous pairs
/l/	/əl/	IPA	Notes
Carl	coral	/ˈkɑrl/	
cowl	Cowell	/ˈkaʊl/	
howl	Howell	/ˈhaʊl/	
Joule	dual	/ˈdʒuːl/	with yod-coalescence
jewel	duel	/ˈdʒuːl/	with yod-coalescence
Joule	jewel	/ˈdʒuːl/	
knoll	Noel	/ˈnoʊl/	

=== Merger of non-prevocalic /ʊl/, /uːl/, /əl/, /ɔːl/ with morpheme-internal /ɔː/ ===
Cockney features a THOUGHT-split whereby the /ɔː/ (the THOUGHT-NORTH-FORCE vowel) is pronounced differently depending on its position in the syllable structure: [oː] in morpheme-internal checked syllables and [ɔə] in free syllables or morpheme-finally. Thus, paw ([pɔə]) has a different vowel from pause ([poːz]), so paws ([pɔəz]) and pause ([poːz]) become non-homophonous.

The L-vocalization of Cockney can lead to non-prevocalic /l/ being pronounced with a quality around [o], resulting in it being entirely absorbed by the preceding [oː] when it follows a (by definition, morpheme-internal checked syllable) THOUGHT vowel in words such as bald, call and Paul, leading to homophonous pairs such as bald and board ([boːd]), called and cord ([koːd]), Paul's and pause ([poːz]).

Such homophones can only arise when the word without a historic /l/ also has the THOUGHT-NORTH-FORCE vowel in a morpheme-internal position, as in morpheme-final positions it will be pronounced as [ɔə] rather than [oː], thus Paul's ([poːz]) and paws ([pɔəz]), bald ([boːd]) and bored ([bɔəd]) etc remain distinct.

The full–fool and fool–fall mergers, both of which are common in Cockney, can cause /ʊl/ and /uːl/ to also merge with morpheme-internal /ɔː/, leading to homophonous pairs such as wolf and wharf [woːf] and cools and cause [koːz]; and pulls, pools, Paul's and pause all becoming homophonous as [poːz].

Non-prevocalic /əl/ (as in bottle) can also merge with morpheme-internal /ɔː/, leading to musical being homophonous with music hall as [ˈmjuːzɪkoː]. Cockney speakers usually regard both syllables of awful as rhyming: [ˈoːfoː].

In the following list, the only homophonous pairs that are included are those involving a word with /l/ and a word without. As the merger is restricted to non-rhotic accents, morpheme-internal /ɔː/ in the fifth column is assumed to cover not only THOUGHT but also NORTH and FORCE.

Potentially homophonous pairs
/ʊl/	/uːl/	/ɔːl/	Morpheme-internal /ɔː/	IPA (using ⟨oː⟩ for the merged vowel)	Notes
		Alt	ought	ˈoːt	When alt is not pronounced /ˈɒlt/
		assault	assort	ˈoːt	When assault is not pronounced /əˈsɒlt/
		Balt	bought	ˈboːt	When Balt is not pronounced /ˈbɒlt/
bulled		bald	board	ˈboːd	
		baldy	bawdy	ˈboːdi	
bulled		balled	board	ˈboːd	
bulled		bawled	board	ˈboːd	
		brawled	broad	ˈbroːd	
	coolled	called	cord	ˈkoːd	
	cools	calls	cause	ˈkoːz	
		false	force	ˈfoːs	When false is not pronounced /ˈfɒls/
		fault	fort	ˈfoːt	When fault is not pronounced /ˈfɒlt/
		fault	fought	ˈfoːt	When fault is not pronounced /ˈfɒlt/
		fault	thought	ˈfoːt	With th-fronting, when fault is not pronounced /ˈfɒlt/.
		faulty	forty	ˈfoːti	When faulty is not pronounced /ˈfɒlti/
fulled	fooled		ford	ˈfoːd	
		galled	gourd	ˈgoːd	With cure-force merger
		halls	Hawes	ˈhoːz	
		hauls	Hawes	ˈhoːz	
		hauled	hoard	ˈhoːd	
		Malden	Morden	ˈmoːdən	
		malt	mort	ˈmoːt	When malt is not pronounced /ˈmɒlt/
		Malta	mortar	ˈmoːtə	When malt is not pronounced /ˈmɒltə/
		mauled	Maud	ˈmoːt	When malt is not pronounced /ˈmɒlt/
pulls	pools	Paul's	pause	ˈpoːz	
		salt	sort	ˈsoːt	When salt is not pronounced /ˈsɒlt/
		salt	sought	ˈsoːt	When salt is not pronounced /ˈsɒlt/
wolf			wharf	ˈwoːf	
		Walt	wart	ˈwoːt	When Walt is not pronounced /ˈwɒlt/
		Walter	water	ˈwoːtə	When Walter is not pronounced /ˈwɒltə/

=== Other mergers ===
Labov, Ash, and Boberg (2006:73) mention four mergers before /l/ that may be under way in some accents of North American English, and which require more study:

- bull /ʊl/ and bowl /oʊl/ (see the hull–hole merger)
- bull /ʊl/ and hull /ʌl/ (effectively undoing the FOOT–STRUT split before /l/)
- hull /ʌl/ and bowl /oʊl/ (an extension of the two aforementioned mergers)
- hull /ʌl/ and hall /ɔːl/ (similar to the gulf–golf merger)

== See also ==
- Phonological history of English
- Phonological history of English vowels
- English-language vowel changes before historic r

== Bibliography ==
- Gordon, Elizabeth; Maclagan, Margaret (2004), "Regional and social differences in New Zealand: phonology", in Schneider, Edgar W.; Burridge, Kate; Kortmann, Bernd; Mesthrie, Rajend; Upton, Clive (eds.), A handbook of varieties of English, vol. 1: Phonology, Mouton de Gruyter, pp. 603–613, doi:10.1515/9783110197181-039, ISBN 3-11-017532-0
- Horsfield, Rachel (2001). The Changing Vowels of New Zealand English (Thesis). University of Otago.
- Labov, William; Ash, Sharon; Boberg, Charles (2006). The Atlas of North American English. Berlin: Mouton de Gruyter. ISBN 978-3-11-016746-7.
- Wells, John C. (1982). Accents of English. Cambridge: Cambridge University Press. ISBN 9780521246484.
