= Pronunciation of English ⟨wh⟩ =

Digraph representing a sound that has changed

The pronunciation of the English digraph ⟨wh⟩ in words like which or whale has changed over time, and still varies today between different regions and accents. It is now most commonly pronounced with the voiced approximant /w/, which is also found in words like witch or wail, although some varieties of English, particularly those of Scotland, Ireland, and the Southern United States, retain the traditional voiceless aspirated pronunciation generally transcribed /ʍ/ or /hw/. (Note: /ʍ/ is preferred in many linguistics texts such as Collins & Mees, while /hw/ is often found in dictionaries.) The process by which the historical /ʍ/ has become /w/ in most modern varieties of English is called the wine–whine merger.

Before rounded vowels, a different process took place in Middle English, as a result of which the ⟨wh⟩ in words like who and whom is now pronounced /h/. (A similar sound change occurred earlier in the word how.)

== History ==
=== Origins ===
What is now English ⟨wh⟩ originated as the Proto-Indo-European consonant *kʷ (whose reflexes came to be written ⟨qu⟩ in Latin and the Romance languages). In the Germanic languages, in accordance with Grimm's Law, Indo-European voiceless stops became voiceless fricatives in most environments. Thus the labialized velar stop *kʷ initially became presumably a labialized velar fricative *xʷ in pre-Proto-Germanic, then probably becoming *w̥ – a voiceless labio-velar approximant – in Proto-Germanic proper. The sound was used in Gothic and represented by the letter hwair. In Old High German, it was written as ⟨huu⟩, a spelling also used in Old English along with ⟨hƿ⟩ (using the letter wynn). In Middle English the spelling was changed to ⟨hw⟩ (with the development of the letter ⟨w⟩) and then ⟨wh⟩, but the pronunciation remained [w̥].

=== Developments before rounded vowels ===
Before rounded vowels, such as /uː/ or /oː/, there was a tendency, beginning in the Old English period, for the sound /h/ to become labialized, causing it to sound like /hw/. Words with an established /hw/ in that position came to be perceived (and spelt) as beginning with plain /h/. This occurred with the interrogative word how (Proto-Germanic *hwō, Old English hū).

A similar process of labialization of /h/ before rounded vowels occurred in the Middle English period, around the 15th century, in some dialects. Some words which historically began with /h/ came to be written ⟨wh⟩ (whole, whore). Later in many dialects /hw/ was delabialized to /h/ in the same environment, regardless of whether the historic pronunciation was /h/ or /hw/ (in some other dialects the labialized /h/ was reduced instead to /w/, leading to such pronunciations as the traditional Kentish /woʊm/ for home). This process affected the pronoun who and its inflected forms. These had escaped the earlier reduction to /h/ because they had unrounded vowels in Old English, but by Middle English the vowel had become rounded, and so the /hw/ of these words was now subject to delabialization:

- who – Old English hwā, Modern English /huː/
- whom – Old English hwǣm, Modern English /huːm/
- whose – Old English hwās, Modern English /huːz/

By contrast with how, these words changed after their spelling with ⟨wh⟩ had become established, and thus continue to be written with ⟨wh⟩ like the other interrogative words which, what, etc. (which were not affected by the above changes since they had unrounded vowels – the vowel of what became rounded at a later time).

== Wine–whine merger ==
Distinction between w and wh
A New England pronunciation
of wine, whine
[waɪn w̥aɪn]

The area indicated shows the areas in the southeastern United States with the greatest contrast between /hw/ and /w/. In most other areas of the United States, the pronunciations have merged.

The wine–whine merger is the phonological merger by which /hw/ came to be pronounced the same as /w/, with both being a voiced labio-velar approximant [w]. John C. Wells refers to this process as glide cluster reduction. It causes the distinction to be lost between the pronunciation of ⟨wh⟩ and that of ⟨w⟩, so pairs of words like wine/whine, wet/whet, weather/whether, wail/whale, Wales/whales, wear/where, witch/which become homophones. This merger has taken place in the dialects of the great majority of English speakers.

The merger seems to have been present in the south of England as early as the 13th century. It was unacceptable in educated speech until the late 18th century, but there is no longer generally any stigma attached to either pronunciation. In the late nineteenth century, Alexander John Ellis found that /hw/ was retained in all wh- words throughout Cumbria, Northumberland, Scotland and the Isle of Man, but the distinction was largely absent throughout the rest of England.

The merger is essentially complete in England, Wales, the West Indies, South Africa, Australia, and in the speech of young speakers in New Zealand. However, some conservative RP speakers in England may use /hw/ for ⟨wh⟩, a conscious choice rather than a natural feature of their accent.

The merger is not found in Scotland, most of Ireland (although the distinction is usually lost in Belfast and some other urban areas of Northern Ireland), and in the speech of older speakers in New Zealand. The distribution of the wh- sound in words does not always exactly match the standard spelling; for example, Scots pronounce whelk (also sometimes spelled welk) with plain /w/, while in many regions weasel has the wh- sound.

Most speakers in the United States and Canada have the merger. According to Labov, Ash, and Boberg (2006: 49), using data collected in the 1990s, there are regions of the U.S. (particularly in the Southeast) in which speakers keeping the distinction are about as numerous as those having the merger, but there are no regions in which the preservation of the distinction is predominant (see map). Throughout the U.S. and Canada, about 83% of respondents in the survey had the merger completely, while about 17% preserved at least some trace of the distinction.

The following table shows correspondences which can be homophones where the merge is observed, or minimal pairs where it is not. In some varieties of English, other factors such as variant vowels may create other distinctions.

Minimal or Homophonous pairs
/w/	/hw/	IPA	Notes
wack	whack	ˈwæk	
wail	whale	ˈweɪl	With pane–pain merger
wale	whale	ˈweɪl, ˈweːl	
Wales	whales	ˈweɪlz, ˈweːlz	
wang	whang	ˈwæŋ	
ware / wear	where	ˈwɛː(r), ˈweːr	
wary	wherry	ˈwɛri	With Mary-marry-merry merger
watt	what	ˈwɒt	
way / weigh	whey	ˈweɪ	weigh with wait–weight merger
weal	wheel	ˈwiːl	
weather	whether	ˈwɛðə(r)	
we'll	wheel	ˈwiːl	
welp	whelp	ˈwɛlp	
wen	when	ˈwɛn	
were	whir	ˈwɜː(r)	
wet	whet	ˈwɛt	
wether	whether	ˈwɛðə(r)	
wide	why'd	ˈwaɪd	
wield	wheeled	ˈwiːld	
wig	whig	ˈwɪɡ	
wight	white	ˈwaɪt	
wile	while	ˈwaɪl	
win	when	ˈwɪn	With pin-pen merger
win	whin	ˈwɪn	
wince	whence	ˈwɪns	With pin-pen merger
wind (verb)	whined	ˈwaɪnd	
wine	whine	ˈwaɪn	
wined	whined	ˈwaɪnd	
wire	why're	ˈwaɪə(r)	
wise	why's	ˈwaɪz	
wish	whish	ˈwɪʃ	
wit	whit	ˈwɪt	
witch	which	ˈwɪtʃ	
wither	whither	ˈwɪðə(r)	
woe	whoa	ˈwoʊ, ˈwoː	
word	whirred	ˈwɜː(r)d	With nurse merger
world	whirled / whorled	ˈwɜː(r)ld	With nurse merger
Y; wye	why	ˈwaɪ	

== Realizations of the wh phoneme when distinct ==
In varieties of current English that did not experience the wine-whine merger, ⟨w⟩ and ⟨wh⟩ are distinct phonemes, as demonstrated by such minimal pairs as wear:where, Wales:whales, witch:which. In these varieties, the phoneme represented by ⟨wh⟩ is usually transcribed /ʍ/ or /hw/.

This /ʍ/ is most often realized as a voiceless labio-velar approximant [w̥]. As with the /w/ phoneme, the lips are rounded and the tongue is back, but /ʍ/ is distinct in that it is unvoiced, there is a greater fortis lip-tension, and the sound is also more heavily aspirated, to the extent that a puff of air can be felt if a hand is held in front of the mouth. In EFL contexts, it is often likened to the sound one might make when blowing out a candle.

In some accents, /ʍ/ is a consonant cluster [hw̥], which involves a pre-aspiration of [w̥]. In some Scottish dialects, this may be closer to [xw̥] or [kw̥], where the [w̥] sound is preceded by a voiceless velar fricative or stop. Pronunciations of the [xw̥] or [kw̥] type are reflected in the former Scots spelling quh- (as in quhen for when, quhite for white, etc.).

In the Doric of North-East Scotland, /hw/ has merged with the voiceless labiodental fricative /f/. Thus whit ("what") is pronounced /fɪt/, whan ("when") becomes /fan/, and whine becomes /fain/ (a homophone of fine). This is also found in some Irish English with an Irish Gaelic substrate influence (which has led to a re-borrowing of whisk(e)y as Irish Gaelic fuisce, the word having originally entered English from Scottish Gaelic).

In the Black Isle, /hw/ (like /h/) is traditionally not pronounced at all.

== Wh-words ==
Proto-Indo-European had a set of pronouns beginning with *kʷ which served both as interrogatives and as relative pronouns. In Latin and the Romance languages, these typically begin with ⟨qu-⟩, and in English they mostly begin with ⟨wh-⟩: who, which, what, when, where etc. These are often referred to as wh-words, questions formed from them are called wh-questions, and a common grammatical phenomenon affecting their syntax is called wh-movement. English-speaking linguists sometimes use this terminology in cross-language contexts, even though the languages under discussion do not have ⟨wh-⟩ in these words.

== See also ==
- Phonological history of English consonants
- Phonological history of English consonant clusters

== Bibliography ==
- Collins, Beverley; Mees, Inger (2003). Practical Phonetics and Phonology.
