= Zulu English =

Variety of English

Zulu English is a variety of English, spoken almost exclusively in South Africa among the Zulu. The variety is heavily influenced by the phonology and lexicon of the Zulu language.

== Phonology ==
- The met–mate merger is a phenomenon occurring for some speakers of Zulu English where /eɪ/ and /ɛ/ are both pronounced /ɛ/. As a result, the words "met" and "mate" are homophonous as /mɛt/.
- The cot–coat merger is a phenomenon occurring for some speakers of Zulu English where the phonemes /ɒ/ and /əʊ/ are not distinguished.
- Confusion between /ʃ/ and /tʃ/ also occurs: it is reported that /tʃ/ is sometimes replaced by /ʃ/, so ship may be pronounced like chip.
- Devoicing of certain obstruents, particularly /b, d, g, dʒ, z/.

== Bibliography ==
- Wade, Rodrik D. (1996). "Structural characteristics of Zulu English". An Investigation of the Putative Restandardisation of South African English in the Direction of a 'New' English, Black South African English (Thesis). Durban: University of Natal. Archived from the original on 13 October 2008.
