= Tacumshane =

Tacumshane Teach Coimseáin
- Village
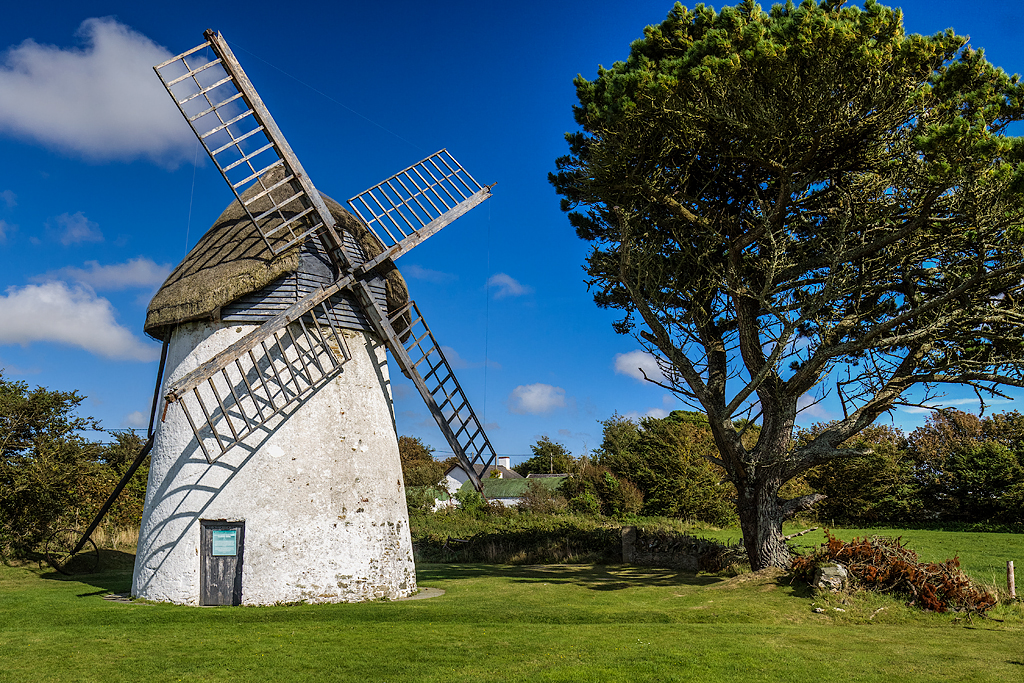
- Tacumshane Windmill

- Location in Ireland
- Coordinates: 52°12′32″N 6°25′23″W
- Country: Ireland
- Province: Leinster
- County: County Wexford
- Elevation: 24 m (79 ft)
- Time zone: UTC+0 (WET)
  - Summer (DST): UTC-1 (IST (WEST))
- Irish Grid Reference: T078074

Tacumshane or Tacumshin (Irish: Teach Coimseáin) is a small village and civil parish in the southeast of County Wexford, Ireland. It is located 15 km south of Wexford town.

== Name ==
The official name of the village is Tacumshane. In Irish it is called Teach Coimseáin (House of Seán). In Yola it is listed as "tagh caam seain", meaning in modern English the "crooked house of John". The name of the village is often pronounced as "Tacumshin" as opposed to "Tacumshane", while the village and parish are spelled "Tacumshane". The lake and townland are also spelled "Tacumshin", perhaps following more closely the Yola pronunciation, as historically Irish had not been spoken in this part of Wexford since the 11th century where Yola was the de facto language.

About two miles away is the townland of Churchtown which was once called Tacumshane. It is where Tacumshane castle stood until it was demolished in 1984 by a local farmer. The village of Tacumshane, today, spans the townlands of Fence and Ballyhiho.

== Tacumshane Windmill ==
The windmill at Tacumshane was built in 1846 by Nicolas Moran and was used until 1936, making it the last windmill in the Ireland to work commercially. The windmill was one of 36 such windmills dotted throughout the baronies of Forth and Bargy. Forth and Bargy had a higher concentration of windmills than other parts of Ireland, and the Tacumshane windmill is the only surviving example of its kind in the country. It was renovated in the 1950s and is the oldest working windmill in Ireland. Access is managed via the nearby pub, "The Millhouse Bar".

== Lake ==
Tacumshin Lake is 1100 acres in size. It is designated a Special Protection Area (SPA) and a Special Area of Conservation by the National Parks and Wildlife Service. Cut off from sea since 1972 by a barrier of dune, a tidal system know locally as "the tunnel" was constructed in the 1970s making the lake tidal. A new system was built in the 1990s. Tachumshin Lake is commonly visited by bird watchers and attracts some rare American waders in Autumn, as well as internationally important concentrations of Bewick's swans, Brent geese, wigeon, oystercatchers, golden plover and lapwing.

== Transport ==
Bus Éireann route 378 serves Tacumshane on Fridays only and provides a link to and from Wexford. Its terminus is at Wexford railway station.

== People ==
- John Barry (1745–1803), is sometimes credited as the "Father of the American Navy". Born in a rented thatched farmstead, in the townland of Ballysampson, he emigrated in the 1760s and was appointed a captain in the Continental Navy in December 1775.
- John Meyler (born 1956 in Tacumshane) is an Irish hurling manager and former player. He played hurling with his local clubs Our Lady's Island and St. Finbarr's and with the Wexford and Cork senior inter-county teams from 1973 until 1987. Meyler later managed several inter-county teams.

== See also ==
- List of towns and villages in Ireland
