= English languages =

English languages may refer to:

- Anglic languages, a linguistic family comprised Old English and its descendants
- English dialects, varieties of Modern English
  - World Englishes
- Languages of England

== See also ==
- English language
- Fingallian
- Languages of England
- Scots language
- Yola (language)
