= Irish Anglo-Norman =

Irish Anglo-Norman or Irish Anglo-Normans may refer to:

- Normans in Ireland/Hiberno-Normans, a group of Normans descended from Cambro-Normans and Anglo-Normans who invaded Ireland in the late 12th century
  - Fingallian, a relict of the Middle English dialect spoken by the Hiberno-Normans in Fingal
  - The Yola language, a relict of the Middle English dialect spoken by the Hiberno-Normans in County Wexford
