= Taghmon (disambiguation) =

Taghmon or Taughmon is a place name and may refer to:

== Places in Ireland ==
=== County Westmeath ===
- Taghmon (civil parish), a civil parish of the barony of Corkaree
- Taghmon (townland, County Westmeath), a townland in Taghmon civil parish, barony of Corkaree
- Crookedwood, a small village, historically called Taghmon after the townland it occupies

=== County Wexford ===
- Taghmon, a village
- Taghmon (civil parish, County Wexford), a civil parish spanning the baronies of Bargy and Shelmaliere West
- Taghmon (Parliament of Ireland constituency), abolished 1801

== See also ==
- Fintán of Taghmon
- Taughmonagh
