= List of Irish words used in the English language =

Irish language words used in English in modern Ireland without being assimilated to English forms include:

- Amhrán na bhFiann: National Anthem of Ireland (literally "Soldiers Song")
  - pronounced [ˈəuɾˠaːnˠ n̪ˠə ˈvʲiən̪ˠ]
- Áras an Uachtaráin: Residence of the President
  - pronounced [ˈaːɾˠəsˠ ən̪ˠ ˈuəxt̪ˠəɾˠaːnʲ]
- Ardfheis: Party conference (used by Fine Gael although they also have smaller national conferences, Fianna Fáil, Fine Gael and Sinn Féin)
  - pronounced [ˌaːɾˠd̪ˠ ˈɛʃ]
- Ard-Rí: High King (title used in the Middle Ages)
  - pronounced [ˈaːɾˠd̪ˠˌɾˠiː]
- Bord Fáilte: Irish Tourist Board (literally "Welcome Board"; now called Fáilte Ireland)
  - pronounced [ˌbˠoːɾˠd̪ˠ ˈfˠaːl̠ʲtʲə]
- Bord Gáis: National gas and electricity supply network (literally meaning "Gas Board"; now called Bord Gáis Energy)
- Bunreacht na hÉireann: Constitution of Ireland
  - pronounced [ˈbˠʊn̪ˠɾʲəxt̪ˠ n̪ˠə ˈheːɾʲən̪ˠ]
- Ceann Comhairle: Chairman of Dáil Éireann
  - pronounced [ˌcaːn̪ˠ ˈkoːɾˠl̠ʲə]
- Córas Iompair Éireann: Irish Transport Company (CIÉ)
  - pronounced [ˈkoːɾˠəsˠ ˈʊmˠpˠəɾʲ ˈeːɾʲən̪ˠ]
- Dáil Éireann: House of Representatives (lower house of the Irish Parliament)
  - pronounced [ˌd̪ˠaːlʲ ˈeːɾʲən̪ˠ]
- Éire: Ireland
  - pronounced [ˈeːɾʲə]
- Fianna Fáil: Irish political party (literally "Soldiers of Destiny")
  - pronounced [ˌfʲiən̪ˠə ˈfˠaːlʲ]
- Fine Gael: Irish political party (literally "Family of the Gael")
  - pronounced [ˌfʲɪnʲə ˈɡeːlˠ]
- Gaeltacht: Irish-speaking area
  - pronounced [ˈɡeːl̪ˠt̪ˠəxt̪ˠ]
- Garda: police officer (plural Gardaí)
  - pronounced [ˈɡaːɾˠd̪ˠə], pl. pronounced [ˈɡaːɾˠd̪ˠiː]
- Garda Síochána: Irish police service (literally "Guardian of the Peace")
  - pronounced [ˈɡaːɾˠd̪ˠə ˈʃiːxaːnˠə n̪ˠə ˈheːɾʲən̪ˠ]
- Oireachtas: (National Parliament)
  - pronounced [ˈɛɾʲaxt̪ˠəsˠ]
- Príomh Aire: Prime Minister (1919–1921 only)
  - pronounced [ˌpʲɾʲiːw ˈaɾʲə]
- Punt: Irish pound (currency, now replaced by the euro)
  - [pˠʊn̪ˠt̪ˠ]
- Raidió Teilifís Éireann: National broadcasting service (RTÉ)
  - pronounced [ˈɾˠadʲiːoː ˈtʲɛlʲəfʲiːʃ ˈeːɾʲən̪ˠ]
- Saorstát Éireann: Irish Free State
  - pronounced [ˈsˠiːɾˠsˠt̪ˠaːt̪ˠ ˈeːɾʲən̪ˠ]
- Seanad Éireann: Irish Senate (upper house of the Irish Parliament)
  - pronounced [ˈʃanˠəd̪ˠ ˈeːɾʲən̪ˠ]
- Sinn Féin: Irish political party (literally "Our-selves")
  - pronounced [ˌʃɪn̠ʲ ˈfʲeːnʲ]
- Sliotar: Ball used in hurling (see Gaelic Athletic Association)
  - pronounced [ˈʃl̠ʲɪt̪ˠəɾˠ]
- Tánaiste: Deputy Prime Minister
  - pronounced [ˈt̪ˠaːnˠəʃtʲə]
- Taoiseach: Prime Minister (literally "Chieftain")
  - pronounced [ˈt̪ˠiːʃəx]
- Teachta Dála: Member of the lower house of Parliament (TD)
  - pronounced [ˌtʲaxt̪ˠə ˈd̪ˠaːlˠə]
- Uachtarán na hÉireann: President of Ireland
  - pronounced [ˈuəxt̪ˠəɾˠaːn̪ˠ n̪ˠə ˈheːɾʲən̪ˠ]
- Údarás na Gaeltachta: Development Authority for the Gaeltacht
  - pronounced [ˈuːd̪ˠəɾˠaːsˠ n̪ˠə ˈɡeːl̪ˠt̪ˠəxt̪ˠə]

Other, more informal terms include:

- Ara - Aye (filler word)
- Ar mo leabhar breac –On my book/I kid you not. (Used as a filler in Kerry)
- banshee – bean sí.
- barmbrack An Irish fruit loaf. From Irish ó bairín breac, speckled loaf.
- bodhrán – A winnowing drum used as a musical instrument.
- bog – (from bogach meaning "marsh/peatland") a wetland (according to OED).
- bonnaught – A type of billeting or a billeted soldier. From Irish buannacht, billeting or billeting tax.
- boreen – (from bóithrín meaning "small road") a narrow rural road in Ireland.
- brat – a cloak or overall; now only in regional dialects (from Old Irish bratt meaning "cloak, cloth")
- brehon – A judge of ancient Irish law. From Irish breitheamh.
- brogue – (from bróg meaning "shoe") a type of shoe (OED).
- brogue – A strong regional accent, especially an Irish
- callow – A river meadow, a landing-place, from Irish caladh.
- camogie – From Irish camóg, small hooked object, a camogue. The women's equivalent of hurling.
- carrageen – moss. From Irish carraigín, "little rock".
- carrow – An ancient Irish gambler, from cearrbhach.
- caubeen – An Irish beret, adopted as part of the uniform of Irish regiments of the British Army. From cáibín.
- clabber – also bonny-clabber (from clábar and bainne clábair) curdled milk.
- clarsach – An ancient Irish and Scottish harp, from Irish cláirseach.
- clock – O.Ir. clocc meaning "bell". Probably entered Germanic via the hand-bells used by early Irish missionaries.
- coccagee – The name of a type of cider apple found in Ireland, so-called for its green colour. From cac na gé meaning "goose shit".
- colcannon – A kind of ‘bubble and squeak’. Probably from cál ceannfhionn, white-headed cabbage.
- colleen – (from cailín meaning "a girl").
- conk – Slang term for a big nose. The term Old Conky was a nickname for the Duke of Wellington. Dinneen gives coinncín as "a prominent nose" and this seems to be related to terms like geanc, meaning a snub nose.
- coshering – Nothing to do with Jewish dietary law. Coshering (from Irish cóisir, feast) was when a lord went round staying with his subjects and expecting to be entertained. Because of this cóisireacht can mean "sponging" in Modern Irish, though cóisir usually just means a party.
- coyne – A kind of billeting, from Irish coinmheadh.
- crock – As in 'A crock of gold', from Irish cnoc.
- cross – The ultimate source of this word is Latin crux. The English word comes from Old Irish cros via Old Norse kross.
- crubeens - Pig's feet, from Irish crúibín.
- cudeigh – A night's lodging, from Irish cuid na hoíche.
- currach or curragh – An Irish boat made from skins or tarred canvas stretched over a wooden frame. Irish currach.
- drum, drumlin – from Irish droim, droimlín. A ridge or small hill of glacial origin, such as in the landscape of Down.
- drisheen – is a type of black pudding associated with Cork. From drisín.
- dudeen – A clay pipe, from Irish dúidín.
- dulse – From Irish duileasc, originally meaning water leaf. A type of edible seaweed.
- erenagh – A hereditary holder of church lands. Irish aircheannach.
- esker – From eiscir, an elongated ridge of post-glacial gravel, usually along a river valley (OED).
- Fenian – From Fianna meaning "semi-independent warrior band", a member of a 19th-century Irish nationalist group (OED).
- fiacre – a small four-wheeled carriage for hire, a hackney-coach, associated with St Fiacre in the area of Paris. Named for Saint Fiachra.
- fiorin – A type of long grass, derived from Irish feorthainn.
- Gallowglass – (from gallóglach) a Scottish or Irish Gaelic mercenary soldier in Ireland between the mid-13th and late-16th centuries.
- galore – (from go leor meaning "plenty") a lot.
- gillaroo – A type of fish. From Irish giolla rua, red lad.
- glib – An obsolete term for a kind of haircut associated with warriors (because it protected the forehead) banned by the English. Irish glib, fringe.
- glom – (from glám) To become too attached to someone.
- gob – (literally beak) mouth. From Irish gob. (OED)
- grouse – In slang sense of grumble, perhaps from gramhas, meaning grin, grimace, ugly face.
- griskin – (from griscín) a lean cut of meat from the loin of a pig, a chop.
- hooligan – (from the Irish family name Ó hUallacháin, anglicised as Hooligan or Hoolihan).
- keening – From caoinim (meaning "I wail") to lament, to wail mournfully (OED).
- kern – An outlaw or a common soldier. From ceithearn or ceithearnach, still the word in Irish for a pawn in chess.
- Leprechaun – a fairy or spirit (from leipreachán)
- Limerick – (from Luimneach). The limerick form was particularly associated in the 18th century with a group of Irish language poets called Filí na Máighe.
- lough – (from loch) a lake, or arm of the sea.
- madder, mether – A traditional square-sided wooden drinking vessel, Irish meadar.
- merrow – An Irish mermaid. Irish murúch.
- moiley – An ancient breed of Irish hornless cattle, from maol, bald or hornless.
- Muise - Indeed (often spelled Musha), used to emphasise a point.
- ogham – Ancient Irish alphabet. The Irish is also ogham (pronounced oh-um).
- omadhaun - A fool, from Irish amadán.
- orrery – A mechanical model of solar system, named for the Earl of Orrery. This is an old Irish tribal name, Orbhraighe.
- pampootie – From pampúta, a kind of shoe with good grip worn by men in the Aran Islands.
- phoney – (probably from the English fawney meaning "gilt brass ring used by swindlers", which is from Irish fáinne meaning "ring") fake.
- pinkeen – From pincín, a minnow or an insignificant person. This in turn comes from English pink + Irish diminutive –ín.
- pollan – A fish found in Irish loughs, from Irish pollán.
- pookawn – A fishing boat, from Irish púcán.
- poteen – (from poitín) hooch, bootleg alcoholic drink.
- puck – (in hockey) Almost certainly from Irish poc, according to the OED.
- puss – As in sourpuss, comes from Irish pus, a pouting mouth.
- rapparee – An Irish highwayman, from ropaire (a stabber)
- rath – A strong circular earthen wall forming an enclosure and serving as a fort and residence for a tribal chief. From Irish rath.
- shamrock – (from seamróg) a shamrock, diminutive of seamair, clover, used as a symbol for Ireland.
- Shan Van Vocht – (from seanbhean bhocht meaning "poor old woman") a literary name for Ireland in the 18th and 19th centuries.
- shebeen – (from síbín meaning "illicit whiskey, poteen", apparently a diminutive of síob, which means drift, blow, ride) unlicensed house selling alcohol (OED).
- shillelagh – (from sail éille meaning "a beam with a strap") a wooden club or cudgel made from a stout knotty stick with a large knob on the end.
- shoneen – A West Brit, an Irishman who apes English customs. From Irish Seoinín, a little John (in a Gaelic version of the English form, Seon, not the Irish Seán).
- Sidhe (Modern Sí) – the fairies, fairyland.
- slauntiagh – An obsolete word for sureties or guarantees, which comes from Irish sláinteacha with the same meaning.
- sleeveen, sleiveen – (from slíbhín) an untrustworthy or cunning person. Used in Ireland and Newfoundland (OED).
- slew – (from slua meaning "a large number") a great amount (OED).
- slob – (from slab) mud (OED).
- slug – (from slog) A swig of a drink, e.g. A slug of red eye
- smithereens – small fragments, atoms. In phrases such as "to explode into smithereens". This is the Irish word smidiríní. This is obviously Irish because of the –ín ending but the basic word seems to be Germanic, something to do with the work of a smith.
- spalpeen – A migratory labourer in Ireland. From spailpín.
- tanist – The deputy and successor of a chieftain or religious leader. A term used in anthropology. From Irish tánaiste, secondary person.
- tilly – (from tuilleadh meaning "a supplement") used in Newfoundland to refer to an additional luck-penny. It is used by James Joyce in the first chapter of Ulysses.
- tory – Originally an Irish outlaw, probably from the word tóraí meaning "pursuer".
- trousers – From Irish triús.
- turlough – A seasonal lake in limestone area (OED). Irish turloch "dry lake".
- uilleann pipes – Irish bellows-blown bagpipes. uilleann is Irish for "elbow".
- usker – From Irish uscar, a jewel sewn into an item of clothing.
- whiskey – From uisce beatha meaning "water of life".

Other words:

- Bualadh bos (A round of applause)
- Camán (hurley)
- Cipín (Small stick/firekindling)
- Coláiste (College e.g. Coláiste Dhúlaigh College of Further Education)
- Comhairle (Council e.g. An Chomhairle um Oideachas Gaeltachta & Gaelscolaíochta / COGG)
- Crúibín (Pigs foot)
- Cúpla focail (literally "a few words", to be able to speak a few words in Irish)
- Fáilte (Welcome)
- Fláithiúil (Excessively/uncommonly generous)
- Grá (Great love or affection for someone/something)
- Is maith liom (I like/It's good)
- Lúdramán (Fool)
- Lúdar (Fool)
- Mar dhea (Supposedly)
- Meas (High regard/respect for someone/something)
- Óinseach (Fool, generally female)
- Plámás (Excessive/Insincere praise or flattery)
- Sceach (Any thorny bush, sceach gheal (Hawthorn))
- Sin é (that's it)
- Sin sin - That's that
- Sláinte (Cheers|Good health)
- Slán (Safe, whole, healthy, complete) (Shortened version of go dté tu slán ("may you go safely"), used as modern equivalent of the French au revoir or English see you.)

== See also ==
- Craic, an English word that was adapted into Irish and then re-borrowed into English
- Hiberno-English
- Lists of English words of Celtic origin
- Place names in Ireland
