= Jacob Poole =

Irish antiquarian

- Born: 11 February 1774; Growtown, County Wexford
- Died: 20 November 1827 (aged 53)
- Occupation: Antiquarian

Jacob Poole (11 February 1774 – 20 November 1827) was an Irish antiquarian.

== Biography ==
Poole was the son of Joseph Poole and his wife Sarah, daughter of Jacob Martin of Aghfad, County Wexford. Poole was born in Growtown, County Wexford, 11 February 1774.

His parents were members of the Society of Friends, and he was seventh in descent from Thomas and Catherine Poole of Dortrope, Northamptonshire. Their son, Richard Poole, came to Ireland with the parliamentary army in 1649, turned quaker, was imprisoned for his religion at Wexford and Waterford, and died in Wexford gaol, to which he was committed for refusing to pay tithe in 1665.

Jacob succeeded to the family estate of Growtown, in the parish of Taghmon, in 1800, and farmed his own land. He studied the customs and language of the baronies of Bargy and Forth, on the edge of the former of which his estate lay. The inhabitants used to speak an old English dialect, dating from the earliest invasion of the country, and he collected the words and phrases of this expiring language from his tenants and labourers.

This collection was edited by the William Barnes from the original manuscript, and published in 1867 as ‘A Glossary, with some pieces of verse, of the old dialect of the English Colony in the Baronies of Forth and Bargy.’ The glossary contains about fifteen hundred words, noted with great fidelity. The dialect is now extinct, and this glossary, with a few words in Holinshed and some fragments of verse, is its sole authentic memorial. Poole completed the glossary and a further vocabulary or gazetteer of the local proper names in the last five years of his life.

He died 20 November 1827, and was buried in the graveyard of the Society of Friends at Forest, County Wexford. He married, 13 May 1813, Mary, daughter of Thomas and Deborah Sparrow of Holmstown, County Wexford, and had three sons and three daughters. A poem in memory of Poole, called ‘The Mountain of Forth,’ by Richard Davis Webb, who had known and admired him, was published in 1867, and it was owing to Webb's exertions that the glossary was published.
