= Forth (County Wexford barony) =

Barony in County Wexford, Ireland

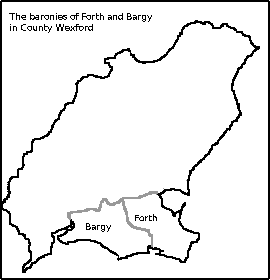
Barony of Forth in County Wexford, Ireland

Forth (Irish: Fotharta (Note: Forth)) (Yola: Forthe, or Vorth) is a barony in County Wexford in Ireland.

Forth is bordered by Wexford Harbour to the north, St George's Channel to the east, the Celtic Sea to the south, and the baronies of Bargy to the west and Shelmaliere East to the northwest. Settlements in the barony include (Note: Forth: towns) Wexford, Rosslare, Kilrane, Broadway, (Note: Forth: population centres) Ballycogly, Killinick, and Tagoat. Other features include Lady's Island Lake and Carnsore Point.

The Fotharta from whom the barony was named were a sept allied to the Uí Bairrche who ruled the Wexford region until the 8th century, when the Uí Ceinnselaig pushed them back to the southernmost part: the Fotharta to Forth and the Uí Bairrche to neighbouring Bargy. Another group of Fotharta settled in the Carlow barony of Forth. Patrick Weston Joyce quotes from Lebor na Cert that the Fotharta were descendants of Eochaidh Finn Fothart, son of Fedlimid Rechtmar, a second-century High King of Ireland. The Norman conquest of Ireland of the 1170s established a large English-speaking colony in Forth and Bargy, which survived throughout the late medieval Gaelic Resurgence. The distinctive Forth and Bargy dialect of Middle English survived until the 19th century.
