= Shelmalier =

Area of County Wexford, Ireland

Shelmalier or Shelmaliere (Irish: Síol Maoluír, from Old Irish Síl Máel Uidir, "Offspring of Maeleer") is a region in County Wexford, Ireland. It comprises two historical baronies, East Shelmaliere and West Shelmaliere.

The farmers of Shelmalier were accustomed to shooting wild fowl.

The area is mentioned in Patrick Joseph McCall's ballads Kelly the Boy from Killanne and Boolavogue.
