= Tacumshin Lake =

Lake and conservation area in County Wexford, Ireland

- Loch Sáile
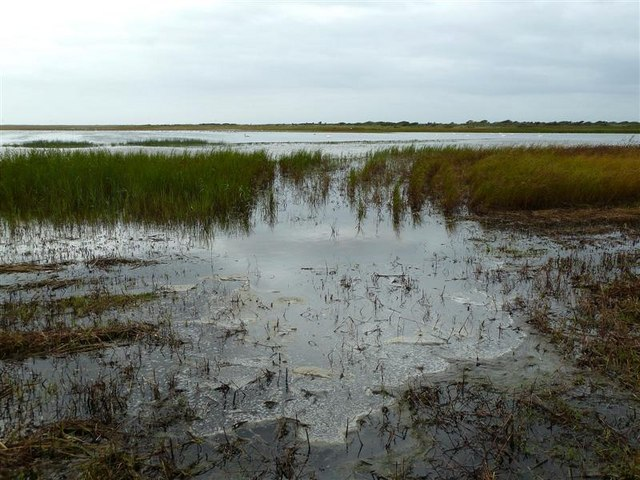
- Tacumshin Lake, looking south towards the sea

- Location within Ireland
- Location: County Wexford
- Coordinates: 52°11′43″N 6°27′11″W
- Basin countries: Ireland

Tacumshin Lake (Irish: Loch Sáile) is a lake in Tacumshane, in the southeast of County Wexford, Ireland. It is designated as a Special Protection Area (SPA) under the EU Bird Directive (EC/79/409) and a Special Area of Conservation by the National Parks and Wildlife Services.

Tacumshin Lake is a favourite with bird watchers. It attracts some rare American waders in Autumn, as well as internationally important concentrations of Bewick's swans, Brent geese, wigeon, oystercatchers, golden plover and lapwing.

== See also ==
- List of loughs in Ireland
