= Hiberno-English =

Dialect of English spoken in Ireland

- Irish English; Anglo-Irish
- English
- Native to: Ireland
- Region: Native: Republic of Ireland and Northern Ireland; Diaspora: United States, Great Britain, Australia, Canada, New Zealand
- Ethnicity: Irish people
- Native speakers: 5+ million in the Republic of Ireland 6.8 million speakers in Ireland overall. (2012 European Commission); 275,000 L2 speakers of English in Ireland (European Commission 2012)
- Language family: Indo-European: Germanic; West Germanic; North Sea Germanic; Anglo-Frisian; Anglic; English; Hiberno-English
- Early forms: Old English: Middle English; Early Modern English
- Dialects: Ulster English; Dublin English; South-West Irish English
- Writing system: Latin (English alphabet); Unified English Braille

Official status
- Regulated by: –

Language codes
- ISO 639-3: –
- Glottolog: iris1255
- IETF: en-IE

Speech example
An example of a man with a non-local Dublin accent (Dara Ó Briain)

Speech example
An example of a woman from Connacht with a supraregional Irish accent (Mary Robinson)

Speech example
An example of a man with a non-local (advanced) Dublin accent (Donal MacIntyre)

Hiberno-English (Note: Hiberno is pronounced /haɪˈbɜːr.noʊ, hɪ-/ hy-BUR-noh, hih-, from Latin: Hibernia "Ireland") or Irish English (IrE; Irish: Bearla na hÉireann), also formerly sometimes called Anglo-Irish, is the set of dialects of the English language native to the island of Ireland. In both the Republic of Ireland and Northern Ireland, English is the first language in everyday use and, alongside the Irish language, one of two official languages (with Ulster Scots, in Northern Ireland, being another local language or dialect).

The writing standards of Irish English, such as its spelling, align with British English. However, the diverse accents and some of the grammatical structures and vocabulary of Irish English are unique, including certain notably conservative phonological features and vocabulary: those that are no longer common in the dialects of England or North America. It shows significant influences from the Irish language and also, in the north, the Scots language.

Phonologists today often divide Irish English into four or five overarching dialects or accents: Ulster or Northern Irish accents, Western and Southern Irish accents (like Cork accents), various Dublin accents, and a non-regional standard accent (outside of Ulster) whose features have been developing since the late 1970s.

== History ==
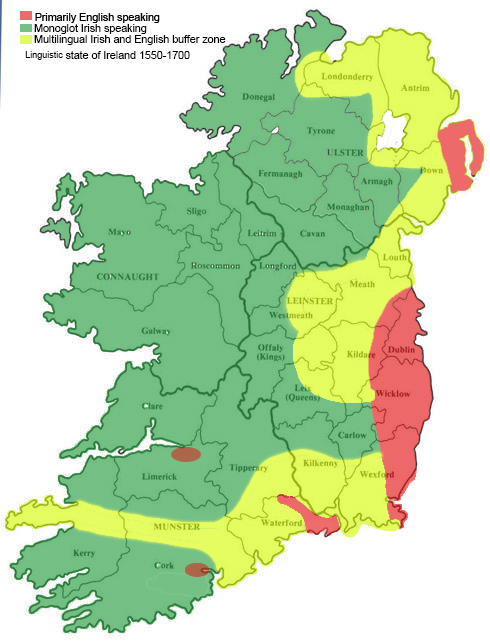
A rough estimate linguistic Map of Ireland 1550–1700. Highlighted in colour.

Middle English, as well as a small elite that spoke Anglo-Norman, was brought to Ireland as a result of the Anglo-Norman invasion of Ireland in the late 12th century. The remnants of these survived as the Yola language and Fingallian dialect, which are not mutually comprehensible with Modern English. A second wave of the English language was brought to Ireland in the 16th-century Elizabethan Early Modern period, making that variety of English spoken in Ireland the oldest outside of Great Britain. It remains more conservative today than many other dialects of English in terms of phonology and vocabulary.

Initially, during the Anglo-Norman period in Ireland, English was mainly spoken in an area known as the Pale around Dublin, with largely the Irish language spoken throughout the rest of the country. Some small pockets of speakers remained, who predominantly continued to use the English of that time. Because of their sheer isolation, these dialects developed into later, now-extinct, English-related varieties, known as Yola in Wexford and Fingallian in Fingal, Dublin. These were no longer mutually intelligible with other English varieties. By the Tudor period, Irish culture and language had regained most of the territory lost to the invaders: even in the Pale, "all the common folk… for the most part are of Irish birth, Irish habit, and of Irish language".

The Tudor conquest and colonisation of Ireland in the 16th century led to a second wave of immigration by English speakers, along with the forced suppression and decline in the status and use of the Irish language. By the mid-19th century, English had become the majority language spoken in the country. (Note: According to the 1841 census, Ireland had 8,175,124 inhabitants, of whom four million spoke Irish.) It has retained this status to the present day, with even those whose first language is Irish being fluent in English as well. Today, there is little more than one per cent of the population who speaks the Irish language natively, though it is required to be taught in all state-funded schools. Of the 40% of the population who self-identified as speaking some Irish in 2016, 4% speak Irish daily outside the education system.

A German traveller, Ludolf von Münchhausen, visited the Pale in Dublin in 1591. He says of the pale in regards to the language spoken there: "Little Irish is spoken; there are even some people here who cannot speak Irish at all". He may be mistaken, but if this account is true, the language of Dublin in the 1590s was English, not Irish. And yet again, Albert Jouvin travelled to Ireland in 1668; he says of the pale and the east coast, "In the inland parts of Ireland, they speak a particular language, but in the greatest part of the towns and villages on the sea coast, only English is spoken". 'A Tour of Ireland in 1775', by Richard Twiss says of the language spoken in Dublin "as at present almost all the peasants speak the English language, they converse with as much propriety as any persons of their class in England."

In On Early English Pronunciation, Part V, an early dialect study on English, Alexander John Ellis included some samples of Hiberno-English dialect from the Forth and Bargy baronies in County Wexford. Writing in the late 19th century, Ellis seems to have been unaware that English had been spoken in parts of Ireland, especially in Ulster, for centuries.

== Ulster English ==
Ulster English, or Northern Irish English, here refers collectively to the varieties of the Ulster province, including Northern Ireland and neighbouring counties outside of Northern Ireland, which has been influenced by Ulster Irish as well as the Scots language, brought over by Scottish settlers during the Plantation of Ulster. Its main subdivisions are Mid-Ulster English, South Ulster English and Ulster Scots, the latter of which is arguably a separate language. Ulster varieties distinctly pronounce:

- An ordinarily grammatically structured (i.e. non-topicalised) declarative sentence, often, with a rising intonation at the end of the sentence (the type of intonation pattern that other English speakers usually associate with questions).
- KIT as lowered, in the general vicinity of [ë~ɘ~ɪ̈].
- STRUT as fronted and slightly rounded, more closely approaching [ɞ].
- GOOSE and FOOT as merged in the general vicinity of [ʉ].
- MOUTH with a backed on-glide and fronted off-glide, putting it in the vicinity of [ɐʏ~ɜʉ].
- PRICE as [ɛɪ~ɜɪ], particularly before voiceless consonants.
- FACE as [eː], though nowadays commonly [eːə] or even [ɪːə] when in a closed syllable.
- GOAT, almost always, as a slightly raised monophthong [o̝(ː)].
- A lack of Happy-tensing; with the final vowel of happy, holy, money, etc. as [e].
- Syllable-final /l/ occasionally as "dark [ɫ]", though especially before a consonant.

== Western and Southern Irish English ==
Western and Southern Irish English is a collection of broad varieties of Ireland's West Region and Southern Region. Accents of both regions are known for:

- The backing and slight lowering of MOUTH towards [ɐʊ~ʌʊ].
- The more open starting point for NORTH and THOUGHT of [ɑːɹ~äːɹ] and [ɑː~äː], respectively.
- The preservation of GOAT as monophthongal [oː].
- /θ/ and /ð/, respectively, as [t] and [d].
- In the West, /s/ and /z/ may respectively be pronounced by very conservative speakers as /ʃ/ and /ʒ/ before a consonant, so fist sounds like fished, castle like Cashel, and arrest like "arresht".

The subset, South-West Irish English (often known, by specific county, as Cork English, Kerry English, or Limerick English), features two additional defining characteristics of its own. One is the pin–pen merger: the raising of dress to [ɪ] when before /n/ or /m/ (as in again or pen). The other is the intonation pattern of a slightly higher pitch followed by a significant drop in pitch on stressed long-vowel syllables (across multiple syllables or even within a single one), which is popularly heard in rapid conversation, by speakers of other English dialects, as a noticeable kind of undulating "sing-song" pattern.

== Dublin English ==
Dublin English is highly internally diverse and refers collectively to the Irish English varieties immediately surrounding and within the metropolitan area of Dublin. Modern-day Dublin English largely lies on a phonological continuum, ranging from a more traditional, lower-prestige, local urban accent on the one end, to a more recently developing, higher-prestige, non-local, regional and even supra-regional accent on the other end. Most of the latter characteristics of Dublin English first emerged in the late 1980s and early 1990s.

The accent that most strongly uses the traditional working-class features has been labelled by the linguist Raymond Hickey as "local Dublin English". Most speakers from Dublin and its suburbs have accent features falling variously along the entire middle, as well as the newer end of the spectrum, which together form what is called "non-local Dublin English". It is spoken by middle- and upper-class natives of Dublin and the greater eastern Irish region surrounding the city.

In the most general terms, all varieties of Dublin English have the following identifying sounds that are often distinct from the rest of Ireland, pronouncing:

- MOUTH as fronted or raised [æʊ~ɛʊ~eʊ].
- PRICE as retracted or centralised [əɪ~ɑɪ].
- GOAT as a diphthong in the range (local to non-local) of [ʌʊ~oʊ~əʊ].

=== Local Dublin English ===
Local Dublin English (or popular Dublin English) is a traditional, broad, working-class variety spoken in the Republic of Ireland's capital city of Dublin. It is the only Irish English variety that in earlier history was non-rhotic; but today it is weakly rhotic. Known for diphthongisation of the GOAT and FACE vowels, the local Dublin accent is also known for a phenomenon called "vowel breaking", in which MOUTH, PRICE, GOOSE and FLEECE in closed syllables are "broken" into two syllables, approximating [ɛwə], [əjə], [uwə], and [ijə], respectively.

=== Advanced Dublin English ===
Evolving as a fashionable outgrowth of the mainstream non-local Dublin English, advanced Dublin English, also new Dublin English or formerly fashionable Dublin English, is a youthful variety that originally began in the early 1990s among the "avant-garde" and now those aspiring to a non-local "urban sophistication". Advanced Dublin English itself, first associated with affluent and middle-class inhabitants of southside Dublin, is probably now spoken by a majority of Dubliners born since the 1980s.

Advanced Dublin English can have a fur–fair merger, horse–hoarse, and witch–which mergers, while resisting the traditionally Irish English cot–caught merger. This accent has since spread south to parts of east County Wicklow, west to parts of north County Kildare, and parts of south County Meath. The accent can be heard among the middle to upper classes in most major cities in the Republic today.

== Standard Irish English ==
Supraregional Southern Irish English, sometimes, simply Supraregional Irish English or Standard Irish English, refers to a variety spoken particularly by educated and middle- or higher-class Irish people, crossing regional boundaries throughout all of the Republic of Ireland, except the north. A mainstream middle-class variety of Dublin English of the early- to mid-twentieth century is the direct influence and catalyst for this variety, coming about by the suppression of certain markedly Irish features, and retention of other Irish features, as well as the adoption of certain standard British (i.e., non-Irish) features.

The result is a configuration of features that is still unique. In other words, this accent is not simply a wholesale shift towards British English. Most speakers born in the 1980s or later are showing fewer features of this late-twentieth-century mainstream supraregional form and more characteristics aligning with a rapidly-spreading advanced Dublin accent. See more above, under "Non-local Dublin English".

Ireland's supraregional dialect pronounces:

- TRAP as quite open a.
- PRICE along a possible spectrum [aɪ~äɪ~ɑɪ], with innovative [ɑɪ] particularly more common before voiced consonants, notably including /r/.
- MOUTH as starting fronter and often more raised than other dialects: [aʊ~æʊ~ɛʊ].
- START may be [äːɹ], with a backer vowel than in other Irish accents, though still relatively fronted.
- THOUGHT as [ɒː].
- NORTH as [ɒːɹ], almost always separate from FORCE [oːɹ], keeping words like war and wore, or horse and hoarse, pronounced distinctly.
- CHOICE as [ɒɪ].
- GOAT as a diphthong, approaching oʊ, as in the mainstream United States, or əʊ, as in mainstream England.
- STRUT as higher, fronter, and often rounder [ə~ʊ].

== Phonology ==
The following charts list the vowels typical of each Irish English dialect as well as the several distinctive consonants of Irish English, according to the linguist Raymond Hickey. Phonological characteristics of overall Irish English are given as well as categorisations into five major divisions of Hiberno-English: Ulster; West and South-West Ireland; local Dublin; advanced Dublin; and supraregional (southern) Ireland. Features of mainstream non-local Dublin English fall on a range between what Hickey calls "local Dublin" and "advanced Dublin".

=== Vowels ===
The following vowel realisations are defining characteristics of Irish English:

- STRUT is typically centralised in the mouth and often rounder than other standard English varieties, such as Received Pronunciation in England or General American in the United States.
- There is a partial trap-bath split in most Irish English varieties (cf. Variation in Australian English).
- There is inconsistency regarding the lot–cloth split and the cot–caught merger; certain Irish English dialects have these phenomena while others do not. The cot-caught merger by definition rules out the presence of the lot-cloth split.
- An epenthetic schwa is often inserted between sonorants, e.g. film [ˈfɪləm] and form [ˈfɒɹəm], due to the influence of the Irish language.
- The words any and many are often exceptionally pronounced with /æ/, i.e. rhyme with Annie and Danny.
- The MOUTH diphthong, as in ow or doubt, may start more forward in the mouth in the east (namely, Dublin) and supraregionally; though it may be further backward throughout the entire rest of the country. In Ulster, the second element is particularly forward, as in Scotland.
- The CHOICE diphthong, as in boy or choice, generally starts off lower outside of Ulster.
- The FACE vowel, as in rain or bay, is most commonly realised as monophthongal [eː]. The words gave and came often have /ɛ/ instead, i.e. rhyme with "Kev" and "them".

Diaphoneme	Ulster	West & South-West Ireland	Local Dublin	Advanced Dublin	Supraregional Ireland	Example words
flat /æ/	[äː~a]	[æ]		[a]	[æ~a]	add, land, trap
/ɑː/ and broad /æ/	[äː~ɑː]	[æː~aː]		[aː] (Note: In southside Dublin's once-briefly fashionable "Dublin 4" (or "Dortspeak") accent, the "/ɑː/ and broad /æ/" set becomes rounded as [ɒː].)		bath, calm, dance
conservative /ɒ/	[ɒ]	[ä]		[ɑ~ɒ~ɔ]	[ɑ]	lot, top, wasp
divergent /ɒ/	[ɔː~ɒː]	[aː~ä]		[ɔː]	[ɒ]	loss, off
/ɔː/	[ɔː~ɒː]	[aː~ä]		[ɒː~ɔː~oː]	[ɒː]	all, bought, saw
/ɛ/	[ɛ] (Note: In South-West Ireland, /ɛ/ before /n/ or /m/ is raised to [ɪ]. (de Gruyter 2004, p. 84))					dress, met, bread
/ə/	[ə]					about, syrup, arena
/ɪ/ (Note: Ulster-English lacks Happy-tensing, meaning that the final vowel diaphoneme /i/ is pronounced like the diaphoneme /ɪ/ as in kit, or /eɪ/ (realised as [e]} as in face, instead of /iː/ as in fleece. (de Gruyter 2004, p. 91))	[ë~ɘ~ɪ̈]	[ɪ]				hit, skim, tip
/iː/	[i(ː)] (Note: Due to the phenomenon of "vowel breaking" in local Dublin accents, /iː/ and /uː/ may be realised as [ijə] and [ʊuwə] in closed syllables.)	[i(ː)]				beam, chic, fleet
/i/	[e~ɪ]	[i(ː)]				happy, coffee, movie
/ʌ/	[ʌ̈~ʊ]		[ʊ]	[ɤ~ʊ]	[ʌ̈~ʊ]	bus, flood
/ʊ/	[ʉ(ː)]	[ʊ]				book, put, should
/uː/	[ʉ(ː)]	[ʊu~uː]			[ʊu~ʉu]	food, glue, threw
/aɪ/	[ɛɪ~ɜɪ]	[æɪ~ɐɪ]	[əɪ~ɐɪ] (Note: Due to the phenomenon of "vowel breaking" local Dublin accents, /aɪ/ and /aʊ/ may be realised as [əjə] and [ɛwə] in closed syllables.)	[ɑɪ~ɐɪ]	[aɪ~ɑɪ]	bright, ride, try
/aʊ/	[ɐʏ~ɜʉ]	[ɐʊ~ʌʊ]	[ɛʊ]		[aʊ~ɛʊ]	now, ouch, scout
/eɪ/	[eː(ə)]	[eː]	[eː~eɪ~ɛɪ]			lame, rein, stain
/ɔɪ/	[ɔɪ]	[əɪ~ɑɪ]	[aɪ~äɪ]	[ɒɪ~oɪ]	[ɒɪ]	boy, choice, moist
/oʊ/	[oː]		[ʌo~ʌɔ]	[əʊ]	[oʊ~əʊ]	goat, oh, show

Other notes:

- In some highly conservative Irish English varieties, the meet-meat merger has not occurred; words spelled with ⟨ea⟩ and pronounced with [iː] in RP are pronounced with [eː], for example meat, beat, and leaf.
- In words like took where the spelling ⟨oo⟩ usually represents /ʊ/, conservative speakers may use /uː/. This is most common in local Dublin and the speech of north-east Leinster.

=== Consonants ===
The consonants of Hiberno-English mostly align with the typical English consonant sounds. but a few Irish English consonants have distinctive, varying qualities. The following consonant features are defining characteristics of Hiberno-English:

- Th-stopping: /ð/ and /θ/ are pronounced as stops outside Ulster, [d] and [t], making then and den as well as thin and tin homophones. Some accents realise them as dental stops [t̪, d̪] and do not merge them with alveolar /t, d/, making tin ([tʰɪn]) and thin [t̪ʰɪn] a minimal pair. In Ulster, they are [ð] and [θ], as in RP.
- Rhoticity: The pronunciation of historical /r/ is universal in Irish English, as in General American (but not Received Pronunciation), i.e. /r/ is always pronounced, even word finally and before consonants (e.g. here, cart, or surf).
- Yod-dropping after /n/, /l/ and /s/, e.g. new /nuː/ (advanced), lute /ˈluːt/, and sue /suː/, and Yod-coalescence after /d/ and /t/, e.g. duty /ˈdʒuːti/ and tune /tʃuːn/.
- Lack of H-dropping and occurrence of /h/ where it is permitted in Irish but excluded in other dialects of English, such as word-medially before an unstressed vowel (e.g. Haughey /ˈhɔːhi/) and word-finally (e.g. McGrath /məˈɡɹæh/). The pronunciation haitch /heɪtʃ/ for ⟨h⟩ is standard in the Republic of Ireland and among Catholics in Northern Ireland, while Protestants in Northern Ireland use aitch /eɪtʃ/.
- Syllable-final and intervocalic /t/ (and sometimes /d/) is pronounced uniquely in most Hiberno-English (but not Ulster) as a "slit fricative". This is similar to /s/ but without the hissy articulation.
- The phoneme /l/ is almost always of a "light" or "clear" quality (i.e. not velarised), unlike Received Pronunciation or General American, which use both a clear and a dark "L" sound.

Diaphoneme	Ulster (Note: In traditional, conservative Ulster English, /k/ and /ɡ/ are palatalised before an open front vowel. (de Gruyter 2004, p. 88))	West & South-West Ireland	Local Dublin (Note: Local Dublin features consonant cluster reduction, so that plosives occurring after fricatives or sonorants may be left unpronounced, resulting, for example, in "poun(d)" and "las(t)". (de Gruyter 2004, p. 84))	Advanced Dublin	Supraregional Ireland	Example words
/ð/	[ð]	[d]		[d̪]		this, writhe, wither
syllable-final /l/	[l] or [ɫ]	[l]	[l] or [ɫ]			ball, soldier, milk
/r/ (Note: In extremely traditional and conservative accents (e.g. Mícheál Ó Muircheartaigh and Jackie Healy-Rae), prevocalic /r/ can also be an alveolar flap, [ɾ]. /r/ may be guttural (uvular, [ʁ]) in north-east Leinster. (Hickey 2007a, p. 320))	[ɻ]	[ɹˠ]	[ɹˠ] or [ɾ]	[ɻ]	[ɹˠ] or [ɻ]	rot, eerie, scary
syllable-final /r/	[ɻ]	[ɹˠ]	[ɹˠ] or [∅]	[ɻ]	[ɹˠ] or [ɻ]	car, shirt, here
intervocalic /t/	[ɾ], [ʔ], or [∅]	[θ̠] or [ɾ] (Note: ⟨θ̠⟩ is used here to represent the voiceless alveolar non-sibilant fricative, sometimes known as a "slit fricative" (Hickey 1984, p. 234), which is apico-alveolar. (de Gruyter 2004, p. 93))	[ʔ(h)]	[ɾθ̠]	[θ̠], [ʔ], or [ɾ]	battle, Italy, water
word-final /t/	[t] or [ʔ]	[θ̠]	[ʔ], [h], or [∅]	[θ̠] or [ʔ]		cat, get, right
/θ/	[θ]	[t]		[t̪]		lethal, thick, wrath
/hw/ (Note: Overall, /hw/ and /w/ are being increasingly merged in supraregional Irish English, for example, making wine and whine homophones, as in most varieties of English around the world. (de Gruyter 2004, p. 93))	[w]	[ʍ]		[w]	[ʍ] or [w]	awhile, whale, when

=== Vowel + ⟨r⟩ combinations ===
The following vowels + ⟨r⟩ create combinations that are defining characteristics of Hiberno-English:

- Lack of the horse–hoarse merger: the distinction is traditionally maintained between /ɔː/ and /oʊ/ before the consonant /r/, so that e.g. horse and hoarse are not homophones in most Irish accents, though this is changing among younger speakers.
- START vowel realised more forward in the mouth in comparison to most varieties of English.

Diaphoneme	Ulster	West & South-West Ireland	Local Dublin	Advanced Dublin	Supraregional Ireland	Example words
/ɑːr/	[ɑɻ~ɑɹ]	[æːɹ~aɹ]		[äːɹ~ɑɹ] (Note: In southside Dublin's "Dublin 4" (or "Dortspeak") accent, /ɑːr/ is realised as [ɒːɹ].)		car, guard, park
/ɪər/	[iːɹ~iɚ]					fear, peer, tier
/ɛər/	[(ɛ)ɚː]	[ɛːɹ~eɹ] (Note: In non-local Dublin's more recently emerging (or "advanced Dublin") accent, /ɛər/ and /ɜːr/ may both be realised more rounded as [øːɻ].)				bare, bear, there
/ɜːr/ (Note: The NURSE mergers have not occurred in local Dublin, West/South-West, and other very conservative and traditional Irish English dialects, including in Ulster, all of which retain a two-way distinction between /ɛr/ as in earn versus /ʊr/ as in urn. Contrarily, most English dialects worldwide have merged /ɛ/ and /ʊ/ before the consonant /r/. For instance, in the case of non-local Dublin, supraregional, and younger Irish accents, the merged sequence is phonetically [ɚː]. But for those accents that retain the more conservative distinction, the distribution of /ɛr/ and /ʊr/ is as follows: /ʊr/ occurs when spelled ⟨ur⟩ and ⟨or⟩ (e.g. urn and word), ⟨ir⟩ after alveolar stops (e.g. dirt), and after labial consonants (e.g. fern); /ɛr/ is occurs in all other situations (Hickey 2007a, p. 330). There are apparent exceptions to these rules; John C. Wells describes prefer and per as /ɛr/, despite the vowel in question following a labial in both cases (Wells 1982, p. 421). The distribution of /ɛr/ versus /ʊr/ is listed below in some example words: /ɛr/: certain [ˈsɛːɹtn̩]; chirp [ˈtʃʰɛːɹp]; circle [ˈsɛːɹkəl]; earn [ɛːɹn]; earth [ɛːɹt]; girl [ɡɛːɹl]; germ [dʒɛːɹm]; heard or herd [hɛːɹd]; Hertz [hɛːɹts]; irk [ɛːɹk]; tern [tʰɛːɹn]; /ʊr/: bird [bʊːɹd]; dirt [dʊːɹt]; first [fʊːɹst]; hurts [hʊːɹts]; murder [ˈmʊːɹdɚ]; nurse [ˈnʊːɹs]; turn [tʰʊːɹn]; third or turd [tʰʊːɹd]; urn [ʊːɹn]; work [wʊːɹk]; world [wʊːɹld])	[ɚː]	[ɛːɹ]		[ɚː]		irk, girl, earn
/ɜːr/	[ɚː]	[ʊːɹ]		[ɚː]		work, first, urn
/ər/	[ɚ] (Note: In a rare few local Dublin varieties that are non-rhotic, /ər/ is either lowered to [ɐ] or backed and raised to [ɤ].)					doctor, martyr, pervade
/ɔːr/ (Note: The distinction between /ɔːr/ and /oʊr/ is widely preserved in Ireland, so that, for example, horse and hoarse are not merged in most Irish English dialects; but they are usually merged in Belfast and advanced Dublin.)	[ɒːɚ~ɔːɹ]	[äːɹ~ɑːɹ]		[ɒːɹ~oːɹ]		for, horse, war
/ɔːr/	[oːɚ~oːɹ]	[ɔːɹ]	[ɒːɹ]	[oːɹ]		four, hoarse, wore
/ʊər/	[uːɹ~uɚ] (Note: In local Dublin /(j)ʊər/ may be realised as [(j)uʷə(ɹ)]. For some speakers /(j)ʊər/ may merge with /ɔːr/.)					moor, poor, tour
/jʊər/	[juːɹ~juɚ~jɚː]					cure, Europe, pure

== Vocabulary ==
=== Loan words from Irish ===
A number of Irish language loan words are used in Hiberno-English, particularly in an official state capacity. For example, the head of government is the Taoiseach, the deputy head is the Tánaiste, the parliament is the Oireachtas and its lower house is Dáil Éireann. Less formally, people also use loan words in day-to-day speech, although this has been on the wane in recent decades and among the young.

Example loan words from Irish
Word	IPA (English)	IPA (Irish)	Part of speech	Meaning
Abú	/əˈbuː/	/əˈbˠuː/	Interjection	Hooray! Used in sporting occasions, especially for Gaelic games – Áth Cliath abú! 'hooray for Dublin!'
Amadán	/ˈɒmədɔːn/	/ˈamˠəd̪ˠaːnˠ/	Noun	Fool
Fáilte	/ˈfɑːltʃə/	/ˈfˠaːlʲtʲə/	Noun	Welcome – often in the phrase céad míle fáilte 'a hundred thousand welcomes'
Flaithiúlach	/flæˈhuːləx/	/ˈfˠlˠahuːlˠəx/	Adjective	Generous; unwisely profligate
Garda (singular); Gardaí (plural)	/ˈɡɑːrdə/ /ˈɡɑːrdi/	/ˈɡaːɾˠd̪ˠə/ /ˈɡaːɾˠd̪ˠiː/	Noun	Irish police officer
(An) Garda Síochána	/(ən) ˈɡɑːrdə ˈʃiːəxɔːnə/	/(ə) ˈɡaːɾˠd̪ˠə ˈʃiːxaːnˠə/	Noun	Irish police force
Garsún; Garsúr	/ˈɡɑːrsuːn/ /ˈɡɑːrsuːr/	/ˈɡaɾˠsˠuːnˠ/ /ˈɡaɾˠsˠuːrˠ/	Noun	Boy
Gaeltacht	/ˈɡeɪltəxt/	/ˈɡeːl̪ˠt̪ˠəxt̪ˠ/	Noun	Officially designated region where Irish is the primary spoken language
Grá	/ɡrɑː/	/ɡɾˠaː/	Noun	Love, affection, not always romantic – 'he has a great grá for the dog'
Lúdramán	/ˈluːdrəmɑːn/	/ˈlˠuːd̪ˠɾˠəmˠaːnˠ/	Noun	Fool
Plámás	/ˈplɑːmɑːs/	/ˈpˠlˠaːmˠaːsˠ/	Noun	Smooth talk, flattery
Sláinte	/ˈslɑːntʃə/	/ˈsˠl̪ˠaːn̠ʲtʲə/	Interjection	"[To your] health!/Cheers!"

=== Derived words from Irish ===
Another group of Hiberno-English words are those derived from the Irish language. Some are words in English that have entered into general use, while others are unique to Ireland. These words and phrases are often Anglicised versions of words in Irish or direct translations into English. In the latter case, they often give meaning to a word or phrase that is generally not found in wider English use.

Example words derived from Irish
Word or Phrase	Part of Speech	Original Irish	Meaning
Arra/ och / musha / yerra	Interjection	Ara / Ach / Muise / (conjunction of a Dhia, ara)	"Yerra, sure if it rains, it rains."
Bockety	Adjective	Bacach (lame)	Unsteady, wobbly, broken
Boreen	Noun	Bóithrín	Small rural road or track
Ceili/Ceilidh /ˈkeɪli/	Noun	Céilí	Music and dancing session, especially of traditional music
Colleen	Noun	Cailín	Girl, young woman
Fooster	Verb	Fústar	to busy oneself in a restless way, fidget
Gansey	Noun	Geansaí	Jumper (Sweater)
Give out	Verb	Tabhair amach	Tell off, reprimand
Gob	Noun	Gob	Animal's mouth/beak (béal = human mouth)
Gombeen	Noun	Gaimbín	Money lender, profiteer. Usually in the phrase 'Gombeen man'
Guards	Noun	Garda Síochána	Police
Jackeen /dʒæˈkiːn/	Noun	Nickname for John (i.e. Jack) combined with Irish diminutive suffix -ín	A mildly pejorative term for someone from Dublin. Also 'a self-assertive worthless fellow'. Derived from a person who followed the Union Jack during British rule after 1801, a Dublin man who supported the crown. (See also Shoneen.)
Shoneen	Noun	Seoinín (diminutive of Seán 'John')	An Irishman who imitates English ways (See also Jackeen.)
Sleeveen	Noun	Slíbhín	An untrustworthy, cunning person
Soft day	Phrase	Lá bog (lit.)	Overcast day (light drizzle/mist)

=== Derived words from Old and Middle English ===
Another class of vocabulary found in Hiberno-English are words and phrases common in Old and Middle English, but which have since become obscure or obsolete in the modern English language generally. Hiberno-English has also developed particular meanings for words that are still in common use in English generally.

Example Hiberno-English words derived from Old and Middle English
Word	Part of speech	Meaning	Origin/notes
Amn't	Verb	"Am not" or used instead of "aren't"	
Childer	Noun	Child	Survives from Old English, genitive plural of 'child'
Cop-on	Noun, Verb	shrewdness, intelligence, being 'street-wise'	Middle English from French cap 'arrest'
Craic / Crack /kræk/	Noun	Fun, entertainment. Generally now with the Gaelic spelling in the phrase – 'have the craic' from earlier usage in Northern Ireland, Scotland and northern England with spelling 'crack' in the sense 'gossip, chat'	Old English cracian via Ulster-Scots into modern Hiberno-English, then given Gaelic spelling
Devil	Noun	Curse (e.g., "Devil take him") Negation (e.g., for none, "Devil a bit")	middle English
Eejit /ˈiːdʒɪt/	Noun	Irish (and Scots) version of 'idiot', meaning foolish person	English from Latin idiōta; has found some modern currency in England through the broadcasts of Terry Wogan
Hames	Noun	a mess, used in the phrase 'make a hames of'	Middle English from Dutch
Grinds	Noun	Private tuition	Old English grindan
Jaded	Adjective	physically tired, exhausted Not in the sense of bored, unenthusiastic, 'tired of' something	Middle English jade
Kip	Noun	Unpleasant, dirty or sordid place	18th-century English for brothel
Mitch	Verb	to play truant	Middle English
Sliced pan	Noun	(Sliced) loaf of bread	Possibly derived from the French pain 'bread' or the pan it was baked in.
Yoke	Noun	Thing, object, gadget	Old English geoc
Wagon/Waggon	Noun	an unpleasant or unlikable woman	Middle English
Whisht	Interjection	Be quiet (Also common in Northern England and Scotland)	Middle English

=== Other words ===
In addition to the three groups above, there are also additional words and phrases whose origin is disputed or unknown. While this group may not be unique to Ireland, their usage is not widespread, and could be seen as characteristic of Irish English.

Example Hiberno-English words of disputed or unknown origin
Word	Part of speech	Meaning	Notes
Acting the maggot	Phrase	To behave in an obstreperous or obstinate manner	
Banjaxed	Verb	Broken, ruined, or rendered incapable of use. Equivalent in meaning to the German kaputt	
Bogger	Noun	Someone from the countryside or near a bog	
Bowsie	Noun	a rough or unruly person. Cf. Scots Bowsie	
Bleb	Noun, verb	blister; to bubble up, come out in blisters	
Bucklepper	Noun	An overactive, overconfident person from the verb, to bucklep (leap like a buck)	Used by Patrick Kavanagh and Seamus Heaney
Chiseler	Noun	Child	
Cod	Noun	Foolish person	Usually in phrases like 'acting the cod', 'making a cod of himself'. Can also be used as a verb, 'I was only codding him'
Culchie	Noun	Person from the countryside	
Delph	Noun	Dishware	From the name of the original source of supply, Delft in the Netherlands. See Delftware.
Feck	Verb, interjection	an attenuated alternative/minced oath	"Feck it!", "Feck off"
Gurrier	Noun	a tough or unruly young man	perhaps from French guerrier 'warrior', or else from 'gur cake' a pastry previously associated with street urchins. Cf. Scots Gurry
Jacks	Noun	Bathroom/toilet	Similar to "jakes" as used in 16th-century England. Still in everyday use, particularly in Dublin.
Messages	Noun	Groceries	
Minerals	Noun	Soft drinks	From mineral Waters
Mot	Noun	Girl or young woman, girlfriend	From Irish maith 'good', i.e. good-looking.
Press	Noun	Cupboard	Similarly, hotpress in Ireland means airing-cupboard. Press is an old word for cupboard in Scotland and Northern England.
Rake	Noun	many or a lot. Often in the phrase 'a rake of pints'. Cf. Scots rake	
Runners	Noun	Trainers/sneakers	Also 'teckies' or 'tackies', especially in and around Limerick.
Sallow	Adjective	Of a tan colour, associated with people from southern Europe or East Asia.	
Shops	Noun	Newsagents (or small supermarket)	E.g. "I'm going to the shops, do you want anything?"
Shore	Noun	Stormdrain or Gutter. Cf. Scots shore	
Wet the tea/The tea is wet	Phrase	Make the tea/the tea is made	

== Grammar and syntax ==
The syntax of the Irish language is quite different from that of English. Various aspects of Irish syntax have influenced Hiberno-English, though many of these idiosyncrasies are disappearing in suburban areas and among the younger population.

Another feature of Hiberno-English that sets it apart is the retention of words and phrases from Old and Middle English that are not retained otherwise in Modern English.

=== From Irish ===
==== Reduplication ====
Reduplication is an alleged trait of Hiberno-English strongly associated with Stage Irish and Hollywood films.

- the Irish ar bith corresponds to English 'at all', so the stronger ar chor ar bith gives rise to the form "at all at all".
  - "I've no time at all at all."
- ar eagla go ... (lit. 'on fear that ...') means 'in case ...'. The variant ar eagla na heagla, (lit. 'on fear of fear') implies the circumstances are more unlikely. The corresponding Hiberno-English phrases are 'to be sure' and the very rarely used "to be sure to be sure". In this context, these are not, as might be thought, disjuncts meaning "certainly"; they could better be translated 'in case' and 'just in case'. Nowadays normally spoken with conscious levity.
  - "I brought some cash in case I saw a bargain, and my credit card to be sure to be sure."

==== Yes and no ====
Irish has no words that directly translate as 'yes' or 'no', and instead repeats the verb used in the question, negated if necessary, to answer. Hiberno-English uses "yes" and "no" less frequently than other English dialects as speakers can repeat the verb, positively or negatively, instead of (or in redundant addition to) using "yes" or "no".

- "Are you coming home soon?" – "I am."
- "Is your mobile charged?" – "It isn't."

This is not limited only to the verb to be: it is also used with to have when used as an auxiliary; and, with other verbs, the verb to do is used. This is most commonly used for intensification, especially in Ulster English.

- "This is strong stuff, so it is."
- "We won the game, so we did."

==== Recent past construction ====
Irish indicates recency of an action by adding "after" to the present continuous (a verb ending in "-ing"), a construction known as the "hot news perfect" or "after perfect". The idiom for "I had done X when I did Y" is "I was after doing X when I did Y", modelled on the Irish usage of the compound prepositions i ndiaidh, tar éis, and in éis: bhí mé tar éis / i ndiaidh / in éis X a dhéanamh, nuair a rinne mé Y.

- "Why did you hit him?" – "He was after giving me cheek." (he had [just beforehand] been cheeky to me).

A similar construction is seen where exclamation is used in describing a recent event:

- "I'm after hitting him with the car!" Táim tar éis é a bhualadh leis an gcarr!
- "She's after losing five stone in five weeks!" Tá sí tar éis cúig chloch a chailleadh i gcúig seachtaine!

When describing less astonishing or significant events, a structure resembling the German perfect can be seen:

- "I have the car fixed." Tá an carr deisithe agam.
- "I have my breakfast eaten." Tá mo bhricfeasta ite agam.

This correlates with an analysis of "H1 Irish" proposed by Adger & Mitrovic, in a deliberate parallel to the status of German as a V2 language.

Recent past construction has been directly adopted into Newfoundland English, where it is common in both formal and casual register. In rural areas of the Avalon peninsula, where Newfoundland Irish was spoken until the early 20th century, it is the grammatical standard for describing whether or not an action has occurred.

==== Reflection for emphasis ====
The reflexive version of pronouns is often used for emphasis or to refer indirectly to a particular person, etc., according to context. Herself, for example, might refer to the speaker's boss or to the woman of the house. Use of herself or himself in this way can imply status or even some arrogance of the person in question. Note also the indirectness of this construction relative to, for example, She's coming now. This reflexive pronoun can also be used in a more neutral sense to describe a person's spouse or partner – "I was with himself last night" or "How's herself doing?"

- "'Tis herself that's coming now." Is í féin atá ag teacht anois.
- "Was it all of ye or just yourself?" An sibhse ar fad nó tusa féin a bhí i gceist?

==== Prepositional pronouns ====
There are some language forms that stem from the fact that there is no verb to have in Irish. Instead, possession is indicated in Irish by using the preposition "at", (in Irish, ag). To be more precise, Irish uses a prepositional pronoun that combines ag 'at' and mé 'me' to create agam. In English, the verb "to have" is used, along with a "with me" or "on me" that derives from Tá ... agam. This gives rise to the frequent

- "Do you have the book?" – "I have it with me."
- "Have you change for the bus on you?"
- "He will not shut up if he has drink taken."

Somebody who can speak a language "has" a language, in which Hiberno-English has borrowed the grammatical form used in Irish.

- "She does not have Irish." Níl Gaeilge aici. literally 'There is no Irish at her.'

When describing something, many Hiberno-English speakers use the term "in it" where "there" would usually be used. This is due to the Irish word ann fulfilling both meanings.

- "Is it yourself that is in it?" An tú féin atá ann?
- "Is there any milk in it?" An bhfuil bainne ann?

Another idiom is this thing or that thing described as "this man here" or "that man there", which also features in Newfoundland English in Canada.

- "This man here." An fear seo. (cf. the related anseo = here)
- "That man there." An fear sin. (cf. the related ansin = there)

Conditionals have a greater presence in Hiberno-English due to the tendency to replace the simple present tense with the conditional (would) and the simple past tense with the conditional perfect (would have).

- "John asked me would I buy a loaf of bread." (John asked me to buy a loaf of bread.)
- "How do you know him? We would have been in school together." (We were in school together.)

Bring and take: Irish use of these words differs from that of British English because it follows the Irish grammar for beir and tóg. English usage is determined by direction; a person determines Irish usage. So, in English, one takes "from here to there", and brings it "to here from there". In Irish, a person takes only when accepting a transfer of possession of the object from someone else – and a person brings at all other times, irrespective of direction (to or from).

- Do not forget to bring your umbrella with you when you leave.
- (To a child) Hold my hand: I do not want someone to take you.

==== To be ====
The Irish equivalent of the verb "to be" has two present tenses, one (the present tense proper or "aimsir láithreach") for cases which are generally true or are true at the time of speaking and the other (the habitual present or "aimsir ghnáthláithreach") for repeated actions. Thus, "you are [now, or generally]" is tá tú, but "you are [repeatedly]" is bíonn tú. Both forms are used with the verbal noun (equivalent to the English present participle) to create compound tenses. This is similar to the distinction between ser and estar in Spanish or the use of the "habitual be" in African-American Vernacular English.

The corresponding usage in English is frequently found in rural areas, especially County Mayo and County Sligo in the west of Ireland and County Wexford in the south-east, inner-city Dublin and Cork city along with border areas of the North and Republic. In this form, the verb "to be" in English is similar to its use in Irish, with a "does be/do be" (or "bees", although less frequently) construction to indicate the continuous, or habitual, present:

- "He does be working every day." Bíonn sé ag obair gach lá.
- "They do be talking on their mobiles a lot." Bíonn siad ag caint go minic ar a bhfóin póca.
- "He does be doing a lot of work at school." Bíonn sé ag déanamh go leor oibre ar scoil.
- "It's him I do be thinking of." Is air a bhíonn mé ag smaoineamh.

=== From Old and Middle English ===
In old-fashioned usage, "it is" can be freely abbreviated 'tis, even as a standalone sentence. This also allows the double contraction 'tisn't, for "it is not".

Irish has separate forms for the second person singular (tú) and the second person plural (sibh). Mirroring Irish, and almost every other Indo-European language, the plural you is also distinguished from the singular in Hiberno-English, normally by use of the otherwise archaic English word ye [jiː]; the word yous (sometimes written as youse) also occurs, but primarily only in Dublin and across Ulster. In addition, in some areas in Leinster, north Connacht and parts of Ulster, the hybrid word ye-s, pronounced "yiz", may be used. The pronunciation differs with that of the northwestern being [jiːz] and the Leinster pronunciation being [jɪz].

- "Did ye all go to see it?" Ar imigh sibh go léir chun é a fheicint?
- "None of youse have a clue!" Níl ciall/leid ar bith agaibh!
- "Are ye not finished yet?" Nach bhfuil sibh críochnaithe fós?
- "Yis are after destroying it!" Tá sibh tar éis é a scriosadh!

The word ye, yis or yous, otherwise archaic, is still used in place of "you" for the second-person plural, e.g. "Where are yous going?" Ye'r, Yisser or Yousser are the possessive forms.

The verb mitch is very common in Ireland, indicating being truant from school. This word appears in Shakespeare (though he wrote in Early Modern English rather than Middle English), but is seldom heard these days in British English, although pockets of usage persist in some areas (notably South Wales, Devon, and Cornwall). In parts of Connacht and Ulster, the mitch is often replaced by the verb scheme, while in Dublin it is often replaced by "on the hop/bounce".

Another usage familiar from Shakespeare is the inclusion of the second person pronoun after the imperative form of a verb, as in "Wife, go you to her ere you go to bed" (Romeo and Juliet, Act III, Scene IV). This is still common in Ulster: "Get youse your homework done or you're no goin' out!". In Munster, you will still hear children being told, "Up to bed, let ye" [lɛˈtʃi], although wider English uses similar constructions such as "Up to bed you go".

For influence from Scotland, see Ulster Scots and Ulster English.

=== Other grammatical influences ===
Now is often used at the end of sentences or phrases as a semantically empty word, completing an utterance without contributing any apparent meaning. Examples include "Bye now" (= "Goodbye"), "There you go now" (when giving someone something), "Ah now!" (expressing dismay), "Hold on now" (= "wait a minute"), "Now then" as a mild attention-getter, etc. This usage is universal among English dialects, but occurs more frequently in Hiberno-English. It is also used in the manner of the Italian 'prego' or German 'bitte', for example, a barman might say "Now, Sir." when delivering drinks.

So is often used for emphasis ("I can speak Irish, so I can"), or it may be tacked onto the end of a sentence to indicate agreement, where "then" would often be used in Standard English ("Bye so", "Let's go so", "That's fine so", "We'll do that so"). The word is also used to contradict a negative statement ("You're not pushing hard enough" – "I am so!"). (This contradiction of a negative is also seen in American English, though not as often as "I am too", or "Yes, I am".) The practice of indicating emphasis with so and including reduplicating the sentence's subject pronoun and auxiliary verb (is, are, have, has, can, etc.) such as in the initial example, is particularly prevalent in more northern dialects such as those of Sligo, Mayo and the counties of Ulster.

Sure/Surely is often used as a tag word, emphasising the obviousness of the statement, roughly translating as but/and/well/indeed. It can be used as "to be sure" (but the other stereotype of "Sure and …" is not actually used in Ireland). Or "Sure, I can just go on Wednesday", "I will not, to be sure." The word is also used at the end of sentences (primarily in Munster), for instance, "I was only here five minutes ago, sure!" and can express emphasis or indignation. In Ulster, the reply "Aye, surely" may be given to show strong agreement.

To is often omitted from sentences where it would exist in British English. For example, "I'm not allowed go out tonight", instead of "I'm not allowed to go out tonight".

Will is often used where British English would use "shall" or American English "should" (as in "Will I make us a cup of tea?"). The distinction between "shall" (for first-person simple future, and second- and third-person emphatic future) and "will" (second- and third-person simple future, first-person emphatic future), maintained by many in England, does not exist in Hiberno-English, with "will" generally used in all cases.

Once is sometimes used in a different way from how it is used in other dialects; in this usage, it indicates a combination of logical and causal conditionality: "I have no problem laughing at myself once the joke is funny." Other dialects of English would probably use "if" in this situation.

== See also ==
- English language in Europe
- Highland English
- Kiltartanese
- Languages of Ireland
- List of Irish words used in the English language
- List of English words of Irish origin
- Manx English
- Regional accents of English
- Welsh English

== Bibliography ==
- Adger, David (2003). Core Syntax: A Minimalist Approach. Oxford University Press. ISBN 0199243700.
- Hickey, Raymond (1984). "Coronal Segments in Irish English". Journal of Linguistics. 20 (2): 233–250. doi:10.1017/S0022226700013876. S2CID 145672742.
- Hickey, Raymond (2007a). Irish English: History and Present Day Forms. Cambridge University Press. ISBN 9781139465847. Archived from the original on 14 April 2021 – via Google Books. (Full text not available at this URL, on preview snippets.)
- Hickey, Raymond (2007b). "Dartspeak and Estuary English: Advanced metropolitan speech in Ireland and England". In Smit, Ute; Dollinger, Stefan; Hüttner, Julia; Lutzky, Ursula; Kaltenböck, Gunther (eds.). Tracing English through time: explorations in language variation (PDF). Vienna: Braumüller. pp. 179–190. Archived (PDF) from the original on 11 September 2016.
- Hickey, Raymond, ed. (2016). Sociolinguistics in Ireland. Basingstoke: Palgrave Macmillan. ISBN 9781137453471.
- Hickey, Raymond (2004). "Irish English: Phonology". In Kortmann, Bernd; Schneider, Edgar W. (eds.). A Handbook of Varieties of English. Walter de Gruyter. ISBN 3110175320.
- Wells, John C. (1982). Accents of English. Vol. 1: An Introduction (pp. i–xx, 1–278), Vol. 2: The British Isles (pp. i–xx, 279–466), Vol. 3: Beyond the British Isles (pp. i–xx, 467–674). Cambridge University Press. doi:10.1017/CBO9780511611759, doi:10.1017/CBO9780511611766. ISBN 0-52129719-2, 0-52128540-2, 0-52128541-0.
