= West Shelmaliere =

Barony in County Wexford, Ireland

West Shelmaliere Síol Maoluír Thiar (Irish)
- Barony
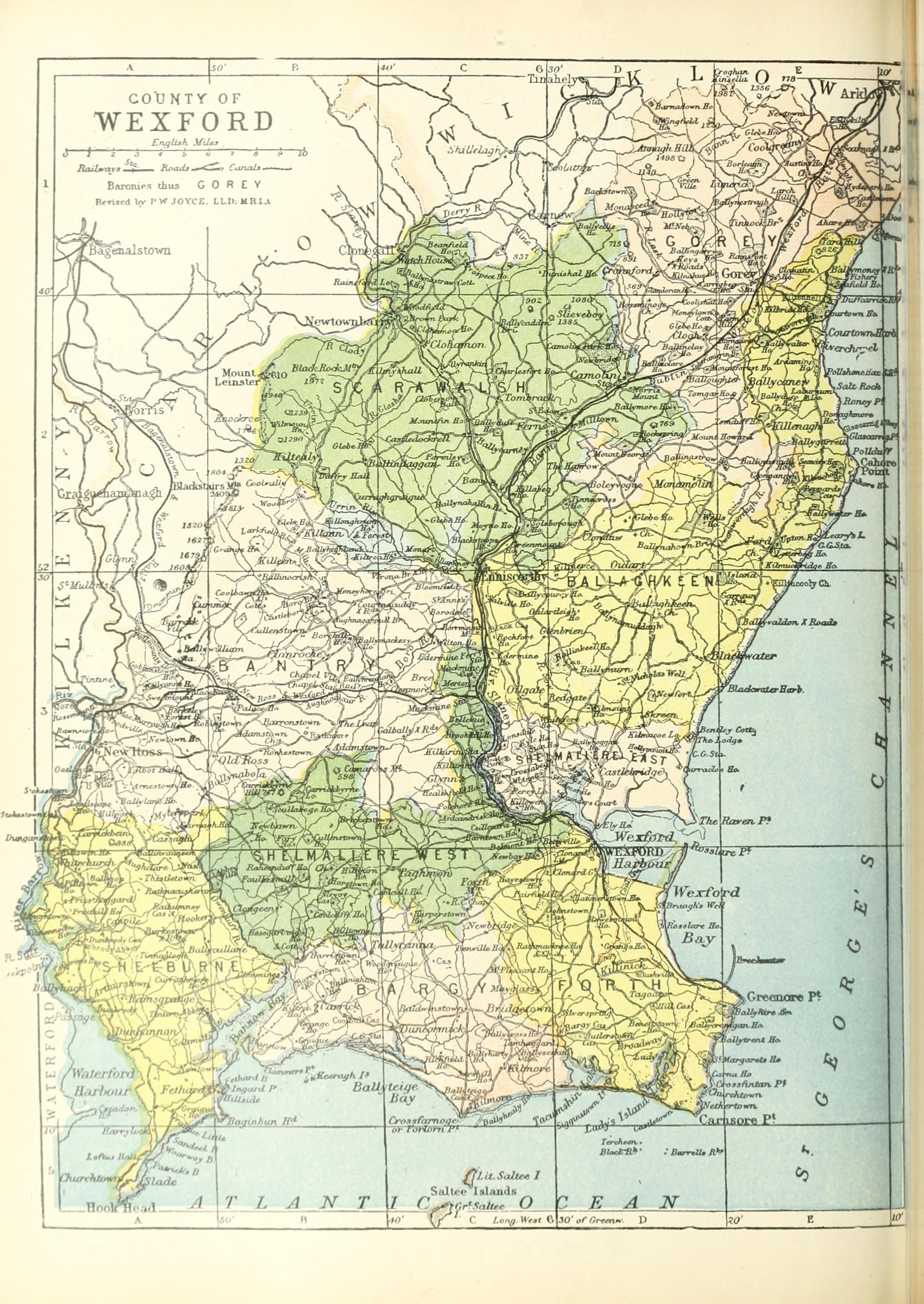
- Barony map of County Wexford, 1900; West Shelmaliere barony is in the south, coloured green.

- Location within Ireland
- Coordinates: 52°19′N 6°40′W
- Sovereign state: Ireland
- Province: Leinster
- County: Wexford

Area
  - Total: 203.6 km^{2} (78.6 sq mi)

West Shelmaliere, also called Shelmaliere West, (Irish: Síol Maoluír Thiar) is a historical barony in southwest County Wexford, Ireland.

Baronies were mainly cadastral rather than administrative units. They acquired modest local taxation and spending functions in the 19th century before being superseded by the Local Government (Ireland) Act 1898.

== History ==
The barony takes its name from the local tribe, the Shelmalier (Síol Maél Uidir, "seed of bald Uidir").

== Geography ==
West Shelmaliere is in the south of the county, west of the River Slaney and east of the Owenduff River.

== List of settlements ==
Settlements within the historical barony of West Shelmaliere include:

- Ballyhogue
- Barntown
- Killurin
- Newbawn
- Taghmon
- Wellingtonbridge
- Wexford
