= Yola dialect =

Historical Anglic dialect of southeast Ireland

Yola
- Forth and Bargy dialect
- Native to: Ireland
- Region: County Wexford
- Ethnicity: Old English/Hiberno-Normans
- Extinct: c. late 19th century
- Language family: Indo-European: Germanic; West Germanic; North Sea Germanic; Anglo-Frisian; Anglic; Old West Saxon; Yola
- Early forms: Proto-Indo-European: Proto-Germanic; Proto-West Germanic; Proto-English; West Saxon dialect; Middle English

Language codes
- ISO 639-3: yol (retired, covered by Middle English enm)
- Glottolog: yola1237
- Linguasphere: 52-ABA-bd
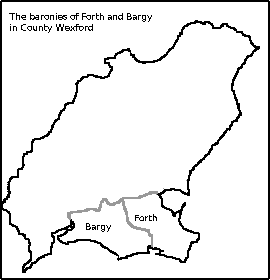

Yola, more commonly and historically the Forth and Bargy dialect, is an extinct dialect of the Middle English language once spoken in the baronies of Forth and Bargy in County Wexford, Ireland. As such, it was probably similar to the Fingallian dialect of the Fingal area. Both became functionally extinct in the 19th century when they were replaced by modern Hiberno-English. The word yola means 'old' in the dialect. In modern times, there have been efforts to revive the dialect.

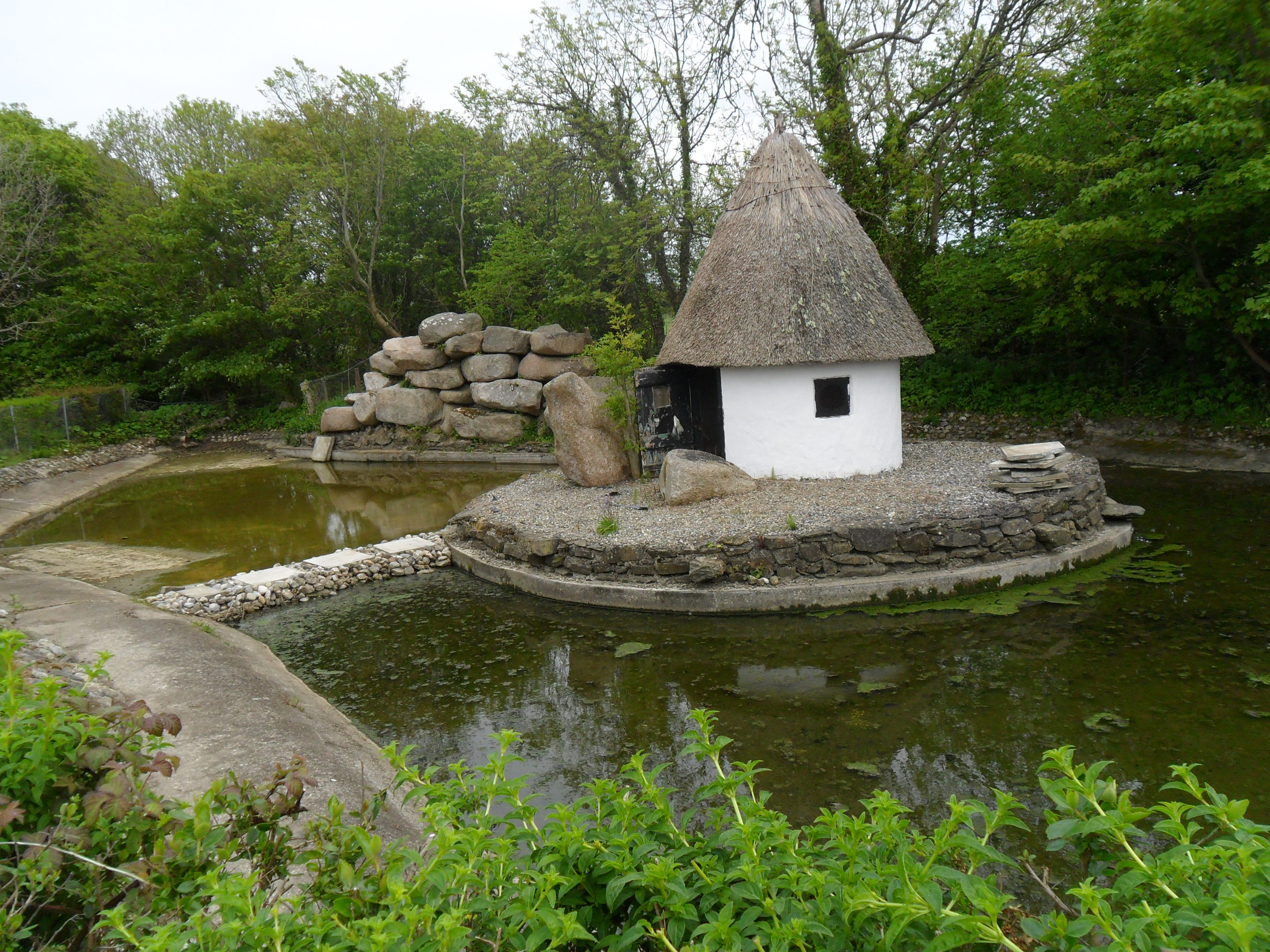
Yola hut refurbished in Tagoat, County Wexford, Ireland

== History ==
=== Origins ===
Forth and Bargy shown within Ireland

The dialect was spoken in County Wexford, particularly in the baronies of Forth and Bargy. This was the first area English speakers came to in the Norman invasion of Ireland, supporting the theory that it evolved from the Middle English introduced in that period. As such it is thought to have been similar to Fingallian, which was spoken in the Fingal region north of Dublin. Middle English, the mother tongue of the "Old English" community, was widespread throughout southeastern Ireland until the 14th century; as the Old English were increasingly assimilated into Irish culture, their original language was gradually displaced through Gaelicisation. After this point, Yola and Fingallian were the only attested relicts of this original form of English.

Modern English was widely introduced by British colonists during and after the 17th century, forming the basis for the modern Hiberno-English of Ireland. The new varieties were notably distinct from the surviving relict dialects. As English continued to spread, both Yola and Fingallian died out in the 19th century, though Yola continued to be used as a liturgical language by the churches of Wexford well into the 20th century. To this day the Kilmore Choir sings what were once Yola tunes, now adapted to Standard English.

The speech of Forth and Bargy was the only kind in Ireland included in Alexander John Ellis's work On Early English Pronunciation Volume V, which was the earliest survey of dialects of English. The phonetics of the dialect were taken from a local reverend.

=== Use after the mid-19th century ===
Though the Forth and Bargy dialect ceased to be used as a means of daily communication after the mid-19th century, it continued to see significant usage as a liturgical language, and some personal usage within the linguist community of Ireland, such as Kathleen Browne's letter to Ireland dated to 10 April 1893. Browne was a fluent Yola speaker and wrote a number of articles including "The Ancient Dialect of the Baronies of Forth and Bargy" in 1927. In 1952 N. A. Hudlestone observed that inhabitants of the area still used some of Yola vocabulary and phrases.

County Wexford native Paddy Berry is noted for his condensed performances of the piece "A Yola Zong", which he has performed for various recordings, the latest of which was in 2017. Various Yola rhymes, passed down from generation to generation, can be heard spoken by a Wexford woman in a documentary recorded in 1969 on the present usage and rememberers of Yola in the former baronies of Forth and Bargy.

Yola Farmstead, a community-operated reenactment of a Forth and Bargy village as it would have been during the 18th century, delivered a speech and performance of a song in Yola at their opening ceremony, featured Yola phrases in their advertisements, and hosted events where participants could learn some of the dialect from linguists and other experts on it. The Yola Farmstead also hosted a memorial event dedicated to Jack Devereux of the Kilmore Choir, which once used Yola extensively in their Christmas services. Devereux was a preservationist of, and well-versed in, Yola; locals considered him to be an expert on the dialect, and a rendition of the Lord's Prayer translated into Yola was read at his memorial.

The Yola Farm has since closed, but since 2021 there have been efforts to reopen it. Wikitongues also has a section dedicated to Yola on its website which hosts language documentation and revitalization resources.

== Phonology ==
As in the Dutch language, in southwestern varieties of English and (to a lesser extent) in German, most voiceless fricatives in Yola became voiced. The Middle English vowels are well-preserved, having only partially and sporadically undergone the changes associated with the Great Vowel Shift.

One striking characteristic of Yola was that stress shifted to the second syllable of words in many instances: morsaale "morsel", hatcheat "hatchet", dineare "dinner", readeare "reader", weddeen "wedding", etc.

== Orthography ==
An exact spelling system for Yola has never been codified, beyond general trends listed in Jacob Poole's writings. Most of the spellings are meant as comparisons to standard English ones of his day and the pronunciations are largely reconstructed. The following are listed here:

Yola orthography
Yola spelling	Phoneme (IPA)	Example	Notes
a	/a/, /ə/ (unstressed)	angerth "angered", aloghe "below"	
aa	/ɛː/	aany "any"	
ai, aai, ay, aay	/ej/	brail "barrel"	
au, aau, aw, aaw	/ɔː/	caure "care"	
b	/b/	bryne "brain"	
c	/k/, /s/ (before ⟨e, i, y⟩)	comfoort "comfort", laace "lace"	soft c used mainly in analogies to English words
ch	/tʃ/	chugh "chough"	also used for /x/
d	/d/	deed "dead"	
dh	/ð/	dhunder "thunder"	
e	/ɛ/, /ə/ (unstressed)	ess "ass, donkey", elles "else"	silent at the end of a word, but not in unstressed syllables
ea	/eː/	eale "eel"	
ee	/iː/	eeren "iron"	
ei, eei, ey, eey	/əj/	jeist "just now"	
eou, eow	/ew/	keow "cow"	
eu, ew	/iw/	vew "few"	
f	/f/, /v/ (word-initial)	flaase "fleece"	
g	/ɡ/, /dʒ/ (before ⟨e, i, y⟩)	greash "grace", burge "bridge"	soft g used mainly in analogies to English words
gh	/x/, /ɡ/ (word-initial)	faighe "faith", ghembols "pranks"	never silent possibly also /ɣ/
h	/h/	hoorn "horn"	silent in consonant clusters not listed here
i	/ɪ/	ing "in"	
ie	/aj/, /i/ (word-final)	ieen "eyes", vidie "where"	
j	/dʒ/	joudge "judge"	
k	/k/	kiver "cover"	
kh	/x/	teikh "to teach"	also used for /k/
l	/l/	laace "lace"	
m	/m/	mead "meadow"	
n	/n/	neesht "next"	
o	/ɔ/	ov "of"	rarely used alone
oa, o...e	/oː/	oan "one"	
oee	/oj/	joee "joy"	
oo	/uː/	oor "our"	
ou, oou	/ʊ/	goun "gun"	
ow	/ow/	howe "hoe (gardening tool)"	
p	/p/	pry "pray"	
ph	/f/	phen "when"	used mainly as an analogy to English words spelt with ⟨ph⟩ or ⟨wh⟩
qu	/kw/	querne "quern"	used mainly as an analogy to English words spelt with ⟨qu⟩
r	/r/	rooze "rouse"	
s	/s/, /z/ (word-initial)	scaul "scald"	
sh	/ʃ/	shoo "she"	
t	/t/	taape "tape"	
th	/θ/	thrist "trust"	also used for /ð/
u	/ɔ/	understhoane "understand"	
ui, uy	/uj/	buye "boy"	
v	/v/	vear "fear"	
w	/w/	wauste "waste"	
x	/ks/	voxe "fox"	used mainly as an analogy to English words spelt with ⟨x⟩
y	/ɪ/, /j/ (consonant)	mycheare "idler", yeat "gate"	
y...e, -ye	/aj/	gryne "grain"	
z	/z/	zister "sister"	
zh	/ʒ/	zheep "sheep"	

Note that the spellings can be somewhat inconsistent, due to many words attempting to draw comparison to English cognates and variation within the dialect. Not too much of the above, particularly regarding the vowels, is exactly certain.

== Grammar ==
=== Personal pronouns ===
Yola pronouns were similar to Middle English pronouns.

Yola personal pronouns
	1st person		2nd person		3rd person			
	Singular	Plural	Singular informal	plural / singular formal	Singular			Plural
	Singular	Plural	Singular informal	plural / singular formal	Feminine	Masculine	Inanimate	Plural
Nominative	ich	wough, wee	thou	ye	shoo	hea, he	it	hi; thye
Oblique	mee	ouse	thee	ye	her	him	it	aam
Genitive	mee	oore, oor, oure, our	thee	yer	*her	his	*his, *it(s)	aar
Reflexive	meezil	ourzels	theezil	yerzel, yerzels	*herzil	himzil	*itzil	aamzil

=== Articles ===
The definite article was at first a or ee, which was later replaced by the.

=== Verbs ===
Yola verbs had some conservative characteristics. The second and third person plural endings were sometimes -eth or -edh as in Chaucerian English. The past participle retained the Middle English "y" prefix as ee.

=== Nouns ===
Some nouns retained the -en plural of ME children, such as been 'bees' and tren 'trees'.

== Vocabulary ==
The glossary compiled by Jacob Poole provides most of what is known about the Forth and Bargy vocabulary. Poole was a farmer and member of the Religious Society of Friends (Quakers) from Growtown in the Parish of Taghmon on the border between the baronies of Bargy and Shelmalier. He collected words and phrases from his tenants and farm labourers between 1800 and his death in 1827.

Although most of its vocabulary is Old English in origin, Yola contains many borrowings from Irish and French.

All the Yola etymons are Middle English unless stated otherwise. Yola words derived from a non-standard Middle English form list the variant first, followed by the variant in parentheses.

=== Interrogative words ===
Yola interrogative words
English	Yola	Yola etymon	West Riding Yorkshire	Scots	West Frisian	Low Saxon
how	fowe how	wou how	haa	hou foo (Doric Scots)	hoe	wo/woans
what	fa(a)de	whad (what)	what	whit fit (Doric Scots)	wat	wat
when	fan/ phen/ van	whanne	when	whan fan (Doric Scots)	wannear	wanneer
where	fidi/ vidie/ vidy	whider	wheer	whaur faur (Doric Scots)	wêr	war/wor
which	wich wilk	whilch	which	whilk	hokker	welk
who	fo/ vo	hwā (Old English)	who/whoa	wha fa (Doric Scots)	wa	wer/wel/wokeen
why	fart(h)oo	wherto (why)	why	why fit wye (Doric Scots)	wêrom	worüm

=== Prepositions ===
Yola prepositions
English	Yola	Yola etymon	Yorkshire West Riding	Scots	West Frisian	Low Saxon
about	abut, abouten	abouten	abaat	aboot	om/rûn	üm/rund
above	aboo	abuven	aboon	abuin	boppe	baven
against	ayenst	ayens	agean/agen	agin	tsjin	gegen
among	amang, mang	amang	amang	amang	mank/tusken	mang/twüschen
around	arent	around	araand	aroond	om	üm
at	ad(h)	ed (at)	at	at	by	bi
before	avar	avore (afore)	afoor, befoor	afore	foar	vöör
below/beneath/under	aloghe	alow	below/beneeath/under	ablo/aneath/unner	ûnder	(to)neddern/nedder, ünnen/ünner
beside	besidh(e), besithe	beside	beside/aside	aside	njonken	blangen
between/betwixt	betweesk/beteesh	betwix	between/atween/betwixt/atwixt	atween/atweesh	(be)tusken	twüschen
by	be(e), bie, by	by	by/bi	by	by	bi
for	for, var, vor	vor (for)	for	for	foar	för
from	vre(a)m/ vreem/ vrim/ vrom	vram (fram)	fra/thra/throo	fae	fan	van, von, vun
next, next to	neeshte, nishte	next	next	neist	nêst	neven
in	i/ee/a, in(g), yn(g)	in	in/i	in	yn	in
out	udh, ut(h)	out	aat	oot	út	ut, uut
over	ow(e)r, oer	over	ovver/ower/o'er	ower	oer	över
through	draugh, trugh	thrugh	through/thrugh	throch	troch	dörch, dör, döör
upon	apan, (a)paa	upon	upon/upo'	upon/upo'	op	up, op
with	wee, wi, wough	with	wi	wi	mei	mit

=== Determiners ===
Yola determiners
English	Yola	Yola etymon	West Riding Yorkshire	Scots	West Frisian	Low Saxon
all	aul	all	all	aw	al	all
any	aany aught	any aught	ony	ony	elts	enig
each, every	earch(a)/ earchee/ erich/ iverich	everich	eeach, ivvery	ilk, ilka/ivery	eltse	elk, jeed/jeedeen
few	vew(e)	few	few, a two-or-thry	few/a wheen	min	wenig
neither	nother	nóhwæþer (Old English)	nawther	naither	noch	noch
none, nothing	noucht, nodhing	naught, nothing	noan, nowt	nane, nocht	nimmen, neat	nüms, nix
other	(th)o(o)ree	another	other	ither	oar	anner
some	zim/ zum	sum	some	some	guon	welke
that	d(h)cka		that	that	dat	dit, düt
this	d(h)icke		this	this	dizze	disse, düsse

=== Other words ===
Other Yola words
English	Yola	Yola etymon	Yorkshire West Riding	Scots	West Frisian	Low Saxon	Irish
day	dei, die	day	day	day	dei	Dag	lá
fear	vear ferde	fǽr (Old English) feerd	fear	fear	frees	Forcht, Bang, Angst	eagla
friend	vriene	frind (frend)	friend	fere	freon	Fründ	cara
land	loan(e)	lond (land)	land	laund	lân	Land	talamh, tír
old	yola, yole	eold (Old English eald)	owd	auld	âld	oold, oll-	sean, seanda, aosta
sun	zin	synne (sunne)	sun	sun	sinne	Sünn	grian
thing	dhing	thing	thing	hing	ting	Ding	rud, ní
go	goe	goan	go/goa	gae/gang/gan	gean	gaan	dul (go), imeacht (go away), gabháil (go along)
Wexford	Weis(e)forthe/Weis(e)ford	Veisafjǫrðr (Old Norse)	Wexford	Wexford	Wexford	Wexford	Loch Garman

=== Cardinal numbers ===
Yola cardinal numbers
#	Yola	Yola etymon	West Frisian
1	oan	oane	ien
2	twee, twi(ne), twy(n)(e)	tweyne	twa
3	d(h)rie, d(h)ree	thre	trij
4	vour, vowre	vour (four)	fjouwer
5	veeve	vyve (five)	fiif
6	zeese	siex (Old English six)	seis
7	zeven	seven	sân
8	ayght/ aught	eahta (Old English)	acht
9	neen	nine	njoggen
10	dhen	ten	tsien
20	dwanty	twonty (twenty)	tweintich
30	dhirtee	thirty	tritich
100	hindereth/ hundereth/ hunnert	hundred	hûndert

== Modern South Wexford English ==
Diarmaid Ó Muirithe travelled to South Wexford in 1978 to study the English spoken there. His informants ranged in age between 40 and 90. Among the long list of words still known or in use at that time are the following:

- amain: 'going on amain' = getting on well
- bolsker: an unfriendly person
- chy: a little
- drazed: threadbare
- fash: confusion, in a fash
- keek: to peep
- saak: to sunbathe, to relax in front of the fire
- quare: very, extremely
- wor: seaweed

Amain is a Norman word which means 'of easy use'.

== Examples ==
=== A Yola song ===
The following is a song in Yola with a rough translation into English.

A Yola Zong

Fade teil thee zo lournagh, co Joane, zo knaggee?
Th' weithest all curcagh, wafur, an cornee.
Lidge w'ouse an a milagh, tis gaay an louthee:
Huck nigher; y'art scuddeen; fartoo zo hachee?

Well, gosp, c'hull be zeid; mot thee fartoo, an fade;
Ha deight ouse var gabble, tell ee zin go t'glade.
Ch'am a stouk, an a donel; wou'll leigh out ee dey.
Th' valler w'speen here, th' lass ee chourch-hey.

Yerstey w'had a baree, gist ing oor hoane,
Aar gentrize ware bibbern, aamzil cou no stoane.
Yith Muzleare had ba hole, t'was mee Tommeen,
At by mizluck was ee-pit t'drive in.

Joud an moud vrem earchee ete was ee Lough.
Zitch vaperreen, an shimmereen, fan ee-daf ee aar scoth!
Zitch blakeen, an blayeen, fan ee ball was ee-drowe!
Chote well aar aim was t'yie ouz n'eer a blowe.

Mot w'all aar boust, hi soon was ee-teight
At aar errone was var ameing 'ar 'ngish ee-height.
Zitch vezzeen, tarvizzeen, 'tell than w'ne'er zey.
Nore zichel ne'er well, nowe, nore ne'er mey.

(There are nine more verses.)

Translation:

An Old Song

What ails you so melancholy, quoth John, so cross?
You seem all snappish, uneasy, and fretful.
Lie with us on the clover, 'tis fair and sheltered:
Come nearer; you're rubbing your back; why so ill-tempered?

Well, gossip, it shall be said; you ask what ails me, and for what;
You have put us in talk, till the sun goes to set.
I am a fool, and a dunce; we'll idle out the day.
The more we spend here, the less in the churchyard.

Yesterday we had a goal, just in our hand.
Their gentry were quaking, themselves could not stand.
If Good-for-little had been buried, it had been my Tommy,
Who by misluck was placed to drive in.

Throngs and crowds from each quarter were at the Lough;
Such vapouring, and shimmering, when stript in their shirts!
Such bawling, and shouting, when the ball was thrown!
I saw their aim was to give us ne'er a stroke.

But with all their bravado, they soon were taught
That their errand was aiming to bring anguish upon them.
Such driving, struggling, 'till then we ne'er saw.
Nor such never will, no, nor never may.

(There are nine more verses.)

=== Address to Lord Lieutenant in 1836 ===
Congratulatory address in the dialect of Forth and Bargy, presented to the Earl of Mulgrave, Lord Lieutenant of Ireland, on his visit to Wexford in 1836. Taken from the Wexford Independent newspaper of 15 February 1860. The paper's editor Edmund Hore wrote:

The most remarkable fact, in reality, in connexion with the address is this:—in all probability it was the first time Regal or Vice-regal ears were required to listen to words of such a dialect—and it is even still more probable that a like event will never happen again, for if the use of this old tongue die out as fast for the next five and twenty years as it has for the same bygone period, it will be utterly extinct and forgotten before the present century shall have closed.

In order for a person not acquainted with the pronunciation of the dialect to form anything like an idea of it, it is first necessary to speak slowly, and remember that the letter a has invariably the same sound, like a in "father." Double ee sounds as e in "me," and in most words of two syllables the long accent is placed on the last. To follow the English pronunciation completely deprives the dialect of its peculiarities.

To's Excellencie Constantine Harrie Phipps, y' Earle Mulgrave, "Lord Lieutenant-General and General Governor of Ireland," Ye soumissive Spakeen o'ouz Dwelleres o' Baronie Forthe, Weisforthe.

MAIST BE PLEASANT TO TH' ECCELLENCIE, Wee, Vassales o' "His Most Gracious Majesty," Wilyame ee Vourthe, an, az wee verilie chote, na coshe an loyale dwelleres na Baronie Forthe, crave na dicke luckie acte t'uck neicher th' Eccellencie, an na plaine garbe o' oure yola talke, wi vengem o' core t'gie oure zense o' y grades whilke be ee-dighte wi yer name; and whilke we canna zei, albeit o' 'Governere,' 'Statesman,' an alike. Yn ercha an aul o' while yt beeth wi gleezom o' core th' oure eyen dwytheth apan ye Vigere o'dicke Zouvereine, Wilyame ee Vourthe, unnere fose fatherlie zwae oure daiez be ee-spant, az avare ye trad dicke londe yer name waz ee-kent var ee vriene o' livertie, an He fo brake ye neckares o' zlaves. Mang ourzels—var wee dwytheth an Irelonde az ure generale haime—y'ast, bie ractzom o'honde, ee-delt t'ouz ye laas ee-mate var ercha vassale, ne'er dwythen na dicke waie nar dicka. Wee dwyth ye ane fose dais be gien var ee gudevare o'ye londe ye zwae,—t'avance pace an livertie, an, wi'oute vlynch, ee garde o' generale reights an poplare vartue. Ye pace—yea, we mai zei, ye vaste pace whilke bee ee-stent owr ye londe zince th'ast ee-cam, proo'th, y'at wee alane needeth ye giftes o'generale rights, az be displayte bie ee factes o'thie goveremente. Ye state na dicke daie o'ye londe, na whilke be nar fash nar moile, albiet "constitutional agitation," ye wake o'hopes ee-blighte, stampe na yer zwae be rare an lightzom. Yer name var zetch avancet avare ye, e'en a dicke var hye, arent whilke ye brine o'zea an ye cragges o'noghanes cazed nae balke. Na oure glades ana whilke we dellt wi' mattoke, an zing t'oure caules wi plou, wee hert ee zough o'ye colure o' pace na name o' Mulgrave. Wi Irishmen owre generale hopes be ee-bond—az Irishmen, an az dwelleres na cosh an loyale o' Baronie Forthe, w'oul daie an ercha daie, our meines an oure gurles, praie var long an happie zins, shorne o'lournagh an ee-vilt wi benisons, an yerzel an oure gude Zovereine, till ee zin o'oure daies be var aye be ee-go t'glade.

English Translation

To his Excellency, Constantine Henry Phipps, Earl of Mulgrave, Lord Lieutenant-General, and General Governor of Ireland. The humble Address of the Inhabitants of the Barony of Forth, Wexford.

MAY IT PLEASE YOUR EXCELLENCY—We, the subjects of his Most Gracious Majesty, William IV., and, as we truly believe, both faithful and loyal inhabitants of the Barony of Forth, beg leave at this favourable opportunity to approach your Excellency, and in the simple dress of our old dialect to pour forth from the strength (or fulness) of our hearts, our sense (or admiration) of the qualities which characterise your name, and for which we have no words but of "Governor," "Statesman," &c. In each and every condition it is with joy of heart that our eyes rest upon the representative of that Sovereign, William IV., under whose paternal rule our days are spent; for before your foot pressed the soil, your name was known to us as the friend of liberty, and he who broke the fetters of the slave. Unto ourselves—for we look on Ireland to be our common country—you have with impartial hand ministered the laws made for every subject, without regard to this party or that. We behold in you one whose days are devoted to the welfare of the land you govern, to promote peace and liberty—the uncompromising guardian of the common right and public virtue. The peace—yes, we may say the profound peace—which overspreads the land since your arrival, proves that we alone stood in need of the enjoyment of common privileges, as is demonstrated by the results of your government. The condition, this day, of the country, in which is neither tumult nor disorder, but that constitutional agitation, the consequence of disappointed hopes, confirms your rule to be rare and enlightened. Your fame for such came before you even into this retired spot, to which neither the waters of the sea below nor the mountains above caused any impediment. In our valleys, where we were digging with the spade, or as we whistled to our horses in the plough, we heard the distant sonnd of the wings of the dove of peace, in the word Mulgrave. With Irishmen our common hopes are inseparably bound up—as Irishmen, and as inhabitants, faithful and loyal, of the Barony Forth, we will daily and every day, our wives and our children, implore long and happy days, free from melancholy and full of blessings, for yourself and our good Sovereign, until the sun of our lives be gone down the dark valley (of death).

=== "The maiden of Rosslare" ===
This following is a Yola poem from an original document containing accents to aid pronunciation;

Ee mýdhe ov Rosslaarè
'Cham góeen to tell thee óa taale at is drúe
Aar is ing Rosslaarè óa mýdhe geoudè an drúe
Shoo wearth ing her haté óa ribbonè at is blúe
An shoo goeth to ee faaythè earchee deie too
Ich meezil bee ing ee faaythè éarchee deie zoo
At ich zee dhicka mýdhe fhó is geoudè an drúe
An ich bee to ishólthè ee mýdhe, ee mýdhe at is drúe
An fhó coome to ee faaythè wi' ribbonè blue
'Chull meezil góe to Rosslaaré earche deie too
to zie thaar ee mydhe wee her ribbonè blúe
An 'chull her estólté vor her ribbonè blúe
ee mýdhe at is lyghtzóm, an well wytheen an drúe
Ich loove ee mýdhe wee ee ribbonè blúe
At coome to ee faaythè éarchee arichè too
Fan 'cham ing ee faaythè éarchee arichè too
To estóthè mýdhe wee ee ribbons blúe

Translation:

The maiden of Rosslare
I'm going to tell you a tale that is true
there is in Rosslare a maid good and true
she wears in her hat a ribbon that is blue
and she goes to the faythe every day too
I myself am in the faythe every day so
that I see this maid who is good and true
and I go to meet the maid, the maid that is true
and who comes to the faythe with ribbons blue
I myself will go to Rosslare every day too
to see there the maid with her ribbons blue
And I will meet her for her ribbons blue
the maid that is enlightened and good looking and true
I love the maid with the ribbons blue
that comes to the faythe every morning too
when I'm in the faythe every morning too
to meet the maid with the ribbons blue

=== "A song of Barony Forth" ===
This following is a Yola poem taken from Kathleen Brownes glossary of Forth and Bargy

A Zong o' Barony Forth
'Bileen Scalaane an' heas yola mawen
Thaaye heighed up a buckeen twye oores avar dawn
Thay paaced awye to ee cross o' chad
Fan buckeen hea pooked lick oan dhing mad
"Fan a ghoul ez upa thee, thou stouck?" Co Billeen
If thou dinna gow on, chull daff thee yola skien
Wi' spur o heas heel hea gay him a goad
Fan Sooney shoo vell flat apa road
Co Sooney, "Billeen, dowst thee zee faads lewere"
Al haar an wi' eyen lick torches o' tar.
Fan a loughraan itzil feighed a big bawl
Tus a gearth ad feardeth Billeens yola caule.

Translation:

A song of Barony Forth
Billy Scallan and he's old wife
They mounted upon buckeen (The name of their horse) two hours before dawn
They paced away up to the cross of shad
When buckeen started bucking like a thing gone mad
"What the devil is up with you?" says Billy
If you don't go on I'll strip your old skin
With a spur of hes heel he gave him a kick
and then Alice (Sooney) fell flat onto the road
Says Alice, "Billy do you see what's beyonder?"
All hair and with eyes like torches of tar
When the ghost itself gave a big bawl
It was just a billy goat that frightened Billys old horse

=== "Three old maidens" ===
This following is a Yola poem taken from Kathleen Brownes glossary of Forth and Bargy

Dhree Yola Mythens
'Haar wee bee, dhree yola mydes,
Fho naar had look var to be brides,
Fho no oan caars fader betides,
Dhree yola mythens.
Wu canna baar to gow aveel,
But zit ad hime wi vlaxen wheel,
An vish aal vellas wi a deel,
Dhree yola mythens.
Wu canna gow to Ilone vaar,
Thaar's no own aal to taak uz thaar
Or i a vaarin gees a shaar,
Dhree yola mythens.
Wu canna gow bee chapaal gaat,
But aal a bys do leigh an praat,
Zyin " Thaar gows Peg an Moll an Kaat
Dhree yola mythens."
Wu'll gow our wys to Chour Hill,
An thaar zit down an yux our vill,
An eachy tear ud shule a mill
Dhree yola mythens.

Translation:

Song of Three Old Maidens
Here we are three old maids,
Who never had luck to be brides,
Whom no one cares what here betides,
Three old maidens.
We cannot bear to go abroad,
But sit at home with the flaxen wheel,
And wish all men with the divil,
Three old maidens.
We cannot go to the Island fair,
There's no one at all to take us there,
Or of the fairing give us a share,
Three old maidens.
We cannot go near the chapel gate,
But all the boys do laugh and prate,
Saying there goes Peg and Moll and Kate,
Three old maidens.
We'll go our ways to Chour Hill,
And there sit down and sob our fill,
And every tear would turn a mill,
Three old maidens.
