= Coccagee =

Apple cultivar

'Coccagee'
- Species: Malus domestica
- Origin: Ireland, before 1700s.

The Coccagee (from the Irish cac a' gheidh, "dung of the goose"), also spelt 'Cackagee' or 'Cockagee' and sometimes known as the 'Irish Crab' or 'Lord Cork's Crab', is or was a variety of cider apple, known in Ireland and the West of England.

== History ==
Hogg described the 'Coccagee' as "one of the oldest and best of cider apples". He noted that the variety originated in Ireland, but in c. 1710 it was taken to Somerset and promoted in the area around Minehead as suitable for cider, after which it was commonly planted in the west of England. It was also known in Wales under the name afal baw gwydd ("goose dung apple").

In Ireland it was found in many estate orchards in counties Clare and Limerick, and was regarded as an important part of local cider production, with barrels of single-varietal Coccagee cider fetching a high premium. Wakefield's 1812 Account of Ireland stated that "the celebrated cackagee apple is found near a town called Six Mile Bridge, in the County of Clare".

Richard Graves referred to the variety, and its harshly acidic flavour, in his poem Hymen and Pomona: "Some, proud of sense and ill-bred wit / Are harsh as Coccagee".

By the early 19th century it was often said to be the most favoured variety for cidermaking even in England, but by the end of the century it had been supplanted by newer cultivars and was little known. Irish domestic cider production contracted after the Great Famine and subsequent emigration, and the Coccagee also became rare in its country of origin.

The variety is currently thought to be lost, both in England and Ireland, but the Gloucestershire Orchard Trust has recently explored the suggestion that the old local variety 'Hen's Turd' may in fact be the 'Coccagee'.

== Characteristics ==
As with several other very old varieties of cider apple, such as the Styre, the 'Coccagee' was a vigorous tree that could be propagated simply by striking a cutting in the earth, and this method of propagation was common in Ireland.

The fruit of the 'Coccagee' is small to medium-sized, ovate or conical, with pale yellow, green-flecked skin, the colour of which probably gave the variety its name. The flesh is yellowish white and acidic, the juice fermenting to a pale, straw coloured cider compared to Canary wine. Hogg described the apple as "perhaps the most harsh and austere apple known, and generally considered only fit for cider", but added "it is one of the best for all culinary purposes [...] as it possesses a particularly rich flavour when cooked".
