= Súgán =

Irish word for straw rope

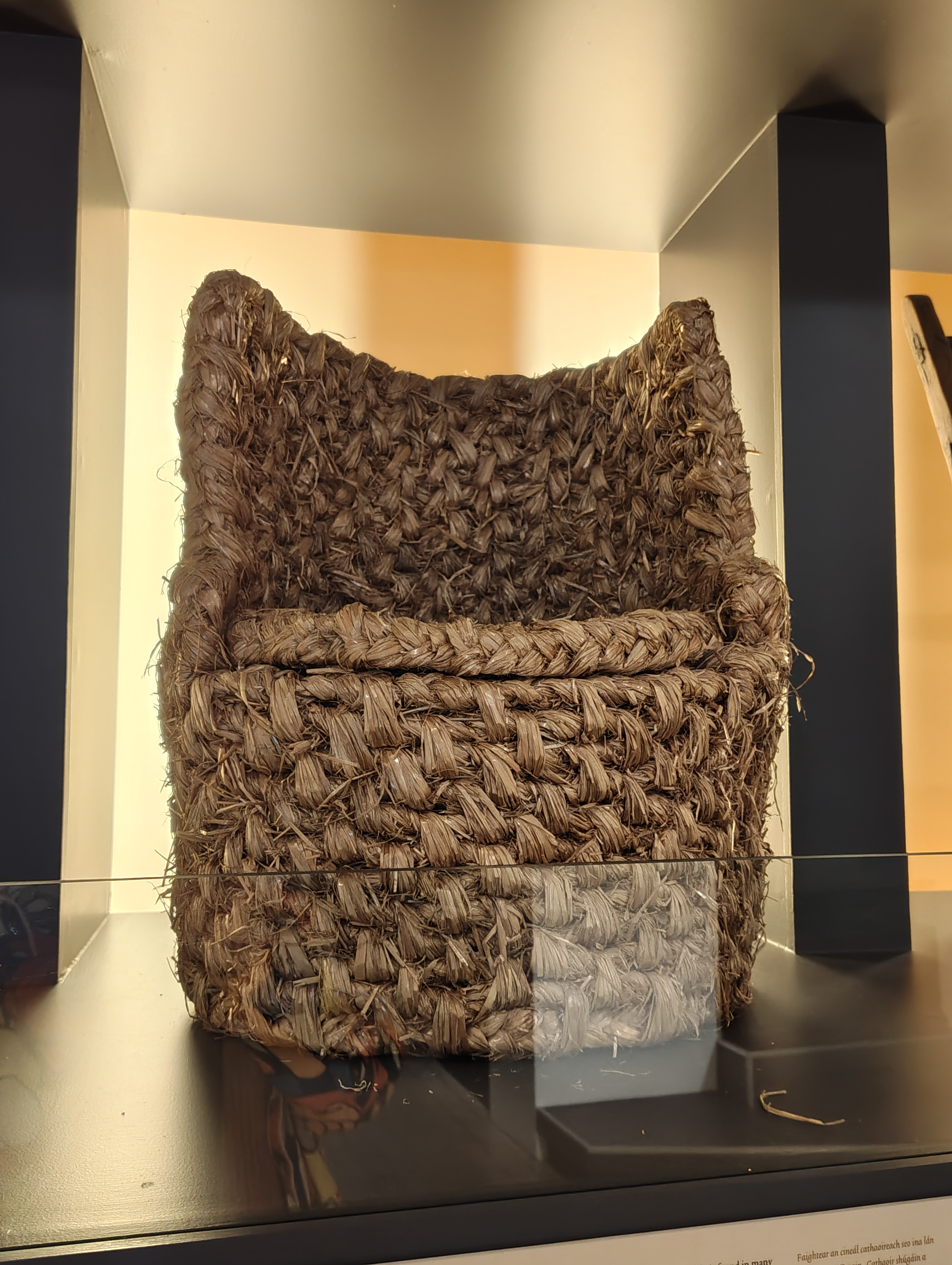
Woven Súgán chair in the National Museum of Ireland, Collins Barracks

Súgán or súgán cotháin is a form of rope made from straw in Ireland, being the Irish word for straw-rope.

== Uses ==
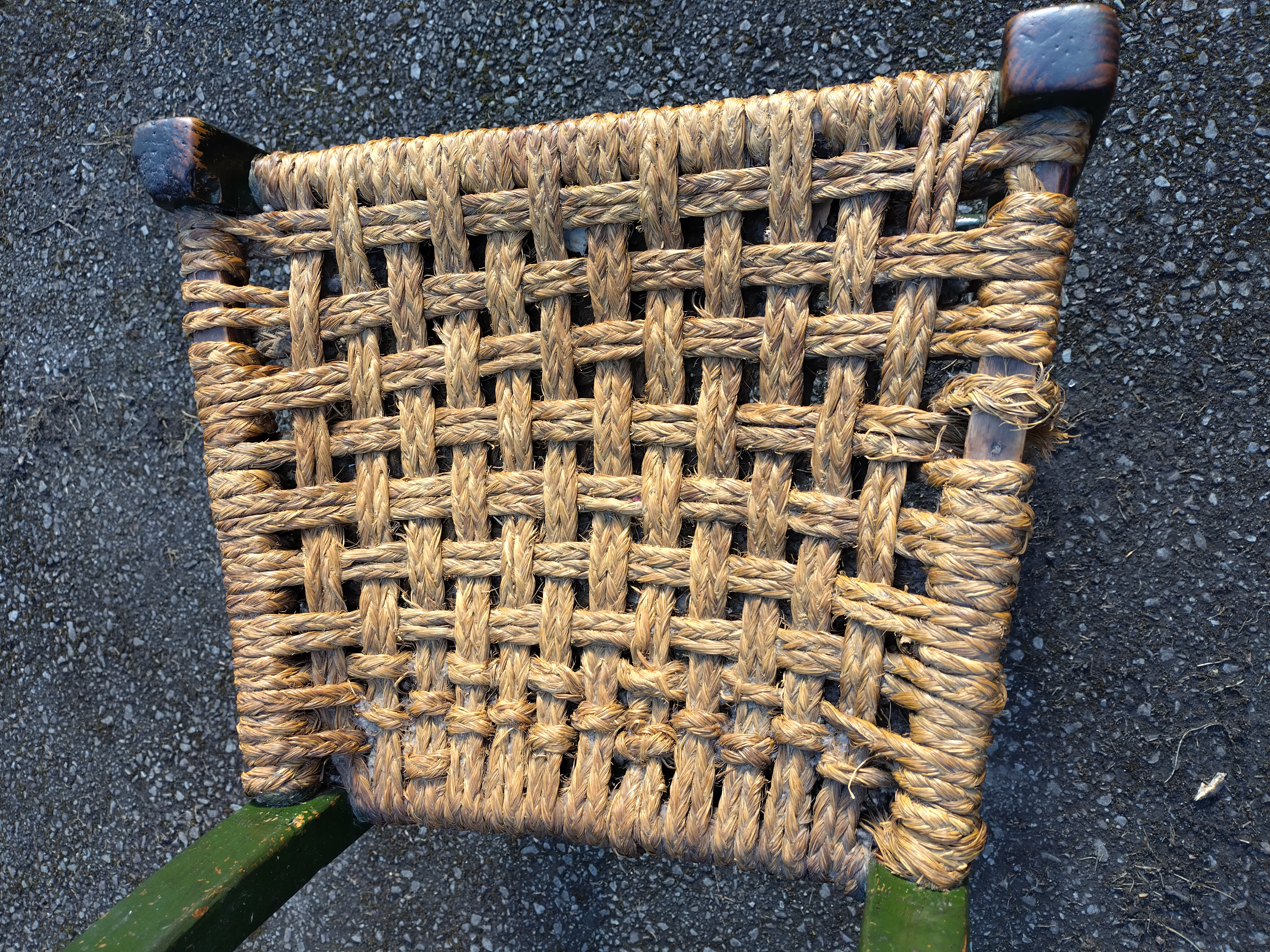
A Súgán chair's woven straw seat

Súgán as a rope has many uses, being used as a weaving material to make household items such as cradles and baskets. The most recognisable use of it is that of a woven chair seat, commonly known as a súgán chair. These chairs tended to have a wooden frame, and the seat being made by weaving súgán through the frame. Some of these chairs look more like an armchair, with the entire body being wrapped in the rope.

== Pejorative term ==
Súgán has also been used as a pejorative term in the Irish language, the nearest English equivalent being "a man of straw". The term is most commonly used in reference to James FitzThomas FitzGerald, the 16th Earl of Desmond, whose title and authority were never recognised by his family's traditional supporters and who is remembered today as "the Súgán Earl".
