= Rosslare =

Rosslare may refer to:

- Rosslare Strand, a village in County Wexford, Ireland
- Rosslare Harbour, a village in County Wexford, Ireland
- The Rosslare Europort, at Rosslare Harbour
