= Tagoat =

Village in County Wexford, Ireland

Tagoat Teach Gót
- Village
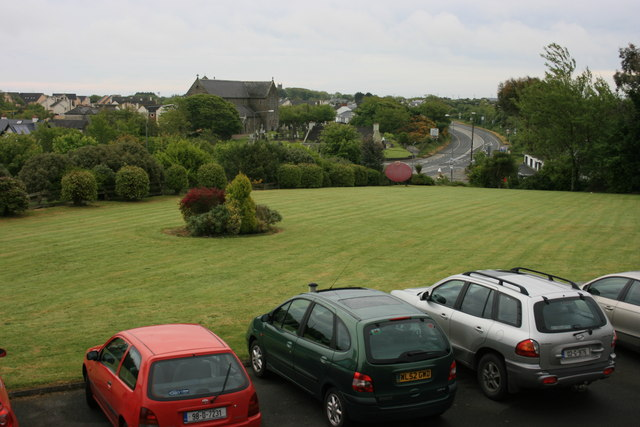
- Village and N25 road

- Location in Ireland
- Coordinates: 52°14′38″N 6°23′20″W
- Country: Ireland
- Province: Leinster
- County: County Wexford
- Time zone: UTC+0 (WET)
  - Summer (DST): UTC-1 (IST (WEST))

Tagoat (Irish: Teach Gót) is a village in County Wexford, Ireland. It is located on the N25 and R736 roads, to the west of Rosslare Harbour.

The village is located in the historic barony of Forth. It has a Catholic church dedicated to St. Mary. The local Gaelic Athletic Association (GAA) club is St Mary's Rosslare GAA.

== See also ==
- List of towns and villages in Ireland
