= Fingallian =

Extinct Middle English dialect of eastern Ireland

- Native to: Ireland
- Region: Fingal
- Era: attested from 17th century
- Language family: Indo-European: Germanic; West Germanic; North Sea Germanic; Anglo-Frisian; Anglic; Old West Saxon; Fingallian
- Early forms: Proto-Indo-European: Proto-Germanic; Proto-West Germanic; Proto-English; West Saxon Old English; Early Middle English

Language codes
- ISO 639-3: None (mis)
- Glottolog: east2834 fing1234

Fingallian or the Fingal dialect is an extinct dialect of Early Middle English formerly spoken in Fingal, Ireland. It is thought to have been an offshoot of Early Middle English, which was brought to Ireland during the Norman invasion, and was extinct by the mid-19th century. Although little is known of Fingallian, it is thought to have been similar to the Yola dialect of County Wexford.

The surviving literature of Fingallian consists of two satirical or humorous poems, the short "Fingallian Dance" and the much longer Purgatorium Hibernicum. Both poems are anonymous and are thought to be humorous parodies of Fingallian.

== History ==
=== Origins ===
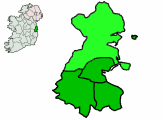
Ireland (left) and County Dublin (right), with Fingal in light green

Fingallian was spoken in the region of Fingal, traditionally the part of County Dublin north of the River Tolka. It was spoken in the area near the northern border. The name "Fingal" is from the Irish Fine Gall, or "territory of foreigners", probably a reference to a Norse settlement in the area. The linguist Alf Sommerfelt proposed Old Norse influence on the Fingallian dialect, but later scholars have found no evidence of such a connection.

Like the Yola dialect of Forth and Bargy in County Wexford, Fingallian is thought to have derived from Early Middle English, which was introduced by "West Saxon Old English" settlers after the Anglo-Norman invasion of Ireland in 1169, and Leinster Irish. Early Middle English was well established in southeastern Ireland until the 14th century, when the area was re-Gaelicized and English was displaced. As such, the Yola and Fingal dialects would have been the only attested relicts of this original English variety in Ireland.

== The Fingallian Dance ==
The poem most likely to have been composed by a native speaker of Fingallian is The Fingallian Dance, a brief, three-stanza poem written between about 1650 and 1660. It is a mildly indecent poem about a man going to see dancers at a bullring (bull fighting was practised in 17th century Ireland). Although the poem is likely to have been standardised when written down, it gives a flavour of Fingallian, particularly forms like fat for "what" or fen for "when". Other words that need explanation are ame for "them", plack-keet for "placket" (a slit at the top of a petticoat, here used to mean a vulva), and abateing for "abutting, bordering on".

The Fingallian Dance c.1650

On a day in the Spring,
As I went to bolring
To view the jolly Daunciers,
They did trip it so high
(Be me shole!) I did spee [By my soul, I did spy]
Six Cunts abateing Seav'n hairs.

But wondering on 'ame,
Fat make 'em so tame
Fen de catch at their plack-keet,
The maids of y-yore
Wou'd y-cree, and y-rore,
And y-make o foul Rac-keet.

But fire take 'ame, [to hell with them!]
They made me ashame,
And when I went home to me weef
And told her the Chaunce [chance, here meaning "account"]
Of the Maids in the Daunce,
'Peace thy prateing', say'd shee, 'for dee Leef!' ["Quieten thy prating, for thy life!", i.e. "Keep quiet, for goodness' sake!"]

== Purgatorium Hibernicum ==
The Purgatorium Hibernicum is a humorous and bawdy burlesque or travesty on the Roman poet Virgil's Aeneid. It exists in three versions: the original manuscript (Purgatoriam Hibernicum), another manuscript entitled The Fingallian Travesty: the Sixt Book of Virgill's Aenoeids a la mode de Fingaule (1670–5), and a printed version called The Irish Hudibras or The Fingallian Burlesque (1689).

Virgil's prince Aeneas and his noble lover Dido are transformed into a bumbling young Fingallian called 'Prince' Nees and a coarse ex-nun Dydy. The names of all the characters are converted into mock 'Irish' forms and the places mentioned in Virgil's text become places in Fingal. Part of the humour for the Anglo-Irish readers of the poem is that Nees and Dydy converse with each other in broad Fingallian. Although the intention is supposedly to mock their speech, it is rendered with such vitality and wit that the effect is actually to give the reader an appreciation of its richness.

The short extract below provides a good example of Fingallian. In it Nees encounters Dydy again and seeing her look pale and unwell realises that he may have been responsible for giving her the 'flame' or venereal disease. A few features need explanation: 'V' is used instead of 'W' in Fingallian; 'suggam' is a kind of straw rope'; 'Ful dea ro' is derived from Irish fuil Dé, a rogha 'God's blood, my sweetheart':

'Sure, Sure!' sayes Nees, 'dis me old vench is!'
But when he drew more neare her quarters,
And know her by her suggam garters,
'Ful dea, ro, dou unlucky jade,
I'll chance upon dee! Art thou dead?
Fat devill vas be in dee, vench?
Vas he soe hot is cou'd no quench
De flame?' Indeed, oh no! but Nees chief
Occasion is of all dis mischeif'.

Nees continues with an attempt to sweet talk Dydys and asks her for a 'pogue', but his fears are justified and Dydy is having none of it. She tells him that if he think he can have another 'bout' with her, he can think again – after he has play'd the vagge (been a wag) with her and given her the bagge (rejected her) she will vatch de vales ('watch the walls', be on guard) and foil his plan:

'I, Nees', sayes she in mighty snuffe,
'and be! is tink is varm enough,
If dou cam shance but to find out
Dee old consort to have a bout –
and den, fen dou has play'd de vagge,
to give me, as before, de bagge!
Butt I will vatch de vales, Nees,
And putt foile on dee by dis chees,'

Then Dydy goes on her way in high dudgeon.

== Letters from Ireland ==
In John Dunton's Letters from Ireland (1698) he writes that in Fingal "they have a sort of jargon speech peculiar to themselves, and understand not one word of Irish, and are as little understood by the English". Dunton gives a sample of the language: a lamentation that a mother made over the grave of her son, who was a keen fisher and hunter. Note that a roon and moorneeng are from the Irish a rúin "(secret) love" (vocative) and múirnín "love" (lit. "little trust"):

Ribbeen a roon
Ribbeen moorneeng
Thoo ware good for loand stroand and mounteen
For rig a tool and roast a whiteen
Reddy tha taakle
Gather tha baarnacks
Drink a grote at Nauny Hapennys

This is roughly translated as:

Robin my love
Robin my dear
Thou wast good for land, strand and mountain
Good with a tool and [at] roast[ing] a whiting
Ready the tackle
Gather the bannocks
Drink a groat at Nanny Halfpenny's [alehouse]

== Modern Fingal English ==
Although Fingallian is no longer spoken, a large number of dialect words unique to Fingal have survived, especially in traditional Fingal towns and villages such as Swords (now a large suburb of Dublin), Skerries, Rush, Lusk, Donabate, Garristown, Oldtown, Balrothery, Portrane and Naul. Major sources for these include glossaries in an article in the folklore Journal Béaloideas by J. J. Hogan and Patrick O'Neill and a book on Fingal lore entitled Fair Fingall by Patrick Archer.

Examples from Archer's Glossary include:

- Cinnit (pronounced with hard 'C') – a dodger, trickster
- Cloustered – covered up in clothes
- Dalk – a thorn, Ir. dealg
- Dawney – delicate, weak
- Glauming – groping
- Lawneyday – an exclamation of surprise or regret, Ir. Láine Dé
- Mullacking – working or walking in mud
- Possing – sopping wet
- Rossie – robust, blustering female
- Scut – a short, mean person, a wren

Examples from Hogan and O'Neill's Glossary include:

- Barney – a quarrel, a row
- Bunched – ruined, finished
- Buthoon – a bad blunder, Ir. Botún
- Clift – an idiot, especially a normally sensible person who has done something stupid
- Cobby – cunning, worldly wise
- Dugging – prodding or punching a person, fighting
- Foopah – a blunder, Fr. faux pas
- Gollockers – eyes (contemptuously)
- Go-boy – a sly fellow who goes about doing harm in secret
- Launa-wallya – something to think about 'a bellyful', Ir. Lán a' mhála (meaning 'bagful')
- Malavogue – to beat or maul
- Moggy – a fat lazy person
- Randyvoo – a house where people meet for a chat or mischief, Fr. rendez-vous
- Raucie – a girl given to gadding about
- Simmy-saumy – a foolish-looking person
- Squib – a word used to address a stranger, esp. a boy e.g. 'hey, squib'
- Tamboo – a shebeen, a miserable looking house
- Whack – nothing, nobody, Ir. faic

== See also ==
- History of the English language
- Hiberno-English

== Notes ==
- Archer, Patrick (1975). Fair Fingall. An Taisce (reprint).
- Hogan, J. J.; O'Neill, Patrick C. (1947). A North County Dublin Glossary. Béaloideas 17. pp. 262–283.
- Kerrigan, John (2008). Archipelagic English. Oxford University Press. p. 64. ISBN 978-0-19-818384-6.
- McCrum, Robert; Cran, William; MacNeil, Robert (1993). The Story of English. Penguin (Non-classics). p. 182. ISBN 0-14-015405-1.
