= East Shelmaliere =

Barony in County Wexford, Ireland

East Shelmaliere Síol Maoluír Thoir (Irish)
- Barony
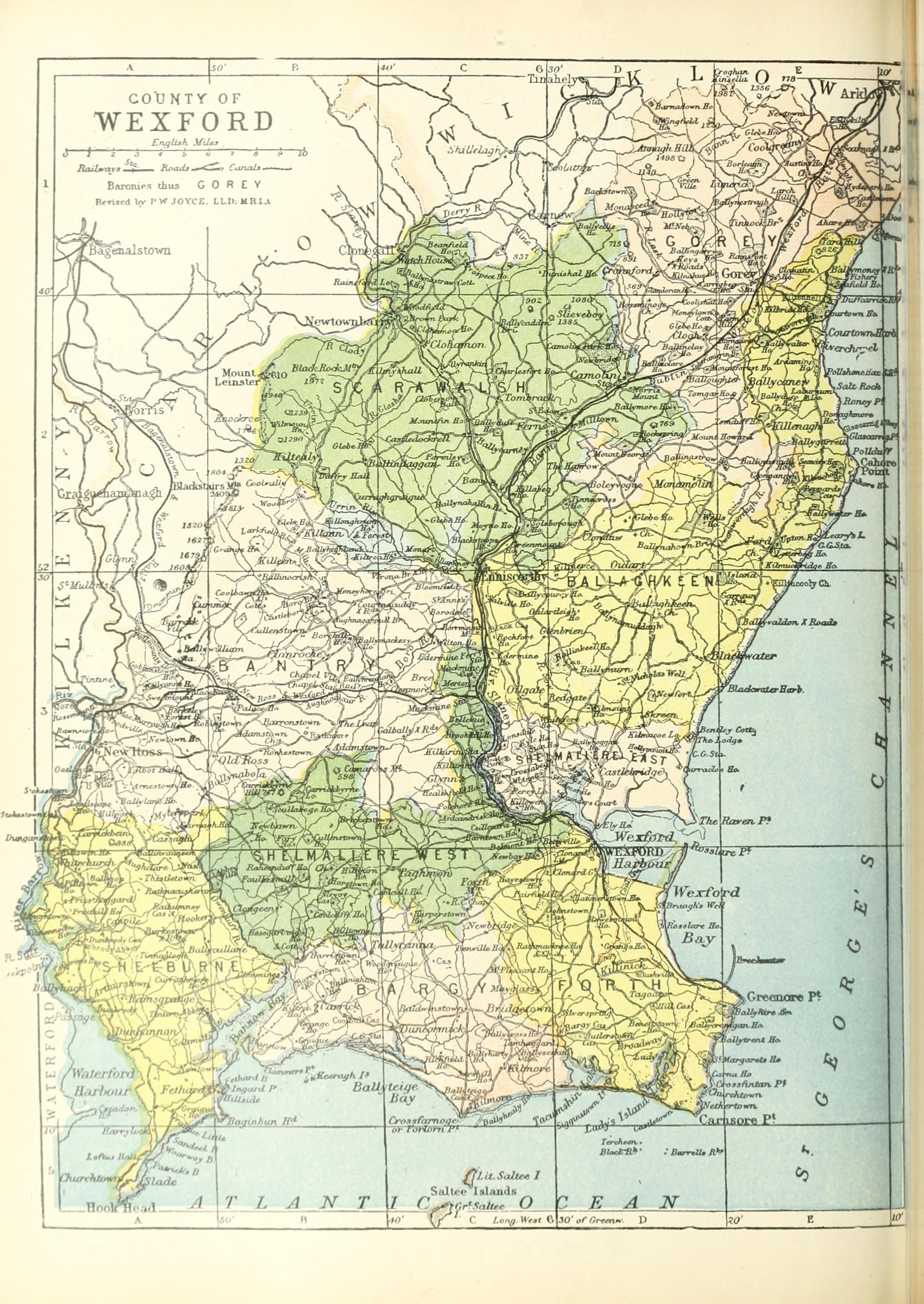
- Barony map of County Wexford, 1900; East Shelmaliere barony is in the southwest, coloured yellow.

- Location within Ireland
- Coordinates: 52°23′N 6°28′W
- Sovereign state: Ireland
- Province: Leinster
- County: Wexford

Area
  - Total: 203.6 km^{2} (78.6 sq mi)

East Shelmaliere, also called Shelmaliere East, (Irish: Síol Maoluír Thoir) is a historical barony in southwest County Wexford, Ireland.

Baronies were mainly cadastral rather than administrative units. They acquired modest local taxation and spending functions in the 19th century before being superseded by the Local Government (Ireland) Act 1898.

== History ==
The barony takes its name from the local tribe, the Síl Máel Uidir, "Seed of Bald Uidir."

== Geography ==
East Shelmaliere is in the south of the county, west of the River Slaney and north of Wexford Harbour.

== List of settlements ==
Settlements within the historical barony of East Shelmaliere include:

- Castlebridge
- Crossabeg
- Curracloe
