= Bargy =

Barony in County Wexford, Ireland

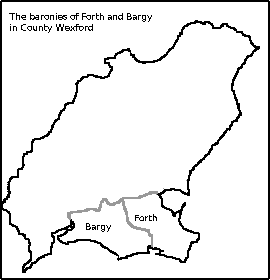
Barony of Bargy in County Wexford, Ireland

Bargy is a barony in County Wexford, Ireland. From the 12th century Bargy and the surrounding area, including the barony of Forth, saw extensive Anglo-Norman settlement following the Norman invasion of Ireland. A distinctive Anglic language, known as the Yola language or simply Yola, was spoken in this area into the late 19th century.
