= Rayment =

Rayment is an English surname of Old Norman origin. It derives from the given name Raymond. Notable people with the surname include:

- Alan Rayment (1928–2020), English cricketer
- Doug Rayment (1910–1978), Australian rules footballer
- Ivan Rayment, British molecular biologist and crystallographer
- Joe Rayment (footballer, born 1906) (1906–1969), English footballer
- Joe Rayment (footballer, born 1934) (1934–2019), English footballer
- Kenneth Rayment (1921–1958), British pilot
- Pat Rayment (born 1965), English former football player and manager
- Paul Rayment (born 1965), South African cricketer
- Ricky Rayment, English television personality (born 1990)
- Tarlton Rayment (1882–1964), Australian artist, author, broadcaster, poet, naturalist, entomologist and beekeeper
