= History of English =

Timeline of the English language
← / 1066: Norman Conquest; replacement of Germanic elite with Norman French speakers; ← / c. 800–950: Viking invasions; assimilation of words from Old Norse and simplification of Old English grammar; ← / c. 1600: the British Empire helps spread English around the world; ← / Growth of cinema, popular music, the Internet, and other English dominant media; ← / c. 450: Settlement of Anglo-Saxon tribes in England speaking Germanic dialects; ← / c. 1400–1700: Great Vowel Shift

English is a West Germanic language that originated from Ingvaeonic languages brought to Britain in the mid-5th to 7th centuries AD by Anglo-Saxon migrants from what is now northwest Germany, southern Denmark and the Netherlands. The Anglo-Saxons settled in the British Isles from the mid-5th century and came to dominate the bulk of southern Great Britain. Their language originated as a group of Ingvaeonic languages which were spoken by the settlers in England and southern and eastern Scotland in the early Middle Ages, displacing the Celtic languages, and, possibly, British Latin, that had previously been dominant. Old English reflected the varied origins of the Anglo-Saxon kingdoms established in different parts of Britain. The Late West Saxon dialect eventually became dominant. A significant subsequent influence upon the shaping of Old English came from contact with the North Germanic languages spoken by the Scandinavian Vikings who conquered and colonized parts of Britain during the 8th and 9th centuries, which led to much lexical borrowing and grammatical simplification. The Anglian dialects had a greater influence on Middle English.

After the Norman Conquest in 1066, Old English was replaced, for a time, by Anglo-Norman, also known as Anglo-Norman French, as the language of the upper classes. This is regarded as marking the end of the Old English or Anglo-Saxon era, as during this period the English language was heavily influenced by Anglo-Norman, developing into a phase known now as Middle English. The conquering Normans spoke a Romance langue d'oïl called Old Norman, which in Britain developed into Anglo-Norman. Many Norman and French loan words entered the local language in this period, especially in vocabulary related to the church, the court system, and the government. As Normans are descendants of Vikings who invaded France, Norman French was influenced by Old Norse, and many Norse loanwords in English came directly from French. Middle English was spoken to the late 15th century. The system of orthography that was established during the Middle English period is largely still in use today. Later changes in pronunciation, combined with the adoption of various foreign spellings, mean that the spelling of modern English words appears highly irregular.

Early Modern English – the language used by William Shakespeare – is dated from around 1500. It incorporated many Renaissance-era loans from Latin and Ancient Greek, as well as borrowings from other European languages, including French, German and Dutch. Significant pronunciation changes in this period included the Great Vowel Shift, which affected the qualities of most long vowels. Modern English proper, similar in most respects to that spoken today, was in place by the late 17th century.

English as we know it today was exported to other parts of the world through British colonisation, and is now the dominant language in Britain and Ireland, the United States and Canada, Australia, New Zealand and many smaller former colonies, as well as being widely spoken in India, parts of Africa, and elsewhere. Partially due to influence of the United States and its globalized efforts of commerce and technology, English took on the status of a global lingua franca in the second half of the 20th century. This is especially true in Europe, where English has largely taken over the former roles of French and, much earlier, Latin as a common language used to conduct business and diplomacy, share scientific and technological information, and otherwise communicate across national boundaries. The efforts of English-speaking Christian missionaries have resulted in English becoming a second language for many other groups.

Global variation among different English dialects and accents remains significant today.

== Proto-English ==
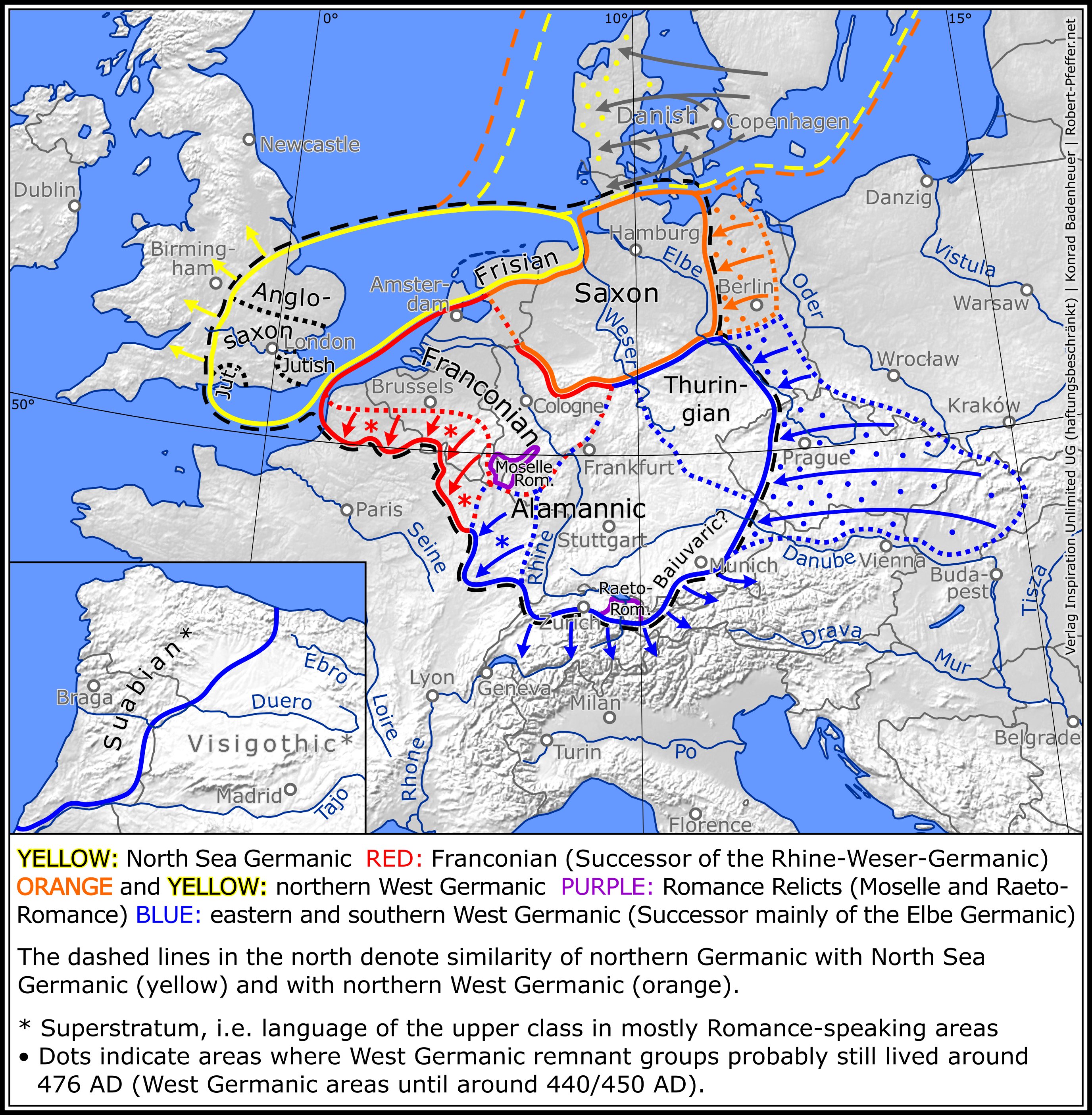
Proto-English (early Anglo-Saxon) and the West Germanic languages c. 476 AD.

English has its roots in the languages of the Germanic peoples of northern Europe. During the Roman Empire, most of the Germanic-inhabited area, Germania, remained independent from Rome, although some southwestern parts were within the empire. Some Germans served in the Roman military, and troops from Germanic tribes such as the Tungri, Batavi, Menapii and Frisii served in Britain (Britannia) under Roman command. Germanic settlement and power expanded during the Migration Period, which saw the fall of the Western Roman Empire. A Germanic settlement of Britain took place from the 5th to the 7th century, following the end of Roman rule on the island.

The Anglo-Saxon Chronicle relates that around the year 449 Vortigern, king of the Britons, invited the "Angle kin", Angles allegedly led by the Germanic brothers Hengist and Horsa, to help repel invading Picts, in return for lands in the southeast of Britain. This led to waves of settlers who eventually established seven kingdoms, known as the heptarchy. The Chronicle was not a contemporaneous work, however, and cannot be regarded as an accurate record of such early events. Bede, who wrote his Ecclesiastical History in AD 731, writes of invasion by Angles, Saxons and Jutes, although the precise nature of the invasion and settlement and the contributions made by these particular groups are the subject of much dispute among historians.

The languages spoken by the Germanic peoples who initially settled in Britain were part of the West Germanic branch of the Germanic language family. They consisted of dialects from the Ingvaeonic grouping, spoken mainly around the North Sea coast, in regions that lie within modern Denmark, north-west Germany and the Netherlands. Due to specific similarities between early English and Old Frisian, an Anglo-Frisian grouping is also identified, although it does not necessarily represent a node in the family tree.

These dialects had most of the typical West Germanic features, including a significant amount of grammatical inflection. Vocabulary came largely from the core Germanic stock, although due to the Germanic peoples' extensive contacts with the Roman world, the settlers' languages already included a number of loanwords from Latin. For instance, the predecessor of Modern English wine had been borrowed into early Germanic from the Latin vinum.

== Old English ==
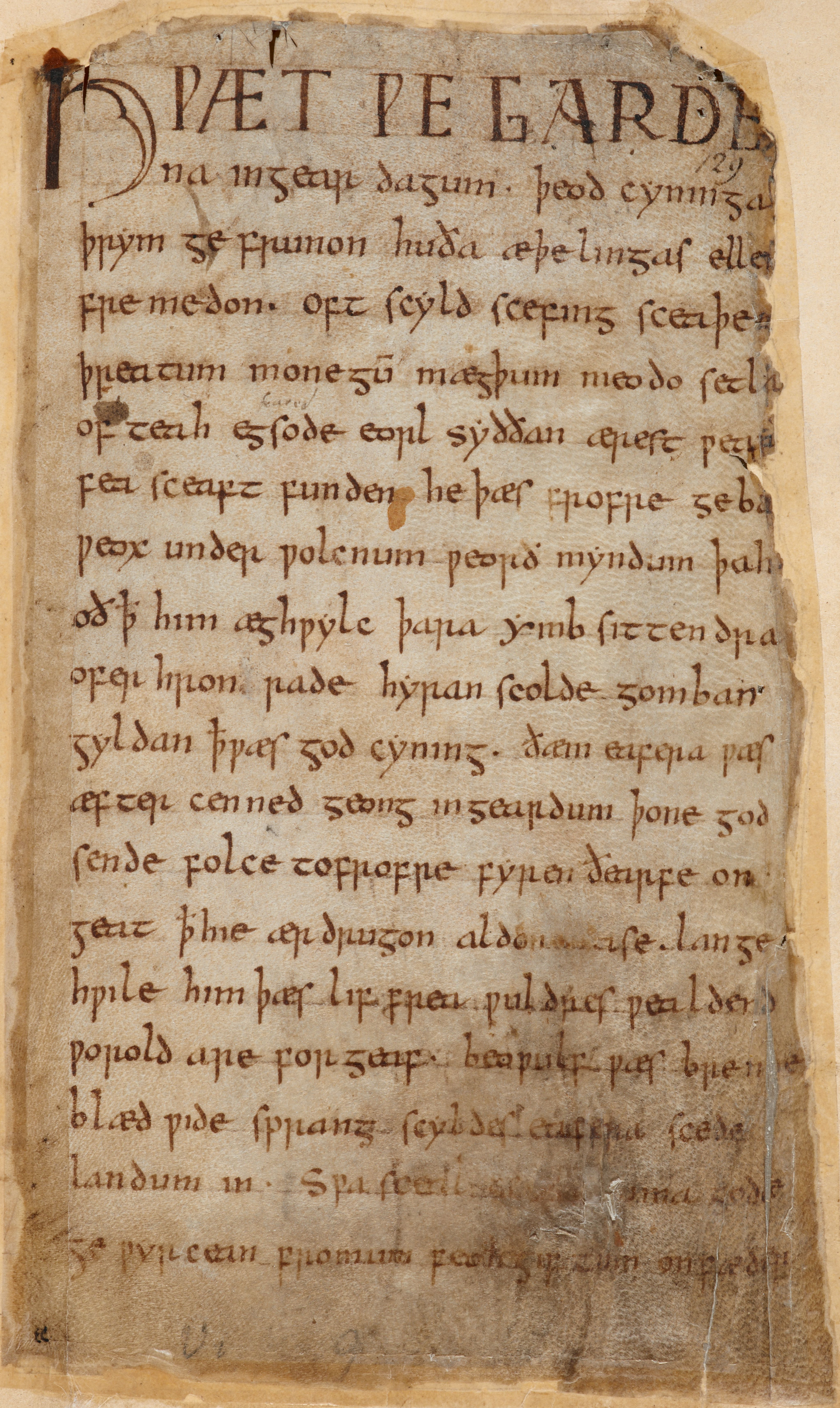
The first page of the Beowulf manuscript, now in the British Library

The Germanic settlers in the British Isles initially spoke several different dialects, which developed into a language that came to be called Anglo-Saxon. It displaced the indigenous Brittonic Celtic, and the Latin of the former Roman rulers, in parts of the areas of Britain that later formed the Kingdom of England. Celtic languages remained in most of Scotland, Wales and Cornwall, and many compound Celtic-Germanic place names survive, hinting at early language mixing. Old English continued to exhibit local variation, the remnants of which continue to be found in dialects of Modern English. The four main dialects were Mercian, Northumbrian, Kentish and West Saxon. West Saxon formed the basis for the literary standard of the later Old English period. The dominant forms of Middle and Modern English developed mainly from Mercian.

Old English was first written using a runic script called the futhorc. This was replaced by a version of the Latin alphabet introduced by Irish missionaries in the 8th century. Most literary output was in either the Early West Saxon of Alfred the Great's time, or the Late West Saxon, regarded as the "classical" form of Old English, of the Winchester school, inspired by Bishop Æthelwold of Winchester, and followed by such writers as the prolific Ælfric of Eynsham, "the Grammarian". The most famous surviving work from the Old English period is the epic poem Beowulf, composed by an unknown poet.

The introduction of Christianity from around the year 600 encouraged the addition of over 400 Latin loan words into Old English, such as the predecessors of the modern priest, paper, and school, and a smaller number of Greek loan words. The speech of eastern and northern parts of England was also subject to strong Old Norse influence due to Scandinavian rule and settlement beginning in the 9th century (see below).

Most native English speakers today find Old English unintelligible, even though about half of the most commonly used words in Modern English have Old English roots. The grammar of Old English was much more inflected than modern English, combined with freer word order, and was grammatically quite similar in some respects to modern German. The language had demonstrative pronouns, equivalent to this and that, but did not have the definite article the. The Old English period is considered to have evolved into the Middle English period some time after the Norman Conquest of 1066, when the language came to be influenced significantly by the new ruling class's language, Old Norman.

=== Scandinavian influence ===
The approximate extent of Old Norse and related languages in the early 10th century: Old West Norse dialect Old East Norse dialect Old Gutnish dialect Old English Crimean Gothic Other Germanic languages with which Old Norse still retained some mutual intelligibility

Vikings from modern-day Norway and Denmark began to raid parts of Britain from the late 8th century onward. In 865, a major invasion was launched by what the Anglo-Saxons called the Great Heathen Army, which eventually brought large parts of northern and eastern England, the Danelaw, under Scandinavian control. Most of these areas were retaken by the English under Edward the Elder in the early 10th century, although York and Northumbria were not permanently regained until the death of Eric Bloodaxe in 954. Scandinavian raids resumed in the late 10th century during the reign of Æthelred the Unready. Sweyn Forkbeard was briefly declared king of England in 1013, followed by the longer reign of his son Cnut from 1016 to 1035, and Cnut's sons Harold Harefoot and Harthacnut, until 1042.

The Scandinavians, or Norsemen, spoke dialects of a North Germanic language known as Old Norse. The Anglo-Saxons and the Scandinavians thus spoke related languages from different branches (West and North) of the Germanic family. Many of their lexical roots were the same or similar, although their grammatical systems were more divergent. It is likely that significant numbers of Norse speakers settled in the Danelaw during the period of Scandinavian control. Many place-names in those areas are of Scandinavian provenance, those ending in -by, for example. It is believed that the settlers often established new communities in places that had not previously been developed by the Anglo-Saxons. The extensive contact between Old English and Old Norse speakers, including the possibility of intermarriage that resulted from the acceptance of Christianity by the Danes in 878, undoubtedly influenced the varieties of those languages spoken in the areas of contact.

During the rule of Cnut and other Danish kings in the first half of the 11th century, a kind of diglossia may have come about, with the West Saxon literary language existing alongside the Norse-influenced Midland dialect of English, which could have served as a koine or spoken lingua franca. When Danish rule ended, and particularly after the Norman Conquest, the status of the minority Norse language presumably declined relative to that of English, and its remaining speakers assimilated to English in a process involving language shift and language death. The widespread bilingualism that must have existed during the process possibly contributed to the rate of borrowings from Norse into English.

Only about 100 or 150 Norse words, mainly connected with government and administration, are found in Old English writing. The borrowing of words of this type was stimulated by Scandinavian rule in the Danelaw and during the later reign of Cnut. Most surviving Old English texts are based on the West Saxon standard that developed outside the Danelaw. It is not clear to what extent Norse influenced the forms of the language spoken in eastern and northern England at that time. Later texts from the Middle English era, now based on an eastern Midland rather than a Wessex standard, reflect the significant impact that Norse had on the language. In all, English borrowed about 2,000 words from Old Norse, several hundred surviving in Modern English.

Norse borrowings include many very common words, such as anger, bag, both, hit, law, leg, same, skill, sky, take, window, and even the pronoun they. Norse influence is also believed to have reinforced the adoption of the plural copular verb form are rather, than alternative Old English forms like sind. It is considered to have stimulated and accelerated the morphological simplification found in Middle English, such as the loss of grammatical gender and explicitly marked case, except in pronouns. That is possibly confirmed by observations that simplification of the case endings occurred earliest in the north, and latest in the southwest. The spread of phrasal verbs in English is another grammatical development to which Norse may have contributed, although here a possible Celtic influence is also noted.

Some scholars have claimed that Old English died out entirely and was replaced by Norse towards the end of the Old English period and as part of the transition to Middle English, by virtue of the Middle English syntax being much more akin to Norse than Old English. Other scholars reject this claim.

== Middle English ==
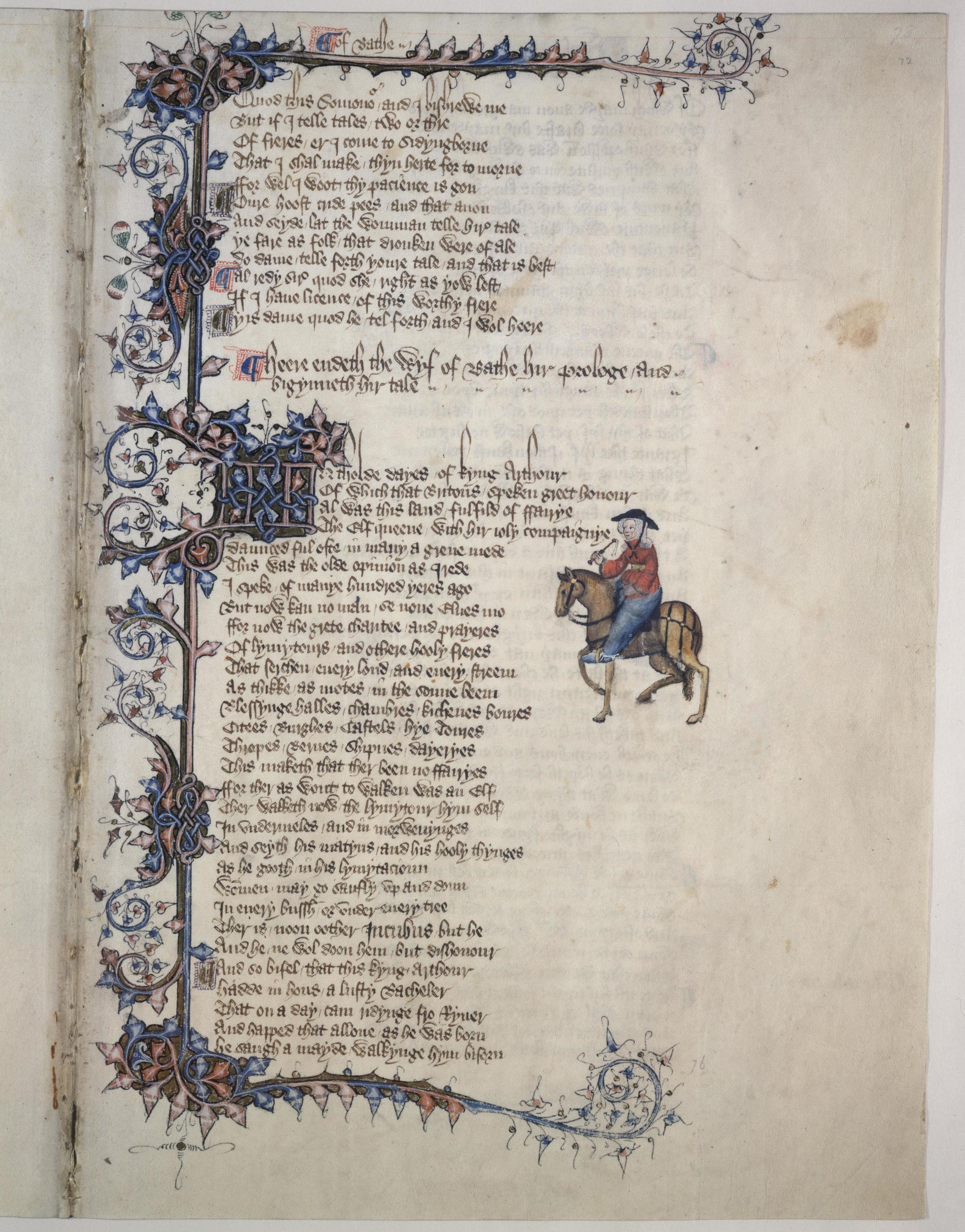
The opening prologue of "The Wife of Bath's Tale" from The Canterbury Tales

Middle English is the forms of English spoken roughly from the time of the Norman Conquest in 1066 until the end of the 15th century.

For centuries after the Conquest, the Norman kings and high-ranking nobles in England and to some extent elsewhere in the British Isles spoke Anglo-Norman, a variety of Old Norman, originating from a northern langue d'oïl dialect. Merchants and lower-ranked nobles were often bilingual in Anglo-Norman and English, whilst English continued to be the language of the common people. Middle English was influenced by both Anglo-Norman, and later Anglo-French. See characteristics of the Anglo-Norman language.

The percentage of modern English words derived from each language group: Anglo-Norman French, then French: ~29% Latin, including words used only in scientific, medical or legal contexts: ~29% Germanic: ~26% Others: ~16%

Until the 14th century, Anglo-Norman and then French were the language of the courts and government. Even after the decline of Norman, standard French retained the status of a formal or prestige language. About 10,000 French and Norman loan words entered Middle English, particularly terms associated with government, church, law, the military, fashion, and food. See English language word origins and List of English words of French origin.

Although English is a Germanic language, it has a deep connection to Romance languages. The roots of this connection trace back to the Conquest of England by the Normans in 1066. The Normans spoke a dialect of Old French, and the commingling of Norman French and Old English resulted in Middle English, a language that reflects aspects of both Germanic and Romance languages and evolved into the English we speak today, where nearly 60% of the words are from Latin & Romance languages like French.

The strong influence of Old Norse on English becomes apparent during this period. The impact of the native British Celtic languages that English continued to displace is generally held to be very small, although a few scholars have attributed some grammatical forms, such as periphrastic "do", to Celtic influence. These theories have been criticized by a number of other linguists. Some scholars have also put forward hypotheses that Middle English was a kind of creole language resulting from contact between Old English and either Old Norse or Anglo-Norman.

English literature began to reappear after 1200, when a changing political climate and the decline in Anglo-Norman made it more respectable. The Provisions of Oxford, released in 1258, was the first English government document to be published in the English language after the Norman Conquest. In 1362, Edward III became the first king to address Parliament in English. The Pleading in English Act 1362 made English the only language in which court proceedings could be held, though the official record remained in Latin. By the end of the century, the royal court had switched to English. Anglo-Norman remained in use in limited circles somewhat longer, but it had ceased to be a living language. Official documents began to be produced regularly in English during the 15th century. Geoffrey Chaucer, who lived in the late 14th century, is the most famous writer from the Middle English period, and The Canterbury Tales is his best-known work.

The English language changed enormously during the Middle English period, in vocabulary, in pronunciation, and in grammar. While Old English is a heavily inflected language (synthetic), the use of grammatical endings diminished in Middle English (analytic). Grammar distinctions were lost as many noun and adjective endings were levelled to -e. The older plural noun marker -en, retained in a few cases such as children and oxen, largely gave way to -s. Grammatical gender was discarded. Definite article þe appears around 1200, later spelled as the, first appearing in East and North England as a substitute for Old English se and seo, nominative forms of "that."

English spelling was also influenced by Norman in this period, with the /θ/ and /ð/ sounds being spelled th, rather than with the Old English letters þ (thorn) and ð (eth), which did not exist in Norman. These letters remain in the modern Icelandic and Faroese alphabets, having been borrowed from Old English via Old West Norse.

== Early Modern English ==
English underwent extensive sound changes during the 15th century, while its spelling conventions remained largely constant. Modern English is often dated from the Great Vowel Shift, which took place mainly during the 15th century. The language was further transformed by the spread of a standardized London-based dialect in government and administration and by the standardizing effect of printing, which also tended to regularize capitalization. As a result, the language acquired self-conscious terms such as "accent" and "dialect". As most early presses came from continental Europe, a few native English letters such as þ and ð died out. For some time þe (modern "the") was written as ye. By the time of William Shakespeare (mid 16th – early 17th century), the language had become clearly recognizable as Modern English. In 1604, the first English dictionary was published, A Table Alphabeticall.

Increased literacy and travel facilitated the adoption of many foreign words, especially borrowings from Latin and Greek, often terms for abstract concepts not available in English. In the 17th century, Latin words were often used with their original inflections, but these eventually disappeared. As there are many words from different languages and English spelling is variable, the risk of mispronunciation is high, but remnants of the older forms remain in a few regional dialects, most notably in the West Country. During the period, loan words were borrowed from Italian, German, and Yiddish. British acceptance of and resistance to Americanisms began during this period.

== Modern English ==
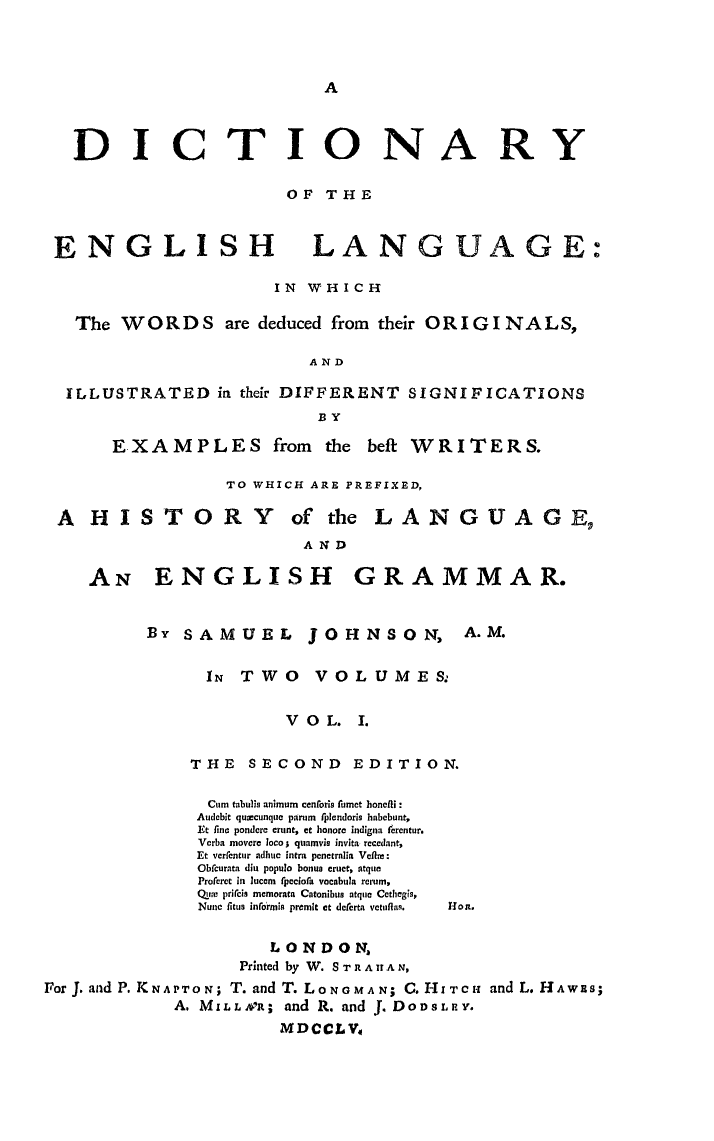
The title page from the second edition of the first Dictionary of the English Language, 1755

The first authoritative and full-featured English dictionary, the Dictionary of the English Language, was published by Samuel Johnson in 1755. To a high degree, the dictionary standardized both English spelling and word usage. Meanwhile, grammar texts by Lowth, Murray, Priestly, and others attempted to prescribe standard usage even further.

Early Modern English and Late Modern English, also called Present-Day English (PDE), differ essentially in vocabulary. Late Modern English has many more words, arising from the Industrial Revolution and technologies that created a need for new words, as well as international development of the language. The British Empire at its height covered one quarter of the Earth's land surface, and the English language adopted foreign words from many countries. British English and North American English, the two major varieties of the language, are together spoken by 400 million people. The total number of English speakers worldwide may exceed one billion. There have been attempts to predict future English evolution, though they have been met with skepticism.

== Phonological changes ==
=== Introduction ===
Over the last 1,200 years or so, English has undergone extensive changes in its vowel system, but many fewer changes to its consonants.

In the Old English period, a number of umlaut processes affected vowels in complex ways. Unstressed vowels were gradually eroded, eventually leading to a loss of grammatical case and grammatical gender in the Early Middle English period. The most important umlaut process was *i-mutation, which led to pervasive alternations of all sorts, many of which survive in the modern language: e.g. in noun paradigms (foot vs. feet, mouse vs. mice, brother vs. brethren); in verb paradigms (sold vs. sell); nominal derivatives from adjectives ("strong" vs. "strength", broad vs. breadth, foul vs. filth) and from other nouns (fox vs. "vixen"); verbal derivatives ("food" vs. "to feed"); and comparative adjectives ("old" vs. "elder"). Consonants were more stable, although velar consonants were significantly modified by palatalization, which produced alternations such as speak vs. speech, drink vs. drench, wake vs. watch, bake vs. batch.

The Middle English period saw further vowel changes. Most significant was the Great Vowel Shift, c. 1500 CE, which transformed the pronunciation of all long vowels. This occurred after the spelling system was fixed, and accounts for the drastic differences in pronunciation between "short" mat, met, bit, cot vs. "long" mate, mete/meet, bite, coat. Other changes that left echoes in the modern language were homorganic lengthening before ld, mb, nd, which accounts for the long vowels in child, mind, climb, etc.; pre-cluster shortening, which resulted in the vowel alternations in child vs. children, keep vs. kept, meet vs. met; and trisyllabic laxing, which is responsible for alternations such as grateful vs. gratitude, divine vs. divinity, sole vs. solitary.

Among the more significant recent changes to the language have been the development of rhotic and non-rhotic accents (i.e. "r-dropping") and the trap-bath split in many dialects of British English.

=== Vowel changes ===
The following table shows the principal developments in the stressed vowels, from Old English through Modern English. C indicates any consonant:

Old English (c. 900 AD)	Middle English (c. 1400 AD)	Early Modern English (c. 1600 AD)	Modern English	Modern spelling	Examples
ɑː	ɔː	oː	oʊ əʊ (UK)	oa, oCe	oak, boat, whole, stone
æː, æːɑ	ɛː	eː	iː	ea	heal, beat, cheap
eː, eːo	eː	iː	iː	ee, -e	feed, deep, me, be
iː, yː	iː	əi or ɛi	aɪ	iCe	ride, time, mice
oː	oː	uː	uː	oo, -o	moon, food, do
uː	uː	əu or ɔu	aʊ	ou	mouse, out, loud
ɑ, æ, æɑ	a	æ	æ	a	man, sat, wax
ɑ, æ, æɑ	aː	ɛː	eɪ	aCe	name, bake, raven
e, eo	e	ɛ	ɛ	e	help, tell, seven
e, eo	ɛː	eː	iː	ea, eCe	speak, meat, mete
i, y	ɪ	ɪ	ɪ	i	written, sit, kiss
o	o	ɔ	ɒ ɑ (US)	o	god, top, beyond
o	ɔː	oː	oʊ əʊ (UK)	oa, oCe	foal, nose, over
u	ʊ	ɤ	ʌ	u, o	buck, up, love, wonder
u	ʊ	ʊ	ʊ	u, o	full, bull

The following chart shows the primary developments of English vowels in the last 600 years, in more detail, since Late Middle English of Chaucer's time. The Great Vowel Shift can be seen in the dramatic developments from c. 1400 to 1600.

Neither of the above tables covers the history of Middle English diphthongs, the changes before /r/, or various special cases and exceptions. For details, see phonological history of English as well as the articles on Old English phonology and Middle English phonology.

=== Examples ===
The vowel changes over time can be seen in the following example words, showing the changes in their form over the last 2,000 years:

	one	two	three	four	five	six	seven	mother	heart	hear
Proto-Germanic, c. AD 1	ainaz	twai	θriːz	feðwoːr	fimf	sehs	seβun	moːðeːr	hertoːː	hauzijanã
West Germanic, c. AD 400	ain	twai	θriju	fewwur	fimf	sehs	seβun	moːdar	herta	haurijan
Late Old English, c. AD 900	aːn	twaː	θreo	feowor	fiːf	siks	sĕŏvon	moːdor	hĕŏrte	heːran, hyːran
(Late Old English spelling)	(ān)	(twā)	(þrēo)	(fēowor)	(fīf)	(six)	(seofon)	(mōdor)	(heorte)	(hēran, hȳran)
Late Middle English, c. 1350	ɔːn	twoː	θreː	fowər	fiːvə	siks	sevən	moːðər	hertə	hɛːrə(n)
(Late Middle English spelling)	(oon)	(two)	(three)	(fower)	(five)	(six)	(seven)	(mother)	(herte)	(heere(n))
Early Modern English, c. 1600	oːn >! wʊn	twuː > tuː	θriː	foːr	fəiv	siks	sevən	mʊðər	hert	heːr
Modern English, c. 2000	wʌn	tuː	θriː	fɔː(r)	faiv	sɪks	sevən	mʌðə(r)	hɑrt/hɑːt	hiːr/hiə
	one	two	three	four	five	six	seven	mother	heart	hear

== Grammatical changes ==
The English language once had an extensive declension system similar to Latin, Greek, modern German and Icelandic. Old English distinguished among the nominative, accusative, dative, and genitive cases, and for strongly declined adjectives and some pronouns also a separate instrumental case (which otherwise and later completely coincided with the dative). The dual number was distinguished from the singular and plural. Declension was greatly simplified during the Middle English period, when the accusative and dative cases of the pronouns merged into a single oblique case, that also replaced the genitive case after prepositions. Nouns in Modern English no longer decline for case, except for the genitive.

=== Evolution of English pronouns ===
Pronouns such as whom and him, contrasted with who and he, are a conflation of the old accusative and dative cases, as well as of the genitive case after prepositions, while her also includes the genitive case. This conflated form is called the oblique case or the object (objective) case, because it is used for objects of verbs (direct, indirect, or oblique) as well as for objects of prepositions. See object pronoun. The information formerly conveyed by distinct case forms is now mostly provided by prepositions and word order. In Old English, as well as modern German and Icelandic as further examples, these cases have distinct forms.

Although some grammarians continue to use the traditional terms "accusative" and "dative", these are functions rather than morphological cases in Modern English. That is, the form whom may play accusative or dative roles, as well as instrumental or prepositional roles, but it is a single morphological form, contrasting with nominative who and genitive whose. Many grammarians use the labels "subjective", "objective", and "possessive" for nominative, oblique, and genitive pronouns.

Modern English nouns exhibit only one inflection of the reference form: the possessive case, which some linguists argue is not a case at all, but a clitic. See the entry for genitive case for more information.

==== Interrogative pronouns ====
	Case	Old English	Middle English	Modern English
Masculine, feminine (person)	Nominative	hwā	who	who
Masculine, feminine (person)	Accusative	hwone, hwæne	whom	whom, who^{1}
Masculine, feminine (person)	Dative	hwām, hwǣm	whom	whom, who^{1}
Masculine, feminine (person)	Instrumental			
Masculine, feminine (person)	Genitive	hwæs	whos	whose
Neuter (thing)	Nominative	hwæt	what	what
Neuter (thing)	Accusative	hwæt	what, whom	what
Neuter (thing)	Dative	hwām, hwǣm	what, whom	what
Neuter (thing)	Instrumental	hwȳ, hwon	why	why^{2}
Neuter (thing)	Genitive	hwæs	whos	whose^{3}

^{1} – In some dialects "who" is used where formal English only allows "whom", though variation among dialects must be taken into account.

^{2} – An explanation may be found in the last paragraph of this section of Instrumental case.

^{3} – Usually replaced by of what (postpositioned).

==== First person personal pronouns ====
	Case	Old English	Middle English	Modern English
Singular	Nominative	iċ	I, ich, ik	I
Singular	Accusative	mē, meċ	me	me
Singular	Dative	mē	me	me
Singular	Genitive	mīn	min, mi	my, mine
Plural	Nominative	wē	we	we^{1}
Plural	Accusative	ūs, ūsiċ	us	us
Plural	Dative	ūs	us	us
Plural	Genitive	ūser, ūre	ure, our	our, ours

^{1} – Old English also had a separate dual, wit ("we two") et cetera; however, no later forms derive from it.

==== Second person personal pronouns ====
Old and Middle English singular to the Modern English archaic informal
	Case	Old English	Middle English	Modern English
Singular	Nominative	þū	þu, thou	thou (you)
Singular	Accusative	þē, þeċ	þé, thee	thee (you)
Singular	Dative	þē	þé, thee	thee (you)
Singular	Genitive	þīn	þi, þīn, þīne, thy; thin, thine	thy, thine (your, yours)
Plural	Nominative	ġē	ye, ȝe, you	you^{1}
Plural	Accusative	ēow, ēowiċ	you, ya	you^{1}
Plural	Dative	ēow	you, ya	you^{1}
Plural	Genitive	ēower	your	your, yours

^{1} – Note that the ye/you distinction still existed, at least optionally, in Early Modern English: "Ye shall know the truth and the truth shall make you free" from the King James Bible.

Here the letter þ (interchangeable with ð in manuscripts) corresponds to th. For ȝ, see Yogh.

Formal and informal forms of the second person singular and plural
	Old English				Middle English				Modern English			
	Singular		Plural		Singular		Plural		Singular		Plural	
Case	Formal	Informal	Formal	Informal	Formal	Informal	Formal	Informal	Formal	Informal	Formal	Informal
Nominative	þū		ġē^{1}		you	thou	you	ye	you			
Accusative	þē, þeċ		ēow, ēowiċ		you	thee	you	you	you			
Dative	þē		ēow		you	thee	you	you	you			
Genitive	þīn		ēower		your, yours	thy, thine	your, yours		you	your, yours		

^{1} – (Old English also had a separate dual, ġit ("ye two") etcetera; however, no later forms derive from it.)

==== Third person personal pronouns ====
	Case	Old English	Middle English	Modern English
Masculine singular	Nominative	hē	he	he
Masculine singular	Accusative	hine	him	him
Masculine singular	Dative	him	him	him
Masculine singular	Genitive	his	his	his
Feminine singular	Nominative	hēo	heo, sche, ho, he, ȝho	she
Feminine singular	Accusative	hīe	hire, hure, her, heore	her
Feminine singular	Dative	hire	hire, hure, her, heore	her
Feminine singular	Genitive	hire	hir, hire, heore, her, here	her, hers
Neuter singular	Nominative	hit	hit, it	it, they
Neuter singular	Accusative	hit	hit, it, him	it, them
Neuter singular	Dative	him	hit, it, him	it, them
Neuter singular	Genitive	his	his	its, their
Plural^{1}	Nominative	hīe	he, hi, ho, hie, þai, þei	they
Plural^{1}	Accusative	hīe	hem, ham, heom, þaim, þem, þam	them
Plural^{1}	Dative	him	hem, ham, heom, þaim, þem, þam	them
Plural^{1}	Genitive	hira	here, heore, hore, þair, þar	their, theirs

^{1} – The origin of the modern forms is generally thought to have been a borrowing from Old Norse forms þæir, þæim, þæira. The two different roots co-existed for some time, although currently the only common remnant is the shortened form 'em. Cf. also the demonstrative pronouns.

== Examples ==
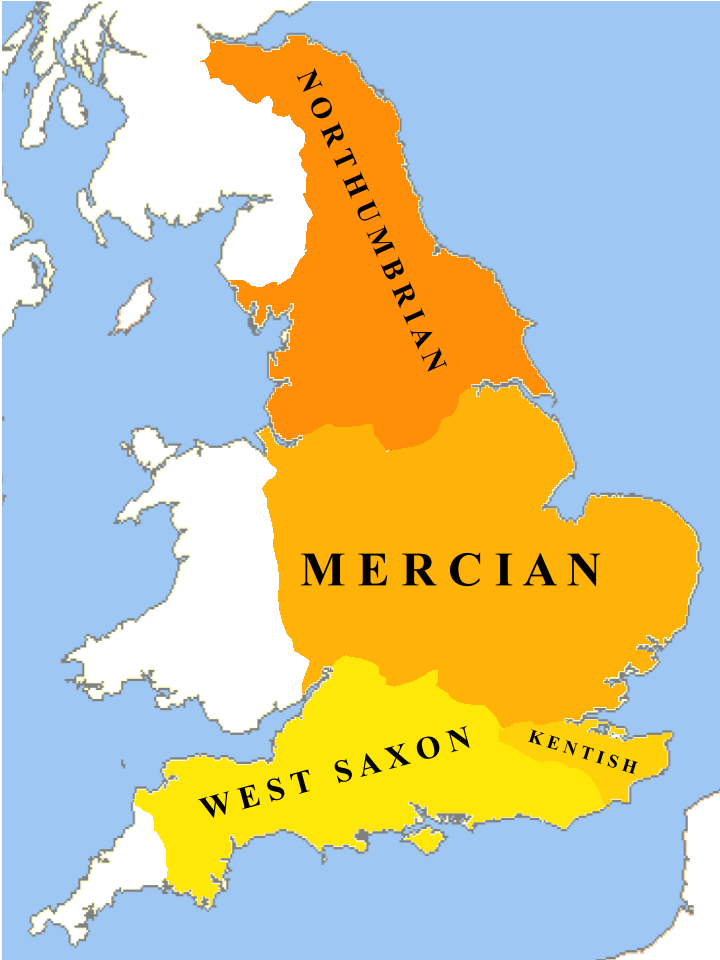
The dialects of Old English c. 800 CE

=== Beowulf ===
Beowulf is an Old English epic poem in alliterative verse. It is dated from the 8th to the early 11th centuries. These are the first 11 lines:

Hwæt! Wē Gār-Dena	in geārdagum,
þēodcyninga	þrym gefrūnon,
hū ðā æþelingas	ellen fremedon.
Oft Scyld Scēfing	sceaþena þrēatum,
monegum mǣgþum,	meodosetla oftēah,
egsode eorlas.	Syððan ǣrest wearð
fēasceaft funden,	hē þæs frōfre gebād,
wēox under wolcnum,	weorðmyndum þāh,
oðþæt him ǣghwylc	þāra ymbsittendra
ofer hronrāde	hȳran scolde,
gomban gyldan.	Þæt wæs gōd cyning!

Which, as translated by Francis Barton Gummere, reads:

Lo, praise of the prowess of people-kings
of spear-armed Danes, in days long sped,
we have heard, and what honor the athelings won!
Oft Scyld the Scefing from squadroned foes,
from many a tribe, the mead-bench tore,
awing the earls. Since erst he lay
friendless, a foundling, fate repaid him:
for he waxed under welkin, in wealth he throve,
till before him the folk, both far and near,
who house by the whale-path, heard his mandate,
gave him gifts: a good king he!

=== Voyages of Ohthere and Wulfstan ===
This is the beginning of The Voyages of Ohthere and Wulfstan, a prose text in Old English dated to the late 9th century. The full text can be found at Wikisource.

Original:

Ōhthere sǣde his hlāforde, Ælfrēde cyninge, ðæt hē ealra Norðmonna norþmest būde. Hē cwæð þæt hē būde on þǣm lande norþweardum wiþ þā Westsǣ. Hē sǣde þēah þæt þæt land sīe swīþe lang norþ þonan; ac hit is eal wēste, būton on fēawum stōwum styccemǣlum wīciað Finnas, on huntoðe on wintra, ond on sumera on fiscaþe be þǣre sǣ. Hē sǣde þæt hē æt sumum cirre wolde fandian hū longe þæt land norþryhte lǣge, oþþe hwæðer ǣnig mon be norðan þǣm wēstenne būde. Þā fōr hē norþryhte be þǣm lande: lēt him ealne weg þæt wēste land on ðæt stēorbord, ond þā wīdsǣ on ðæt bæcbord þrīe dagas. Þā wæs hē swā feor norþ swā þā hwælhuntan firrest faraþ. Þā fōr hē þā giet norþryhte swā feor swā hē meahte on þǣm ōþrum þrīm dagum gesiglau. Þā bēag þæt land, þǣr ēastryhte, oþþe sēo sǣ in on ðæt lond, hē nysse hwæðer, būton hē wisse ðæt hē ðǣr bād westanwindes ond hwōn norþan, ond siglde ðā ēast be lande swā swā hē meahte on fēower dagum gesiglan. Þā sceolde hē ðǣr bīdan ryhtnorþanwindes, for ðǣm þæt land bēag þǣr sūþryhte, oþþe sēo sǣ in on ðæt land, hē nysse hwæþer. Þā siglde hē þonan sūðryhte be lande swā swā hē meahte on fīf dagum gesiglan. Ðā læg þǣr ān micel ēa ūp on þæt land. Ðā cirdon hīe ūp in on ðā ēa for þǣm hīe ne dorston forþ bī þǣre ēa siglan for unfriþe; for þǣm ðæt land wæs eall gebūn on ōþre healfe þǣre ēas. Ne mētte hē ǣr nān gebūn land, siþþan hē from his āgnum hām fōr; ac him wæs ealne weg wēste land on þæt stēorbord, būtan fiscerum ond fugelerum ond huntum, ond þæt wǣron eall Finnas; ond him wæs āwīdsǣ on þæt bæcbord. Þā Boermas heafdon sīþe wel gebūd hira land: ac hīe ne dorston þǣr on cuman. Ac þāra Terfinna land wæs eal wēste, būton ðǣr huntan gewīcodon, oþþe fisceras, oþþe fugeleras.

A translation:

Ohthere said to his lord, King Alfred, that he of all Norsemen lived north-most. He quoth that he lived in the land northward along the West Sea. He said though that the land was very long from there, but it is all wasteland, except that in a few places here and there Finns [i.e. Sami] encamp, hunting in winter and in summer fishing by the sea. He said that at some time he wanted to find out how long the land lay northward or whether any man lived north of the wasteland. Then he traveled north by the land. All the way he kept the waste land on his starboard and the wide sea on his port three days. Then he was as far north as whale hunters furthest travel. Then he traveled still north as far as he might sail in another three days. Then the land bowed east (or the sea into the land — he did not know which). But he knew that he waited there for west winds (and somewhat north), and sailed east by the land so as he might sail in four days. Then he had to wait for due-north winds, because the land bowed south (or the sea into the land — he did not know which). Then he sailed from there south by the land so as he might sail in five days. Then a large river lay there up into the land. Then they turned up into the river, because they dared not sail forth past the river for hostility, because the land was all settled on the other side of the river. He had not encountered earlier any settled land since he travelled from his own home, but all the way waste land was on his starboard (except fishers, fowlers and hunters, who were all Finns). And the wide sea was always on his port. The Bjarmians have cultivated their land very well, but they did not dare go in there. But the Terfinn's land was all waste except where hunters encamped, or fishers or fowlers.

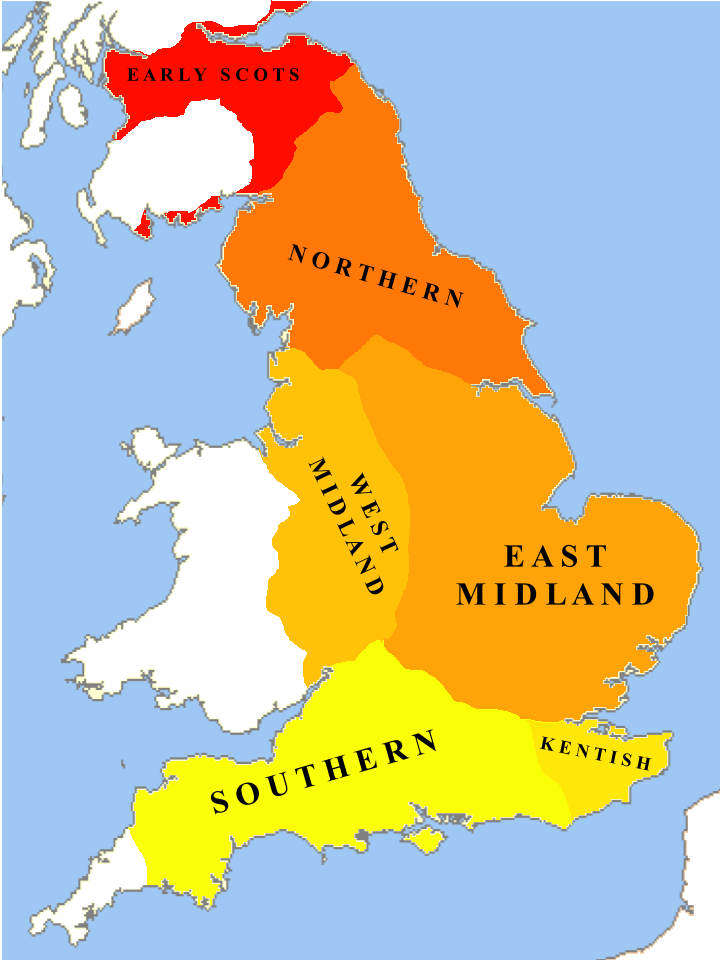
The dialects of Middle English c. 1300

=== Ayenbite of Inwyt ===
From Ayenbite of Inwyt ("the prick of conscience"), a translation of a French confessional prose work into the Kentish dialect of Middle English, completed in 1340:

Nou ich wille þet ye ywite hou hit is ywent
þet þis boc is ywrite mid Engliss of Kent.
Þis boc is ymad vor lewede men
Vor vader and vor moder and vor oþer ken
ham vor to berȝe vram alle manyere zen
þet ine hare inwytte ne bleve no voul wen.
'Huo ase god' in his name yzed,
Þet þis boc made god him yeve þet bread,
Of angles of hevene, and þerto his red,
And ondervonge his zaule huanne þet he is dyad. Amen.

=== The Canterbury Tales ===
The beginning of The Canterbury Tales, a collection of stories in poetry and prose written in the London dialect of Middle English by Geoffrey Chaucer, at the end of the 14th century:

Whan that Aprill with his shoures soote
The droghte of March hath perced to the roote,
And bathed every veyne in swich licour
Of which vertu engendred is the flour;
Whan Zephirus eek with his sweete breeth
Inspired hath in every holt and heeth
The tendre croppes, and the yonge sonne
Hath in the Ram his half cours yronne,
And smale foweles maken melodye,
That slepen al the nyght with open yë
(So priketh hem nature in hir corages),
Thanne longen folk to goon on pilgrimages,
And palmeres for to seken straunge strondes,
To ferne halwes, kowthe in sondry londes;
And specially from every shires ende
Of Engelond to Caunterbury they wende,
The hooly blisful martir for to seke,
That hem hath holpen whan that they were seeke.

=== Paradise Lost ===
The beginning of Paradise Lost, an epic poem in unrhymed iambic pentameter written in Early Modern English by John Milton, first published in 1667:

Of Mans First Disobedience, and the Fruit
Of that Forbidden Tree, whose mortal tast
Brought Death into the World, and all our woe,
With loss of Eden, till one greater Man
Restore us, and regain the blissful Seat,
Sing Heav'nly Muse, that on the secret top
Of Oreb, or of Sinai, didst inspire
That Shepherd, who first taught the chosen Seed,
In the Beginning how the Heav'ns and Earth
Rose out of Chaos: Or if Sion Hill
Delight thee more, and Siloa's Brook that flow'd
Fast by the Oracle of God; I thence
Invoke thy aid to my adventrous Song,
That with no middle flight intends to soar
Above th' Aonian Mount, while it pursues
Things unattempted yet in Prose or Rhime.

=== Oliver Twist ===
A selection from the novel Oliver Twist, written by Charles Dickens in Modern English and published in 1838:

The evening arrived: the boys took their places; the master in his cook's uniform stationed himself at the copper; his pauper assistants ranged themselves behind him; the gruel was served out, and a long grace was said over the short commons. The gruel disappeared, the boys whispered each other and winked at Oliver, while his next neighbours nudged him. Child as he was, he was desperate with hunger and reckless with misery. He rose from the table, and advancing, basin and spoon in hand, to the master, said, somewhat alarmed at his own temerity—

"Please, sir, I want some more."

The master was a fat, healthy man, but he turned very pale. He gazed in stupefied astonishment on the small rebel for some seconds, and then clung for support to the copper. The assistants were paralysed with wonder, and the boys with fear.

"What!" said the master at length, in a faint voice.

"Please, sir," replied Oliver, "I want some more."

The master aimed a blow at Oliver's head with the ladle, pinioned him in his arms, and shrieked aloud for the beadle.

== See also ==
- Influence of French on English
- Phonological history of English
- Comparison of American and British English
- English phonology
- English studies
- Inkhorn debate
- Languages in the United Kingdom
- Middle English declension
- History of the Scots language
- Changes to Old English vocabulary
- Englishisation

Lists:

- List of dialects of the English language
- List of Germanic and Latinate equivalents
- Lists of English words of international origin
