= Joe Rayment =

Joe Rayment may refer to:

- Joe Rayment (footballer, born 1906) (1906–1969), English footballer
- Joe Rayment (footballer, born 1934) (1934–2019), his son, English footballer
