= Early English =

Early English may refer to:

- Early English Period, a style of architecture
- Old English, a stage in the development of the English language

== See also ==
- Early Modern English
- Middle English
- History of the English language
