= Middle English creole hypothesis =

Linguistic hypothesis on the origin of the English language

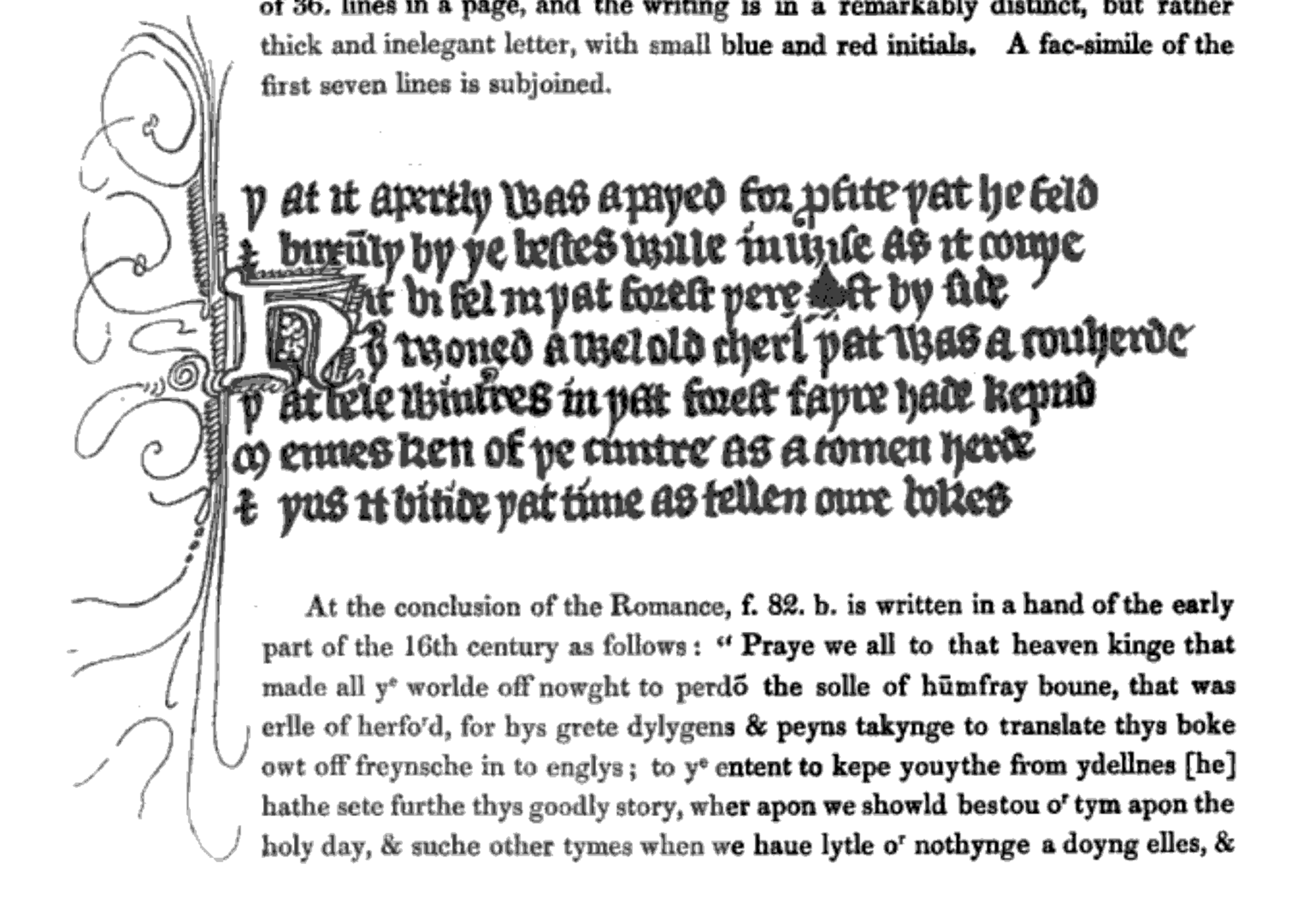
Text from William and the Werewolf (1350s/60s) with the manuscript letters transcribed into modern text.

The Middle English creole hypothesis is a proposal that Middle English was a creole, which is usually defined as a language that develops during contact between two groups speaking different languages and that loses much of the grammatical elaboration of its source languages in the process. The vast differences between Old English and Middle English, and English's status as one of the least structurally elaborated of the Germanic languages, have led some historical linguists to argue that the language underwent creolisation at around the 11th century, shortly after the Norman conquest of England. Other linguists suggest that creolisation began earlier, during the Scandinavian incursions of the 9th and 10th centuries.

Much of the debate over the Middle English creole hypothesis revolves around how terms like creole or creolisation should be defined. While there does not exist a consensus that Middle English should be classified as a creole, there does exist a consensus that Old English underwent fairly radical grammatical simplification in the process of evolving into Middle English, and that this evolution was due in large part to contact with speakers from other language groups.

== Middle English as an Anglo-Norman creole ==
Only an estimated 26% of English words are of Germanic origin. However, these include the core vocabulary and most commonly used words in the language.

This hypothesis was first proposed by C.-J. Bailey and K. Maroldt in 1977, followed by Nicole Domingue and Patricia Poussa. These authors argued that Middle English was a creole that developed when the Anglo-Norman-speaking invaders learned Old English imperfectly and expanded their reduced English into a full language. Evidence cited in support of the hypothesis was the heavy admixture of Norman words into the English lexicon, including some basic words such as the words for uncle, niece, danger, trouble, cause; the frequent loss of Old English verb and adjective affixes in favor of loans from Norman (e.g. enclosid, inpacient, disheritance); a number of grammatical changes that appear to have been modeled after Norman, such as expression of the perfect aspect using the verb have (as in "she has eaten"), the use of of to express the genitive (as in French le livre de Jean), and constructions such as "it is me", "it is him" (compare modern French c'est moi, c'est lui); and English's complete loss of case and gender markers on nouns.

== Defining creole and creolisation ==
Linguists' conception of what constitutes a creole has changed substantially in the years since Bailey & Maroldt's original proposal, and the question of whether Middle English is a French creole depends to some extent on how one defines the term creole.

Broadly speaking, two definitions of creole and creolisation are current in the linguistic literature:

1. A socio-historical, or diachronic, definition. According to this, creoles are natural languages that emerge when learners of a target language receive only fragmentary input from that language's native speakers as a result of social or psychological separation. In need of a full language nevertheless, they create one from this incomplete material, often in two stages: first a pidgin (by the adults), and later (perhaps by their children) a creole. A fundamental feature of this evolution is a reduction of overt grammatical apparatus due to the imperfect second-language learning by the adults; as a result, the creole is grammatically less elaborated than the target language. As C. Dalton-Puffer notes,
  It is indeed quite clear that there are historical facts which make it plausible to see Middle English in terms of a [French] Creole: certainly the initial stages of the Norman rule over England can be viewed as colonization and we know that pidgins and Creoles are post-colonial phenomena.
  However the scholarly consensus has largely turned away from the French creolisation hypothesis, for mostly socio-historical reasons:
  - During Norman rule, French speakers were probably too few in number, and too isolated from the general population, to affect the structure of a language that was spoken by millions.
  - Languages can borrow massive amounts of lexicon and morphology without necessarily being describable as creoles.
  - While an estimated 29% of modern English words come from the French (see figure), many of the most commonly used words (e.g. personal pronouns) remained Germanic in origin; in other words, the supposed substrate language (English) supplied the bulk of the vocabulary.
  - Perhaps most importantly, inflectional reduction was well under way in Old English before the eleventh century, even in dialects that were not in contact with French. For instance, phrasal verbs (give up, give in, etc.) appear to have replaced many of Old English's affixed verbs already by the time of the Norman invasion.
2. A structural, or synchronic, definition. Some authors have suggested that creole be defined in terms of a checklist of features, even with no knowledge of the language's sociohistory. Proposed checklist features include lack of gender distinctions or overtly marked passive voice; SVO word order; tense-modality-aspect systems that use exactly three preverbal particles; among others. Most, and possibly all, of these checklist features can sometimes be found in non-creole languages as well. John McWhorter, in a comprehensive survey of all known creoles, argued that the absence of only three features is sufficient to define a creole: little or no inflectional affixation (such as gender markings); a lack of functional tone marking, that is, tone that serves to distinguish lexical items (e.g. Mandarin Chinese mā 'mother' vs. mǎ 'horse'); and a lack of semantically opaque word formation, that is, a lack of words like understand or make up, the meanings of which are not analyzable in terms of the component meanings. McWhorter defined the term creole prototype to describe any language that lacked these three features, and argued that it would be natural for a language that underwent a significant break in transmission to have this character, although the language might re-acquire the features gradually over time.

Middle English comes reasonably close to satisfying the three criteria that define McWhorter's creole prototype. For instance, by the end of the twelfth century, grammatical gender was all but lost in northern English dialects, and two centuries later it had disappeared even in the south. However Middle English did not lose all of Old English's noncompositional derivational morphology; for instance, Old English understandan → Middle English understanden → English understand. Nevertheless, Middle English is highly simplified compared with Old English, suggesting, according to McWhorter, a contact-based explanation, though not necessarily contact with French:

Loss of inflection is but the tip of the iceberg in terms of Germanic features that English has shed, complemented by many other losses unconnected with analyticity. Overall, a comparison with its [Germanic] sisters reveals English to be significantly less overspecified semantically and less complexified syntactically. ... I argue that a contact-based, external explanation provides a principled account for the relevant facts.

== Scandinavian influence ==
While they emphasised the influence of French, both Bailey & Maroldt and Poussa also discussed the possibility that it was contact between Old English speakers and the invading Vikings during the ninth and tenth centuries, that was responsible for much of the loss of Germanic inheritance, followed only later by a Norman French influence. According to this scenario, Middle English would be more appropriately described as an Old Norse creole rather than a Norman French creole.

A number of arguments have been advanced in support of the hypothesis that Scandinavian contact profoundly influenced the course of English's evolution prior to the Norman invasion:

- Unlike the French elites, Scandinavians settled among the general population and often married Anglo-Saxon women.
- Lexical borrowing from Old Norse, while not as extensive as later borrowings from Norman French, included many domestic content words (happy, knife, skirt, window, neck) as well as commonly used words such as they, their, them, though, both, same, against.
- Loss of grammatical gender in English appears to have occurred first in the north and east, the regions of greatest Scandinavian settlement.
- The rapid loss of Old English verbal prefixes is attributed to the fact that Old Norse had already lost most of the Germanic prefixes, and so lacked cognates for English prefixed verbs.

McWhorter, in summarizing the evidence for Scandinavian influence, writes that "the evidence strongly suggests that extensive second-language acquisition by Scandinavians from the eighth century onwards simplified English grammar to a considerable extent". More specifically, the claim is that the inflectional and other losses in English resulted from Old Norse speakers' incomplete acquisition of English.

Creolisation of English might have occurred due to interaction between Common Brittonic and English, however evidence supporting the influence of the Celtic languages on English is hampered by a lack of written sources.

== Middle English as a semi-creole ==
A number of linguists, such as John Holm, have argued that creolisation occurs along a cline, that is, that a language can be creolised to various degrees. Even if Middle English does not fully satisfy the criteria that would make it a creole, it has been argued that it might still be characterisable as a semi-creole. A semi-creole is defined as a language that harbors symptoms of a break in transmission due to large-scale adult acquisition, without those symptoms being extreme enough to put it in the creole class. Such languages are often thought of as dialects of the lexifier language rather than as different languages. Recognized examples of semi-creoles include Afrikaans (Dutch as morphologically streamlined by contact with Khoisan), Reunionnais French, Lingala, and Shaba Swahili. McWhorter argues that English is even more extreme than Afrikaans in having shed much of its Germanic content, and therefore that the case for describing English as a semi-creole is even stronger than for Afrikaans.

== See also ==
- English-based creole languages
- History of English
- Influence of French on English
- Language convergence – Type of linguistic change
- Germanic substrate hypothesis
