= West Saxon =

West Saxon may mean:

- of or relating to Wessex, the kingdom of the West Saxons
- West Saxon dialect of Old English
