= Influence of French on English =

The influence of French on English pertains mainly to its lexicon, including its orthography, and to some extent its syntax and pronunciation. Most of the French vocabulary in English entered the language after the Norman Conquest in 1066. Old French, specifically the Old Norman dialect, became the language of the new Anglo-Norman court, the government, and the elites. That period lasted for several centuries through the Hundred Years' War (1337–1453). However, English has continued to be influenced by French. Estimates of the proportion of English vocabulary that originates from French range from one third to two thirds.

== Background ==
=== Before 1066 ===
In the early 11th century, Old English was not a single unified language but a dialect continuum that stretched from the southern English coast to the Forth estuary. However, a literary standard had emerged that was based around the West Saxon dialect spoken in the area centred on Winchester, the capital of Wessex. Also spoken in the territory ruled by the Anglo-Saxons were the Celtic languages of Old Cornish, Old Welsh, and Cumbric, mainly in peripheral regions in which settlement by the Anglo-Saxons had been fairly minor, and Old Norse across a wide swath of territory in the North and the East of England.

=== Norman claim on England and consequences ===
During Harold Godwinson's visit to Normandy in 1064, he was captured by Guy I, Count of Ponthieu and handed over to William, who used Harold to subdue Conan, the count of Brittany. A condition of Harold's release was that he promised to become William's vassal and prepare the way for Norman rule of England. Thus, William felt wronged when Harold was crowned Harold II of England in January 1066.

William II of Normandy landed at Hastings, Sussex, on 29 September 1066. He deployed his men in the nearby area while he waited for King Harold Godwinson's troops. On 14 October, exhausted by previous clashes with Scandinavians in the north and the long journey to Hastings, the English army quickly lost the battle and became disorganised after Harold was killed. After the defeat of the English, William claimed the throne as King of England on 25 December 1066. He was crowned William I of England and came to be known as William the Conqueror, Guillaume le Conquérant in French.

William's followers became a new Norman ruling class and imposed their language on the upper echelons of society. Anglo-Saxon dialects were supplanted by Norman in the royal court and aristocratic circles, the justice system, and the Church. Influential Norman settlers used their native language in daily life. More modest rural and urban areas of society continued to speak varieties of Anglo-Saxon (or proto-English).

The Norman Conquest marked the beginning of a long period of interaction between England and France. Noble English families, most of them of Norman origin, taught their children French or sent them to study in France. The early Norman kings spent more time in Normandy than in England. Royal marriages encouraged the expansion of the French language in England. From Henry II Plantagenet and Eleanor of Aquitaine in the early 12th century to Henry VI and Margaret of Anjou in the 15th century, many English kings married French princesses, which kept French as the language of the English court for several centuries, and strengthened its use in England overall.

=== Decline of French as prestige language in England ===
Throughout the late 11th and 12th centuries, the Norman nobility ruled over both England and Normandy. In 1204, Normandy was lost to France and so the aristocracy began to associate more with an English identity. Anti-French sentiment in England began to grow after Henry III invited relatives of his wife, Eleanor of Provence, to settle in England and bestowed lavish favours on them. Written works promoting the use of English in England began to appear around then, such as the Cursor Mundi. Meanwhile, the French spoken in England was stigmatised as a provincial variety by French speakers from the Continent, particularly because the Anglo-Norman language that was spoken by the elites had taken on a syntactical structure that resembled English. Some nobles had simply shifted to English entirely.

In 1328, Charles IV of France died without an heir. Edward III of England and Philip VI of France disputed the French throne, and the Hundred Years' War ensued. The war provoked further negative feelings towards French in England, as it came to be seen as the language of the enemy. English had reasserted itself as a language of government and learning after over 200 years as a language of low prestige. In 1349, English became the language of instruction at the University of Oxford, which had taught in French or Latin.

In 1476, the use of English became widespread through the introduction of printing to England by William Caxton. Henry IV (1367–1413) was the first English king whose first language was English. Henry V (1387–1422) was the first king of England to use English in official documents.

== Lexical ==
The most notable influence of French on English has been its extensive contribution to the English lexicon. It has been estimated that about a third of the words in English are French in origin. Linguist Henriette Walter claims that this total may be as high as two thirds. Linguist Anthony Lacoudre has estimated that over 40,000 English words come directly from French, and may be understood without orthographical change by French speakers.

In 2013, Albert C. Baugh and Thomas Cable noted that "although this influx of French words was brought about by the victory of the Conqueror and by the political and social consequences of that victory, it was neither sudden nor immediately apparent. Rather it began slowly and continued with varying tempo for a long time. Indeed, it can hardly be said to have ever stopped." Baugh and Cable define several categories of early French borrowings:

- Government and social class (revenue, authority, realm, duke, count, marquis, servant, peasant)
- Church (religion, sermon, prayer, abbey, saint, faith, pray, convent, cloister)
- Law (justice, crime, jury, pardon, indict, arrest, felon, evidence)
- War (army, navy, battle, garrison, captain, sergeant, combat, defence)
- Fashion (gown, robe, frock, collar, satin, crystal, diamond, coat, embroidery)
- Food (feast, taste, mackerel, salmon, bacon, fry, mince, plate, goblet)
- Learning and medicine (paper, preface, study, logic, surgeon, anatomy, stomach, remedy, poison)

Other times, the same French word was borrowed twice, once from the Norman dialect and then again from the Parisian dialect, with different meanings arising. Such doublets include Norman catch vs Parisian chase, Norman warranty vs Parisian guarantee and Norman warden vs Parisian guardian.

The period from 1250 to 1400 was the most prolific for borrowed words from French. Forty percent of all the French words in English appear for the first time between these two dates. After this period, the scale of the lexical borrowing decreased sharply, though French loan words have continued to enter English even into the modern era.

== Morphological and syntactical ==
The gradual decline of the English singular pronouns thou and thee and their replacement with ye and later you have been linked to the parallel French use of vous in formal settings. The ubiquity of -s to mark plurals in English has also been attributed to French influence. The -s ending was common in English prior to the Norman Conquest, since -as was the standard suffix form for plurals of strong masculine nouns in the nominative and accusative cases. It is possible that the dominance of that form over other endings such as -en was strengthened by the similarity of the French plural construction.

Other suggestions include the impersonal one ("one does what one wants") and possessive phrases such as "the guitar of David", rather than "David's guitar". Similar forms are found in other Germanic languages, which casts doubt on the proposed French derivations. Attempts have also been made to connect the increased use of gerunds towards the end of the Middle English period to the French gérondif form.

They are fairly rare in English, but constructions that place the adjective after the noun (attorney general) are derived from French.

English has adopted several prefix and suffix morphemes from French, including pre-, -ous, -ity, -tion, -ture, -ment, -ive and -able. They now stand alongside native English forms such as over-, -ish, -ly, -ness, -ship, -some, -less and -ful.

== Phonological ==
The influence of French on English pronunciation is generally held to have been fairly minor, but a few examples have been cited:

- The use of non-word-initial stress patterns in some loan words of French origin
- The phonemisation of the voiced fricatives /z/ and /v/. In Old English, they were allophones of their voiceless counterparts, /s/ and /f/, a pattern that can still be seen in some dialects of West Country English
- The use of the diphthong /oi/
- The development of the sequence /juː/, from Norman /yː/ merging with native diphthongs /iw/, /ew/, and /ɛw/

John Wells has argued that, as educated British speakers often attempt to pronounce French names in a French way, there is a case for including /ɒ̃/ (as in bon), and /æ̃/ and /ɜ̃ː/ (as in vingt-et-un), as marginal members of the RP vowel system. He argues against including other French vowels on the grounds that not many British speakers succeed in distinguishing the vowels in bon and banc, or in rue and roue. However, the Cambridge English Pronouncing Dictionary draws a distinction between /ɒ̃/ (there rendered as /ɔ̃ː/), and the unrounded /ɑ̃ː/ of banc, for a total of four nasal vowels.

== Orthographic ==
In the centuries following the Norman conquest, English was written mainly by Norman scribes. Thus, French spelling conventions had a great effect on the developing English orthography. Innovations that then arose include the following:

- "qu-" instead of "cw-" (queen)
- "gh" instead of "h" (night)
- "ch" or "cch" instead of "c" (church)
- "ou" instead of "u" (house)
- "sh" or "sch" instead of "sc" (ship)
- "dg" instead of "cg" or "gg" (bridge)
- "o" instead of "u" (love, son; the "u" that was originally in such words was considered difficult to distinguish from the surrounding letters)
- doubling of vowels to represent long vowel sounds (see)
- doubling of consonants after short vowels (sitting)
- more use of "k", "v", "z" and "j"

Several letters derived from Germanic runes or Irish script that had been common in Old English, such as ƿ and ð, largely fell out of use, possibly because the Normans were unfamiliar with them. þ, the final remaining runic letter in English, survived in a severely-altered form until the 17th century.

== Miscellaneous ==
The effects of the Norman conquest had an indirect influence on the development of the standardized English that began to emerge towards the end of the 15th century. The takeover of the elite class by the Normans, as well as their decision to move the capital of England from Winchester to London, ended the dominance of the Late West Saxon literary language, from areas such as Hampshire, Wiltshire and Somerset.

Beginning in the 600s, the East Saxons, who governed London as part of Middlesex, laid the foundation of the early dialect. It had strong ties to the West Saxon dialect due to their cultural and geographical proximity to Wessex, but the city's unique geography made it acquire influences from the neighboring Anglo-Saxon kingdoms of Kent and Mercia. This linguistic mixing is clearly recorded in official documents many centuries later, such as King Henry III’s 1258 proclamation of the Provisions of Oxford, which blended Southern (West Saxon) and East Midlands (Mercian) elements. A similar blend appeared in 14th-century London charters, which also displayed distinct Kentish features.

Between the late 14th and early 15th centuries, a significant influx of migrants from the Central East Midlands (comprising Bedfordshire, Leicestershire, Northamptonshire, and western Cambridgeshire) settled in London. This shifted the predominance of features from Southwestern to East Midlands dialects. The clash of these linguistic varieties spurred the development of a new prestige London dialect. While based primarily on East Midlands speech, it also integrated influences from East Anglia (comprising modern-day Norfolk, Suffolk, and the northeastern parts of Cambridgeshire and Essex) and the North of England, following prior migrations in the early 14th century.

By the late 15th century, the localized London dialect shifted to a predominantly East Midlands form, which the Chancery adopted for official use. This "Chancery Standard" was permanently cemented when William Caxton established England's first printing press in Westminster in 1476, using this dialect for his mass-produced publications, which established it as the foundation for Early Modern English.

=== Personal names ===
The Normans had a strong influence on English personal names. Old English names such as Alfred, Wulfstan, Aelfric, Harold, Godwin and Athelstan largely fell out of fashion and were replaced with Hebrew, Greek, or Christian names, such as John, Peter and Simon, as well as Normanized Germanic names like William, Richard, Henry, Robert, Roger and Hugh.

== Norman culinary myth ==
The Norman culinary myth is a long-standing but historically inaccurate explanation for certain English culinary terms of French origin. It claims that after the Norman Conquest of 1066, English-speaking peasants tended the animals, while French-speaking Norman nobles ate their meat, hence the supposed division between Anglo-Saxon words for live animals (e.g., cow, sheep, pig) and French-derived words for their meat (e.g., beef, mutton, pork).

=== Origins of the myth ===
The idea first appeared in the 17th century with John Wallis, who in 1653 proposed that the linguistic division reflected the differing social roles of Normans and Anglo-Saxons: the former engaged in dining, the latter in husbandry. This explanation was later popularized by Sir Walter Scott in Ivanhoe (1819), where a conversation between Gurth and Wamba dramatizes this class-based linguistic divide in twelfth-century England. Scott's literary treatment embedded the notion in the cultural imagination, turning it into an enduring linguistic myth. Owen Barfield's History in English Words from 1926 popularized it further.

=== Scholarly reassessment ===
Modern linguistic scholarship has shown that the supposed distinction did not exist during the Middle Ages. Studies by Őrsi (2015) and Hejná & Walkden (2022) demonstrate that French-derived food terms were first recorded around 1300 and, for centuries, could still refer both to the living animal and to its meat. The exclusive association of French terms with prepared food, and English terms with live animals, only solidified gradually after 1500 and became entrenched by the 19th century, long after the Norman Conquest.

=== Persistence and cultural significance ===
Although historically inaccurate, the myth endures as an illustration of perceived class and linguistic stratification in post-Conquest England. Its persistence owes much to nineteenth-century nationalism and to Scott's influence, which reinforced a romanticized image of Norman-French aristocracy and Anglo-Saxon peasantry. Doubts about the accuracy of Scott's depiction have existed since at least the 1850s. A few scholars, notably Otto Jespersen and Robert Burchfield, commented on the inaccuracies throughout the 20th century, calling it a misconception. The myth grew in popularity throughout the 20th and early 21st century, especially with the rise of the internet. It is presented as fact in sources such as Steven Bird's Language Log from 2004, and John Algeo's The Origins and Development of the English Language from 2010.

Since the 2010s linguists have come to view the myth less as a reflection of medieval social reality than as a projection of later social and cultural attitudes about language, class, and identity.

== Examples of English words of French origin ==
Though the following list is in no way exhaustive, it illustrates some of the more common English words of French origin. Examples of French-to-English lexical contributions are classified by field and in chronological order. The periods during which these words were used in the English language are specified to the extent that this is possible.

=== Law and society ===
- Crown: from couronne, 12th c.
- Custom: from custume, 12th–13th c.
- Squire: from escuier, the bearer of the écu, bouclier, 12th–13th c.
- Assizes: from assises, 13th c.
- Franchise: from franchise, 13th c.
- Joust: from joust, 13th c.
- Justice: from justice
- Marriage: from mariage, spouses' belongings, 13th c.
- Parliament: from parlement, conversation, 13th c.
- Heir: from heir, 13th c.
- Summon: from semondre, invite someone to do something, 13th c.
- Nice: from nice, idiot/stupid, 13th–14th c.
- Bourgeois, from bourgeois, 19th c.
- Fiancé, from fiancé, 19th c.
- Chef/chief, from chef, 19th c.

=== Commerce ===
- Caterer: from Old Norman acatour, buyer, 11th c.
- Pay: from paier, appease, 12th c.
- Ticket: from estiquet, small sign, 12th c.
- Purchase: from prochacier, "to try obtain (something)", 12th c.
- Rental: from rental, subject to an annual fee, 12th c.
- Debt: from det, 12th c.
- Affair: from à faire, 13th c.
- Bargain: from bargaignier, hesitate, 14th c.
- Budget: from bougette, small fabric pocket for coins and bills of exchange.

=== Sport ===
- Champion: from champion, end 12th c.
- Sport: from desport, entertainment, 12th c.
- Challenge: from chalenge, 14th c.
- Record: from record, 12th–13th c.
- To record: from recorder, 12th–13th c.
- Court: from court/curt/cort, 13th c.
- Tennis: from tenez, hold, 14th c.
- Hockey: from hocquet, hooked stick, date unknown.

=== Domestic life ===
- Aunt: from ante, 12th c.
- Butler: from bouteleur, 12th c., or bouteiller,14th c., sommelier.
- Chamber: from chambre, 13th c.
- Curtain: from cortine, bed curtain, 13th c.
- Blanket: from blanquette, white sheet cover, 13th c.
- Towel: from toailler, 13th c.
- Chair: from chaiere, 13th c.
- Pantry: from paneterie, bread storage place, 13th c.
- Cushion: from coissin, 14th c.
- Closet: from closet, small enclosure, 14th c.

=== Food and cooking ===
- Cabbage: from caboche, "head" in Norman-Picard language, 11th c.
- Bacon: from bacon, pork meat, "Salted bacon arrow", beginning of the 12th c.
- Custard: from crouste, crust, 12th–13th c.
- Toast: from the verb toster, to grill, 12th–13th c.
- Cauldron: from Anglo-Norman caudron, 12th–13th c.
- Cattle: from Anglo-Normand catel, property, 12th–13th c.
- Mustard: from moustarde, condiment made from seeds mixed with grape must, 13th c.
- Grape: from grape, bunch of grapes, 13th c.
- Mutton: from moton, sheep, end 13th c.
- Beef: from buef, beef, circa 1300.
- Pork: from porc, circa 1300.
- Poultry: from pouletrie, poultry (the animal), circa end 14th c.
- Claret: from claret, red wine, 14th c.
- Mince: from mincier, to cut in small pieces, 14th c.
- Stew: from estuver, to "soak in a hot bath", 14th c.
- Veal: from vel, calf, 14th c.
- Banquet: from banquet, 15th c.
- Carrot: 16th c.
- Aperitif: 16th c.
- Hors d’œuvre: end 17th c.
- Douceur (small gift, gratuity): end 17th c.
- Casserole (stewed dish): end 17th c.
- Menu: end 17th c.
- Gratin: end 17th c.
- Terrine: 18th c.
- Croissant: 19th c.
- Foie gras: 19th c.
- Mayonnaise: 19th c.
- Buffet: 19th c.
- Restaurant: 19th c.
- Bouillon: 20th c.
- Velouté: 20th c.
- Confit: 20th c.
- À la carte: 20th c.

=== Art of living and fashion ===
- Gown: from gone, pantyhose, 12th century
- Attire: from atir, "what is used for clothing", 12th century
- Petticoat: from petti ("of little value") and cotte ("long tunic"), 13th century
- Poney: from poulenet or poleney, foal, date unknown.
- Toilette: 17th century
- Lingerie: end 17th century
- Blouse: end 17th century
- Rouge: from rouge à lèvres, lipstick, end 17th century
- Salon: end 17th century
- Couturier: 19th century
- Luxe: 19th century
- Eau de Cologne/Cologne: 19th century
- Massage: 19th century
- Renaissance: 19th century
- Chic: 20th century
- Boutique: 20th century
- Prêt à porter: 20th century
- Libertine: 20th century
- Parfum/perfume: from parfum 20th century
- Déjà vu: 20th century

=== Other domains ===
- Canvas: from Norman-Picard canevas, 11th century
- Catch: from Old Norman cachier, to hunt, 11th–12th century
- Proud: from prud, valiant, beginning 12th century
- Causeway: from Anglo-Norman calciata, 12th century
- Kennel: from Anglo-Norman kenil, dog, 12th–13th century
- Guile: from guile, fraud/deceitfulness, 12th–13th century
- Foreign: from forain, "the stranger", 12th–13th century
- Grief: from grief, 12th–13th century
- Solace: from soulace, "the rejoicing", 12th–13th century
- Scorn: from escorner, to insult, 12th–13th century
- Square: from esquarre, 12th–13th century
- Conceal: from conceler, to hide, 12th–13th century
- Strive: from estriver, to make efforts, 12th–13th century
- Very: from veray, true, 12th–13th century
- Faint: from feint, soft/unenthusiastic, 12th–13th century
- Eager: from egre, sour, 12th–13th century
- Change: from the verb changier, to change, 13th century
- Chapel: from chapele, 13th century
- Choice: from chois, 13th century
- Mischief: from meschef, misfortune, 13th century
- Achieve: from achever, come to an end/accomplish (a task), 13th century
- Bizarre: 17th century
- Rendezvous: 17th century

== See also ==
- History of English
- Francophonie
- Geographical distribution of French speakers
- Glossary of French words and expressions in English
- Organisation internationale de la Francophonie

== Bibliography ==
- Chirol, Laure (1973). Les « mots français » et le mythe de la France en anglais contemporain (in French). Paris: Klincksieck. p. 215.
- Duchet, Jean-Louis (1994). Éléments pour une histoire de l'accentuation lexicale en anglais », Études Anglaises : Grande-Bretagne. Vol. 47. États-Unis. pp. 161–170.
- Kristol Andres Max, « Le début du rayonnement parisien et l'unité du français au Moyen âge : le témoignage des manuels d'enseignement du français écrits en Angleterre entre le XIIIe et le début du XVe siècle », Revue de Linguistique Romane, vol. 53, (1989), pp. 335–367.
- Lusignan, Serge (2004). La langue des rois au Moyen Âge. Le français en France et en Angleterre (in French). Paris: PUF. p. 296.
- Mossé Fernand, Esquisse d'une histoire de la langue anglaise, 1^{ère} édition, Lyon, IAC, 1947, 268 p.
- Rothwell William, « À quelle époque a-t-on cessé de parler français en Angleterre ? », Mélanges de philologie romane offerts à Charles Camproux, 1978, pp. 1075–1089.
- Walter, Henriette (2001). Honni soit qui mal y pense : l'incroyable histoire d'amour entre le français et l'anglais (in French). Paris: Robert Laffont. p. 364.

== Sources ==
- Inwood, Stephen (1998). A History of London. Macmillan. ISBN 0-333-67153-8.
- Roach, Peter (2011), Cambridge English Pronouncing Dictionary (18th ed.), Cambridge: Cambridge University Press, ISBN 9780521152532
- Upward, Christopher; Davidson, George (2011). The History of English Spelling. England. ISBN 978-1-4443-4297-0. Archived from the original on 14 August 2025.
- Wells, John C. (2008), Longman Pronunciation Dictionary (3rd ed.), Longman, ISBN 978-1-4058-8118-0
