= Ivan Rayment =

British crystallographer and molecular biologist

Ivan Rayment is a British crystallographer and molecular biologist.

Rayment earned his bachelor's and doctoral degrees at Durham University. He began his teaching career as an assistant professor at the University of Arizona between 1984 and 1988. He then joined the University of Wisconsin–Madison faculty as an associate professor, and became a full professor in 1994. In 1998, Rayment was elected a fellow of the American Association for the Advancement of Science, and later named the Michael G. Rossmann Professor of Biochemistry at UW–Madison.

Rayment is married to Hazel Holden, who has also taught at UW–Madison.
