= Anglo-Norman language =

Extinct dialect of Old Norman used in England

Anglo-Norman
- Anglo-Normaund
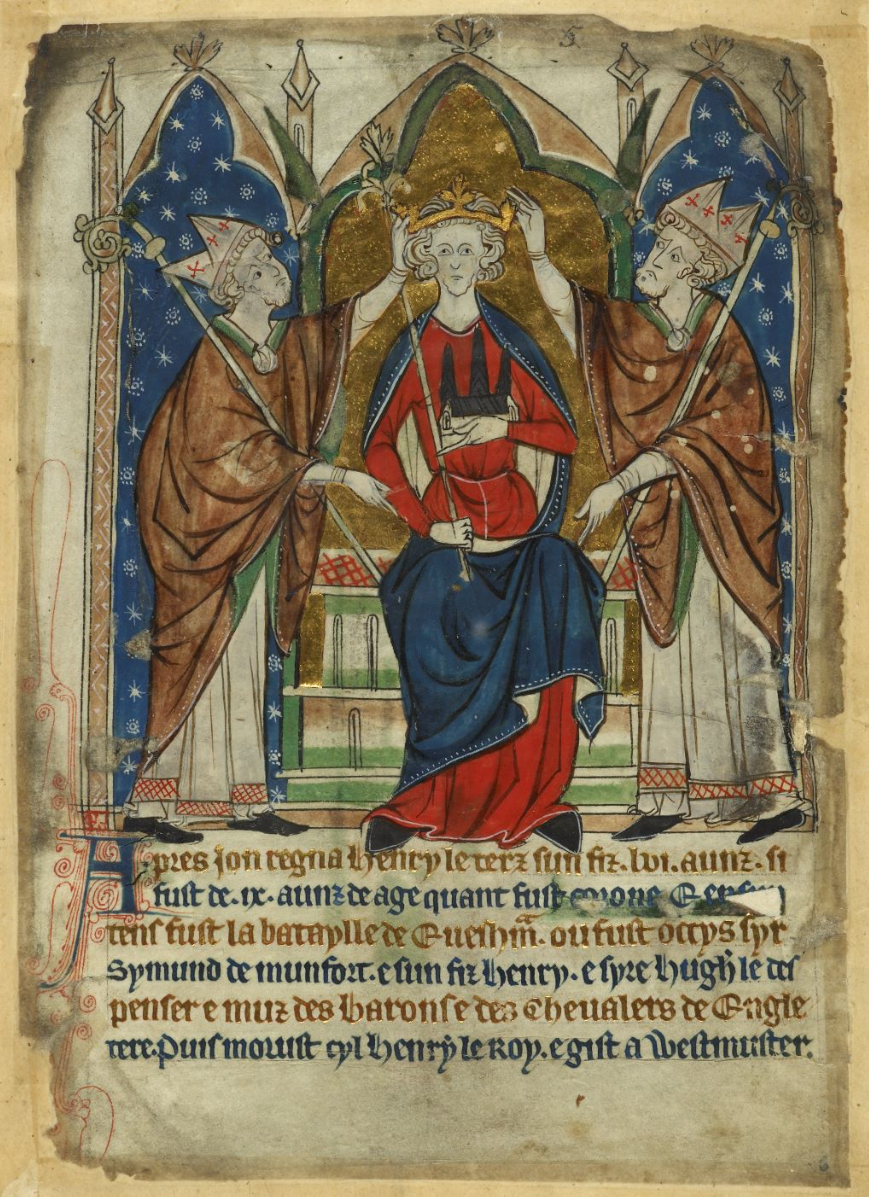
- Manuscript miniature of the coronation of Henry III, accompanied by a short account of his reign in Anglo-Norman prose
- Region: Great Britain and Ireland
- Ethnicity: Anglo-Normans
- Extinct: 15th century AD
- Language family: Indo-European: Italic; Latino-Faliscan; Latinic; Romance; Italo-Western; Western; Gallo-Iberian?; Gallo-Romance; Gallo-Rhaetian?; Arpitan–Oïl; Oïl; Frankish zone; Northern Norman; Anglo-Norman
- Early forms: Old Latin: Vulgar Latin; Proto-Romance; Old Gallo-Romance; Old French; Old Norman

Language codes
- ISO 639-3: xno
- Glottolog: angl1258
- Anglo-Norman is an Extinct language according to the classification system of the UNESCO Atlas of the World's Languages in Danger

Anglo-Norman (Norman: Anglo-Normaund; French: Anglo-normand), also known as Anglo-Norman French, Insular French, and part of the French of England (which includes Anglo-French) was a dialect of Old Norman that was used in England and, to a lesser extent, other places in Great Britain and Ireland during the Anglo-Norman period.

== Origin ==
The term "Anglo-Norman" dates back to the time when the language was regarded as being primarily the regional Old French vernacular dialect of the Norman settlers after the Norman Conquest of England. Today the generic term "Anglo-French" is used instead to reflect not only the broader origin of the settlers who came with William the Conqueror, who spoke a wide range of Old French dialects, but also the continued influence of Parisian French from the Plantagenet period onwards.

Some modern scholars and linguists argue the name "Insular French" to be more accurate, because "Anglo-Norman" is persistently associated with the notion of a non-extant mixed language based on English and Norman. Rather, these scholars argue Anglo-Norman was “a full and independent member of the extended family of medieval French dialects” that exhibited multidialectal contact and lived alongside English. Other scholars, however, indicate otherwise and that it was a language descended from the Norman French originally established in England after the Norman conquest in 1066.

Although Anglo-Norman and Anglo-French were eventually eclipsed by Modern English, they had been used widely enough to influence English vocabulary permanently. This means that many original Germanic words, cognates of which can still be found in Nordic, German, and Dutch, have been lost or, as is more often the case, exist alongside synonyms of Anglo-Norman French origin. Anglo-Norman had little lasting influence on English grammar, as opposed to vocabulary, although it is still evident in official and legal terms where the ordinary sequence of noun and adjective is reversed, as seen in phrases such as Blood Royal, attorney general, heir apparent, court martial, envoy extraordinary and body politic.

The royal coat of arms of the United Kingdom still features in French the mottos of both the British Monarch, Dieu et mon droit ("God and my right"), and the Order of the Garter, Honi soit qui mal y pense ("Shamed be he who thinks evil of it").

Dieu et mon droit was first used by Richard I (who spoke Anglo-Norman, but cannot be proved to have been able to speak English) in 1198 and adopted as the royal motto of England in the time of Henry VI. The motto appears below the shield of the Royal Coat of Arms.

== Use and development ==
Though in regular use at the royal court, Anglo-French was not the main administrative language of England: Latin was the major language of record in legal and other official documents for most of the medieval period. However, from the mid-13th century to the early 15th century, Anglo-French was much used in law reports, charters, ordinances, official correspondence, and trade at all levels; it was the language of the King, his court and the upper class. There is evidence, too, that foreign words (Latin, Greek, Italian, Arabic, Spanish) often entered English via Anglo-Norman.

The language of later documents adopted some of the changes ongoing in continental French and lost many of its original dialectal characteristics, so Anglo-French remained (in at least some respects and at least at some social levels) part of the dialect continuum of modern French, often with distinctive spellings. Over time, the use of Anglo-French expanded into the fields of law, administration, commerce, and science, in all of which a rich documentary legacy survives, indicative of the vitality and importance of the language.

By the late 15th century, however, what remained of insular French had become heavily anglicised: see Law French. It continued to be known as "Norman French" until the end of the 19th century even though, philologically, there was nothing Norman about it.

Among important writers of the Anglo-Norman cultural commonwealth is Marie de France.

The languages and literature of the Channel Islands are sometimes referred to as Anglo-Norman, but that usage is derived from the French name for the islands: les îles anglo-normandes. The variety of French spoken in the islands is related to the modern Norman language, and distinct from the Anglo-Norman of medieval England.

== Trilingualism in medieval and modern England ==
=== General history in medieval England ===
Many of the earliest documents in Old French are found in England. In medieval France, it was not usual to write in the vernacular because Latin was the language of the Church, education, historiography and it was used for records. In medieval England, Latin also remained in use by the Church, the royal government, and much local administration in parallel with Middle English, as it had been before 1066. The early adoption of Anglo-Norman as a written and literary language probably owes something to this history of bilingualism in writing.

In the first centuries after the Norman Conquest of England, the French-speaking elite primarily relied on Latin for record-keeping rather than their own language, while English continued to have a written tradition and was used in religious services until 1154, when the Angevins came into power. Englishmen seeking words associated with government, culture, or entertainment would likely use French terms in their English speech to operate in upper-middle-class social settings would not only learn some French but also imitate the Frenchified English of bilingual speakers.

Nevertheless, educated Englishmen in the 12th and 13th centuries could read and speak French to some extent. This explains why the first French loanwords entering English were introduced through written texts and passive knowledge of the language rather than active use. However, as French began to be used for record-keeping in England due to its growing prestige during the mid-13th century, approximately 90% of the total 10,000 French loanwords in English began to be documented in the language.

Around the same time, as a shift took place in France towards using French as a language of record in the mid-13th century, Anglo-Norman also became a language of record in England, although Latin retained its pre-eminence for matters of permanent record (as in written chronicles). From around this point onwards, considerable variation begins to be apparent in Anglo-Norman, which ranges from the very local (and most anglicised) to a level of language which approximates to and is sometimes indistinguishable from varieties of continental French. Typically, therefore, local records are rather different from continental French, with diplomatic and international trade documents closest to the emerging continental norm. English remained the vernacular of the common people throughout this period. The resulting virtual trilingualism in spoken and written language was one of medieval Latin, Anglo-Norman and Middle English.

=== Language of the king and his court ===
From the time of the Norman Conquest (1066) until the end of the 14th century, French was the language of the king and his court. During this period, marriages with French princesses reinforced the royal family's ties to French culture. Nevertheless, during the 13th century, intermarriages with English nobility became more frequent. French became progressively a second language among the upper classes. Moreover, with the Hundred Years' War and the growing spirit of English and French nationalism, the status of French diminished.

French (specifically Old French) was the mother tongue of every English king from William the Conqueror (1066–1087) until Henry IV (1399–1413). Henry IV was the first to take the oath in (Middle) English, and his son, Henry V (1413–1422), was the first to write in English. By the end of the 15th century, French became the second language of a cultivated elite.

=== Language of the royal charters and legislation ===
Until the end of the 13th century, Latin was the main language of all official written documents. Nevertheless, some important documents had their official Norman translation, such as Magna Carta of 1215. The first official document written in Anglo-Norman was a statute promulgated by the king in 1275. With effect from the 13th century, Anglo-Norman therefore became used in official documents, such as those that were marked by the private seal of the king whereas the documents sealed by the Lord Chancellor were written in Latin until the end of the Middle Ages. English became the language of Parliament and of legislation in the 15th century, half a century after it had become the language of the king and most of the English nobility.

=== Language of administration and justice ===
During the 11th century, development of the administrative and judicial institutions took place. Because the king and the lawyers at the time normally used French, it also became the language of these institutions.

During the late 14th century, English became the main spoken language, but Latin and French continued to be exclusively used in official legal documents until the beginning of the 18th century. Nevertheless, the French language used in England changed from the end of the 15th century into Law French, that was used since the 13th century. This variety of French was a technical language, with a specific vocabulary, where English words were used to describe everyday experience, and French grammatical rules and morphology gradually declined, with confusion of genders and the adding of -s to form all plurals. Law French was banished from the courts of the common law in 1731, almost three centuries after the king ceased speaking primarily French. French was used on moots in the Inner Temple until 1779.

Anglo-Norman has survived in the political system in the use of certain Anglo-French set phrases in the Parliament of the United Kingdom, where they are written by hand on bills by the Clerk of the Parliaments or Clerk of the House of Commons to endorse them during their progress to becoming law, or spoken aloud by the Clerk of the Parliaments during a gathering of the Lords Commissioners, to indicate the granting of Royal Assent to legislation.

Event	Anglo-Norman phrase	English translation
House of Lords bill sent to House of Commons	Soit baillé aux Communes.	Let it be sent to the Commons.
Lords bill agreed to by Commons without amendment	A ceste Bille les Communes sont assentus.	To this bill the Commons have assented.
Lords bill agreed to by Commons with amendments	A ceste Bille avecque des Amendemens (or avecque une Amendement) les Communes sont assentus.	To this bill with [an] amendment[s] the Commons have assented.
Lords bill agreed to by Lords, after Commons then Lords have amended it (see Parliamentary ping-pong)	A ceste Amendement (or ces Amendemens) avecque une Amendement (or des Amendemens) les Seigneurs sont assentus.	To all these amendments the Lords have assented.
Lords disagree with the Commons	Ceste Bille est remise aux Communes avecque des Raisons (or une Raison).	This bill is returned to the Commons with [a] reason[s].
Commons bill sent to Lords	Soit baillé aux Seigneurs.	Let it be sent to the Lords.
Commons bill returned with Lords' amendments	A ceste Bille avecque des Amendemens (or une Amendement) les Seigneurs sont assentus.	To this bill with [an] amendment[s] the Lords have assented.
Supply bill returned to Commons agreed pending Royal Assent by Commission	A ceste Bille les Seigneurs sont assentus.	To this bill the Lords have assented.
Royal Assent is given for a public bill	Le Roy/La Reyne le veult.	The King/Queen wills it.
Royal Assent is given for a supply bill	Le Roy/La Reyne remercie ses bons sujets, accepte leur benevolence et ainsi le veult.	The King/Queen thanks his/her good subjects, accepts their bounty, and wills it so.
Royal Assent is given for a private bill	Soit fait comme il est désiré.	Let it be done as it is desired.
Royal Assent is withheld	Le Roy/La Reyne s'avisera.	The King/Queen will consider it.

The exact spelling of these phrases has varied over the years; for example, s'avisera has been spelled as s'uvisera and s'advisera, and Reyne as Raine.

=== Language of the people ===
Though the great mass of ordinary people spoke forms of English, French spread as a second language due to its prestige, encouraged by its long-standing use in the school system as a medium of instruction through which Latin was taught. In the courts, the members of the jury, who represented the population, had to know French in order to understand the plea of the lawyer. French was used by the merchant middle class as a language of business communication, especially when it traded with the continent, and several churches used French to communicate with lay people. A small but important number of documents survive associated with the Jews of medieval England, some featuring Anglo-French written in Hebrew script, typically in the form of glosses to the Hebrew scriptures.

== Characteristics ==
As a langue d'oïl, Anglo-Norman developed collaterally to the central Old French dialects which would eventually become Parisian French in terms of grammar, pronunciation and vocabulary. Before the signature of the Ordinance of Villers-Cotterêts in 1539, French was not standardised as an administrative language throughout the kingdom of France.

Middle English was heavily influenced by Anglo-Norman and, later, Anglo-French. W. Rothwell has called Anglo-French 'the missing link' because many etymological dictionaries seem to ignore the contribution of that language in English and because Anglo-Norman and Anglo-French can explain the transmission of words from French into English and fill the void left by the absence of documentary records of English (in the main) between 1066 and c. 1380.

Anglo-Norman continued to evolve significantly during the Middle Ages by reflecting some of the changes undergone by the northern dialects of mainland French. For example, early Anglo-Norman legal documents used the phrase "del roy" (of the king), whereas by about 1330 it had become "du roi" as in modern French.

Anglo-Norman morphology and phonology can be exemplified by using its heritage in English as compared with continental Central French. English has many doublets as a result of this contrast:

- warranty – guarantee
- warden – guardian
- catch – chase (see below)

Compare also:

- wage (Anglo-Norman) – gage (French)
- wait – guetter (French, Old French guaitier)
- war (from Anglo-Norman werre) – guerre (French)
- wicket (Anglo-Norman) – guichet (French, from Norman)

The palatalization of velar consonants before the front vowel produced different results in Norman to the central langue d'oïl dialects that developed into French. English therefore, for example, has fashion from Norman féchoun as opposed to Modern French façon (both developing from Latin factio, factiōnem). In contrast, the palatalization of velar consonants before /a/ that affected the development of French did not occur in Norman dialects north of the Joret line. English has therefore inherited words that retain a velar plosive where French has a fricative:

English	< Norman	= French
cabbage	< caboche	= chou, caboche
castle	< caste(-l)	= château
cauldron	< caudron	= chaudron
causeway	< cauchie	= chaussée
catch	< cachi	= chasser
cattle	< *cate(-l)	= cheptel (Old French chetel)
fork	< fouorque	= fourche
garden	< gardin	= jardin
kennel	< kenil	= chenil (Vulgar Latin *canile)
wicket	< viquet	= guichet
plank	< planque	= planche, planque
pocket	< pouquette	= poche

Some loans were palatalised later in English, as in the case of challenge (< Old Norman calonge, Middle English kalange, kalenge, later chalange; Old French challenge, chalonge).

There were also vowel differences: Compare Anglo-Norman profound with Parisian French profond, soun sound with son, round with rond. The former words were originally pronounced something like 'profoond', 'soon', 'roond' respectively (compare the similarly denasalised vowels of modern Norman), but later developed their modern pronunciation in English. The word veil retains the /ei/ (as does modern Norman in vaile and laîsi) that in French has been replaced by /wa/ voile, loisir.

Since many words established in Anglo-Norman from French via the intermediary of Norman were not subject to the processes of sound change that continued in parts of the continent, English sometimes preserves earlier pronunciations. For example, ch used to be /tʃ/ in medieval French, where Modern French has /ʃ/, but English has preserved the older sound (in words like chamber, chain, chase and exchequer). Similarly, j had an older /dʒ/ sound, which it still has in English and some dialects of modern Norman, but it has developed into /ʒ/ in Modern French.

The word mushroom preserves a hush sibilant not recorded in French mousseron, as does cushion for coussin. Conversely, the pronunciation of the word sugar resembles Norman chucre even if the spelling is closer to French sucre. It is possible that the original sound was an apical sibilant, like the Basque s, which is halfway between a hissing sibilant and a hushing sibilant.

The doublets catch and chase are both derived from Low Latin *captiare. Catch demonstrates a Norman development while chase is the French equivalent imported with a different meaning.

Distinctions in meaning between Anglo-Norman and French have led to many faux amis (words having similar form but different meanings) in Modern English and Modern French.

Although it is a Romance language, Norman contains a significant amount of lexical material from Old Norse. Because of this, some of the words introduced to England as part of Anglo-Norman were of Germanic origin. Indeed, sometimes one can identify cognates such as flock (Germanic in English existing prior to the Conquest) and floquet (Germanic in Norman). The case of the word mug demonstrates that in instances, Anglo-Norman may have reinforced certain Scandinavian elements already present in English. Mug had been introduced into northern English dialects by Viking settlement. The same word had been established in Normandy by the Normans (Norsemen) and was then brought over after the Conquest and established firstly in southern English dialects. It is, therefore, argued that the word mug in English shows some of the complicated Germanic heritage of Anglo-Norman.

Many expressions used in English today have their origin in Anglo-Norman (such as the expression before-hand, which derives from Anglo-Norman avaunt-main), as do many modern words with interesting etymologies. Mortgage, for example, literally meant death-wage in Anglo-Norman. Curfew (fr. couvre-feu) meant cover-fire, referring to the time in the evening when all fires had to be covered to prevent the spread of fire within communities with timber buildings. The word glamour is derived from Anglo-Norman grammeire, the same word which gives us modern grammar; glamour meant first "book learning" and then the most glamorous form of book learning, "magic" or "magic spell" in medieval times.

The influence of Anglo-Norman was very asymmetrical: very little influence from English was carried over into the continental possessions of the Anglo-Norman kings. Some administrative terms survived in some parts of mainland Normandy: forlenc (from furrow, compare furlong) in the Cotentin Peninsula and Bessin, and a general use of the word acre (instead of French arpent) for land measurement in Normandy until metrication in the 19th century, but these words are probably linguistic traces of Saxon or Anglo-Scandinavian settlements between the 4th and the 10th centuries in Normandy. Otherwise the direct influence of English in mainland Norman (such as smogler "to smuggle") is from direct contact with English in later centuries, rather than Anglo-Norman.

== Literature ==
When the Normans conquered England, Anglo-Saxon literature had reached a very high level of development. The important Benedictine monasteries both wrote chronicles and guarded other works in Old English. However, with the arrival of the Normans, Anglo-Saxon literature came to an end and literature written in Britain was in Latin or Anglo-Norman. The Plantagenet kings encouraged this Anglo-Norman literature. Nevertheless, from the beginning of the 14th century, some authors chose to write in English, such as Geoffrey Chaucer. The authors of that period were influenced by the works of contemporary French writers whose language was prestigious. Chaucer – himself of Norman origin – is considered to be the father of the English language and the creator of English as a literary language.

== Influence on English ==
According to one study, about 28% of English vocabulary comes from French, including Anglo-French. Such percentages vary greatly depending on what amount of rare and technical words are included in the calculation.

The major Norman-French influence on English can still be seen in today's vocabulary. An enormous number of Norman-French and other medieval French loanwords came into the language, and about three-quarters of them are still used today. Very often, the Norman or French word supplanted the original English term, or both words would co-exist but with slightly different nuances. In other cases, the Norman or French word was adopted to signify a new reality, such as judge, castle, warranty.

In general, the Norman and French borrowings concerned the fields of culture, aristocratic life, politics and religion, and war whereas the English words were used to describe everyday experience. When the Normans arrived in England, their copyists wrote English as they heard it, without realising the peculiarities of the relationship between Anglo-Saxon pronunciation and spelling and so the spelling changed. There appeared different regional Modern-English written dialects, the one that the king chose in the 15th century becoming the standard variety.

In some remote areas, agricultural terms used by the rural workers may have been derived from Norman French. An example is the Cumbrian term sturdy for diseased sheep that walk in circles, derived from étourdi meaning dizzy.

== Influence in Ireland ==
The Norman invasion of Ireland, beginning on 1st May 1169 at Bannow Bay, led to Anglo-Norman control of much of the island. Norman-speakers arrived to administrate the Angevin Empire's new territory. Several Norman words were borrowed into Irish, including household terms: garsún (from Norman garçun, "boy"); cóta (cote, "cloak"); hata (hatte, "hat"); gairdín (gardin, "garden"); and terms relating to justice (Irish giúistís, bardas (corporation), cúirt (court)).

Place-names in Norman are few, but there is Buttevant (from the motto of the Barry family: Boutez en avant, "Push to the fore"), the village of Brittas (from the Norman bretesche, "boarding, planking") and the element Pallas (Irish pailís, from Norman paleis, "boundary fence": compare palisade and The Pale). Others exist with English and Irish roots, such as Castletownroche, which combines the English Castletown and the Norman Roche, meaning rock.

Only a handful of Hiberno-Norman-French texts survive, most notably The Song of Dermot and the Earl, a chanson de geste (early 13th century), and the Statutes of Kilkenny from 1366.

== See also ==
- Anglo-Norman literature
- Anglo-Norman Text Society
- Influence of French on English
- Law French
- Middle English creole hypothesis
- Guernésiais
- Jèrriais
- Auregnais
- Sercquiais
- Blazon § French vocabulary and grammar

== Bibliography ==
- Anglo-Norman Dictionary, online version: http://www.anglo-norman.net. A–S, U, W, Y and Z second edition (2005–); T, V and X reproduce the first (printed edition). The site also provides a searchable textbase of more than 70 Anglo-Norman texts, selected publications by the editorial team, a general introduction to Anglo-Norman and a bibliography of all Anglo-Norman primary sources.
- Brand, Paul (1999), 'The languages of the law in later medieval England'. In Trotter (2000a).
- Brand, Paul. 2010. 'The Language of the English Legal Profession: The Emergence of a Distinctive Legal Lexicon in Insular French'. In Ingham (2010), 94–101.
- Brun, Laurent (2004), c.r. de Ruelle (1999), ZrP 120, 190–194.
- Burgess, Glyn S. (1995), 'Französische Skriptaformen IV. England. Les scriptae françaises IV. Angleterre'. In Holtus, Günter/Metzeltin, Michael/Schmidt, Christian (eds.), Lexikon der Romanistischen Linguistik II, 2. Tübingen, 337–346.
- Butterfield, Ardis. 2009. The Familiar Enemy. Chaucer, Language and Nation in the Hundred Years' War. Oxford: Oxford University Press.
- Cerquiglini, Bernard (1991), La naissance du français, Paris: Presses Universitaires de France.
- Cerquiglini, Bernard (2007), Une langue orpheline, Paris: Éditions de Minuit.
- Chaplais, Pierre. 1975–1982. English Medieval Diplomatic Practice. London: H.M.S.O.
- Clanchy, M.T. (1993), From Memory to Written Record: England 1066–1307. 2nd edn. Oxford.
- Collas, J.P. (1964) (ed.), Year Books of Edward II, vol. xxv, London, 'Problems of Language and Interpretation', 14–127.
- Da Rold, Orietta. 2006. "English Manuscripts 1060 to 1220 and the Making of a Resource." In Literature Compass 3, 750–766, en ligne: http://onlinelibrary.wiley.com/: (DOI:10.1111/j.1741-4113.2006.00344.x), consulté le 14 mai 2013.
- De Jong, Thera (1988), 'L'anglo normand du 13e siècle', in Van Reenen, P. & Van Reenen Stein, K. (eds.), Distributions spatiales et temporelles, constellations des manuscrits. Etudes de variation linguistique offertes à Anthonij Dees à l'occasion de son 60ème anniversaire, Amsterdam, 103 12.
- De Jong, Thera (1996), 'Anglo-French in the 13th and 14th Centuries: Continental or Insular Dialect', in Nielsen/Schǿsler (1996), 55–70.
- Dean, Ruth J.. 1999. Anglo-Norman literature. A guide to texts and manuscripts, with the collaboration of Maureen B.M. Boulton. London: Anglo-Norman Text Society.
- Dees, Anthonij (1980), Atlas des formes et des constructions des chartes françaises du 13e siècle (Beihefte zur ZrP, vol. 178), Tübingen, Niemeyer.
- Dees, Anthonij (1985), Dialectes et scriptae à l'époque de l'ancien français, RLiR 49, 87–117.
- Dees, Anthonij (1987), Atlas des formes linguistiques des textes littéraires de l'ancien français (Beihefte zur ZrP, vol. 212), Tübingen, Niemeyer.
- Dessì Schmid, Sarah/Hafner, Jochen/Heinemann, Sabine (2011) (edd.), Koineisierung und Standardisierung in der Romania, Heidelberg, Winter.
- DMLBS = Latham, Ronald e., David Howlettt, and Richard Ashdowne, Dictionary of Medieval Latin from British Sources. Oxford: British Academy. (1975–).
- Dodd, Gwilym. 2007. Justice and Grace: Private Petitioning and the English Parliament in the Late Middle Ages. Oxford: Oxford University Press.
- Durkin, Philip. 2012. "Etymological research on English words as a source of information about Anglo-French." In Present and future research in Anglo-Norman: Proceedings of the Aberystwyth Colloquium, 21–22 July 2011, ed. David Trotter, 101–107. Aberystwyth: Anglo-Norman Online Hub.
- Duval, Frédéric (2009), Le français médiéval (L'Atelier du médiéviste, 11), Turnhout, Brepols.
- Georgo, David. 2008. Language Made Visible: The Invention of French in England after the Norman Conquest. PhD diss., New York State University, UMI No. 3307998.
- Gervers, Michael/ Merrilees, Brian (1979), A twelfth-century Hospitaller charter in Anglo-Norman, Journal of the Society of Archivists 6, 131–35.
- Glessgen, Martin-Dietrich (2012), Trajectoires et perspectives en scriptologie romane, Medioevo Romanzo 36, 5–23.
- Goebl, Hans (1970), Die normandische Urkundensprache. Ein Beitrag zur Kenntnis der nordfranzösischen Urkundensprachen des Mittelalter (Sitzungsberichte der Österreichischen Akademie der Wissenschaften, Phil.-hist.Klasse, 269), Vienne, Bohlau.
- Goebl, Hans (1998), Zu einer dialektometrischen Analyse der Daten des Dees-Atlasses von 1980, in: Werner, Edeltraudet al. (edd.), Et multum et multa. Festschrift für Peter Wunderli zum 60. Geburtstag, Tübingen, Narr, 293–309.
- Goebl, Hans (2008), Sur le changement macrolinguistique survenu entre 1300 et 1900 dans le domaine d'oïl. Une étude diachronique d'inspiration dialectométrique, Dialectologia 1, 3–43 [disponible en ligneà l'addresse suivante: (consulté le 02.02.14)]
- Gossen, Charles Théodore (1968a), Graphème et phonème: le problème central de l'étude des langues écrites au Moyen Age, RLiR 32, 1–16.
- Gossen, Charles Théodore (1968b), L'interprétation des graphèmes et la phonétique historique de la langue française, TraLiLi 6/i (1968), 149–168.
- Gossen, Charles Théodore (1979), Méditations scriptologiques, CCM 22, 263–283.
- Goyens, Michèle/Verbeke, Werner (2003) (edd.), The Dawn of the Written Vernacular in Western Europe, Leuven, Leuven University Press.
- Grübl, Klaus (2013), La standardisation du français au Moyen Âge: point de vue scriptologique, RLiR 77, 344–383.
- Henry, Albert (1986), Un texte œnologique de Jofroi de Waterford et Servais Copale, Romania 107, 1–37 [première publication: idem, Contribution à l'étude du language œnologique en langue d'oïl, Bruxelle, Académie Royale de Belgique, I, 45–53 et II, 37–49].
- Howlett, David (1996), The English Origins of Old French Literature, Dublin, Four Courts Press.
- Hunt, Tony. (2000), 'Code-switching in medical texts'. In Trotter (2000a).
- Hunt, Tony. 2003. "Anglo-Norman: Past and Future." In The Dawn of the Written Vernacular in Western Europe, edd. Michèle Goyens and Werner Verbele, 379–389. Leuven: Leuven University Press.
- Ingham, Richard (2012), The transmission of Anglo-Norman: Language History and Language Acquisition, Amsterdam, Benjamins.
- Ingham, Richard, 'Mixing languages on the Manor', Medium Aevum 78 (2009), 80–97 (=2009a).
- Ingham, Richard, 'Syntactic change in Anglo-Norman and Continental French Chronicles: was there a 'Middle' Anglo-Norman?', Journal of French Language Studies 16 (2006), 26–49.
- Ingham, Richard, 'The status of French in medieval England: evidence from the use of object pronoun syntax', Vox Romanica 65 (2006), 1–22.
- Jefferson, Lisa (2000), 'The Language and vocabulary of the fourteenth-and early fifteenth-century records of the Goldsmiths' Company, in Trotter (2000a), 175–211.
- Jefferson, Lisa and Rothwell, William (1997), 'Society and lexis: a study of the Anglo-French vocabulary in the fifteenth-century accounts of the Merchants Taylors Company'. Zeitschrift für französische Sprache und Literatur, 107, 273–301.
- Kabatek, Johannes (2013), Koinés and scriptae, in: MAIDEN, Martin/ SMITH, John Charles/ Ledgeway, Adam (edd.), Cambridge History of the Romance Languages, 2: Contexts, Cambridge, Cambridge University Press, 143–186.
- Koch, Peter (2010), Sprachgeschichte zwischen Nähe und Distanz: Latein – Französisch– Deutsch, in: Ágel, Vilmos/Hennig, Mathilde (edd.), Nähe und Distanz im Kontenxt variationslinguistischer Forschung, Berlin/ New York, De Gruyter, 155–205.
- Kowaleski, Maryanne. 2007. "Alien" encounters in the maritime world of medieval England. Medieval Encounters 13:96–121.
- Kristol, Andres (1989), Le début du rayonnement parisien et l'unité du français au Moyen Âge: le témoignage des manuels d'enseignement du français publiés en Angleterre entre le XIIIe et le début du XVe siècle, RLiR 53, 335–367.
- Kristol, Andres (1990), 'L'enseignement du français en Angleterre (XIIIe-XVe siècles): les sources manuscrites', Romania, 111, 298–330.
- Kristol, Andres (2000), 'L'intellectuel 'anglo-normand' face à la pluralité des langues: le témoignage implicite du Ms Oxford, Magdalen Lat. 188', in Trotter (2000a), 37- 52.
- Legge, Dominica (1965), La précocité de la littérature Anglo-normande, CCM 8, 327–349.
- Lodge, Anthony R. (2004), A Sociolinguistic History of Parisian French, Cambridge, Cambridge University Press.
- Lodge, Anthony R. (2010a), The Sources of Standardisation in French – Written or Spoken?, in: INGHAM (2010), 26–43.
- Lodge, Anthony R. (2010b), Standardisation, koinéisation et l'historiographie du français, RLiR 74, 5–26.
- Lodge, Anthony R. (2011), Standardisation et Koinéisation: Deux approaches contraires à l'historiographie d'une langue, in: Dessì Schmid/Hafner/Heinemann (2011), 65–79.
- Lusignan, Serge (1986), Parler vulgairement. Les intellectuels et la langue française aux XIIIe et XIVe siècles. Paris/Montréal.
- Lusignan, Serge (2004), La langue des rois au Moyen Âge: le français en France et en Angleterre, Paris, Presses universitaires de France.
- Lusignan, Serge (2005) La Langue des rois au Moyen Âge. Paris: PUF.
- Lusignan, Serge (2011), Le français médiéval: perspectives historiques sur une langue plurielle, in: Lusignan, Serge/ Martineau, France/Morin, Yves Charles/Cohen, Paul, L'introuvable unité du français. Contacts et variations linguistiques en Europe et en Amérique (XIIe-XVIIIe siècle), Laval, Presses de l'Université Laval, 5–107.
- Maitland F.W. (1903), Year Books of Edward II, Vol. I: 1 & 2 Edward II, London, Selden Society XVII, Introduction, III, 'Of The Anglo-French Language in the Early Year Books', xxxiii–lxxxi.
- Matsumura, Takeshi (2004), c.r. de Ruelle (1999), RLiR 68, 284–285.
- McClure, Peter. 2010. "Middle English occupational bynames as lexical evidence: a study of names in the Nottingham borough court rolls 1303–1455." Transactions of the Philological Society 108:164–177 et 213–231.
- Menger, L.E. (1904), The Anglo Norman Dialect, New York.
- Möhren, Frankwalt (1974), 'Apport des textes techniques à la lexicologie: terminologie anglo-normande de l'agriculture', XIV Congresso Internazionale Di Linguistica e Filologia Romanza, Atti, t. 4, Napoli (Gaetano Macchiaroli, ed), Amsterdam, 143–157.
- Möhren, Frankwalt (1981), 'Agn. AFRE / AVER. Eine wortgeschichtliche und wissenschaftsgeschichtliche Untersuchung', Archiv für das Studium der neueren Sprachen und Literaturen 218,129–136.
- Möhren, Frankwalt (1986), Wort- und sachgeschichtliche Untersuchungen an französischen landwirtschaftlichen Texten, 13., 14. und 18. Jahrhundert (Seneschaucie, Menagier, Encyclopédie), Tübingen (Niemeyer).
- Möhren, Frankwalt (1997), 'Unité et diversité du champ sémasiologique – l'exemple de l'Anglo-Norman Dictionary', in Gregory, Stewart and Trotter, David (eds), De mot en mot: Essays in honour of William Rothwell, Cardiff, 127–146.
- Möhren, Frankwalt (2000), 'One-fold lexicography for a manifold problem?', In Trotter (2000a), 157–168.
- Möhren, Frankwalt (2007), Dictionnaire Étymologique de l'Ancien Français: Complément bibliographique 2007, Tübingen, Niemeyer.
- Molinelli, Piera/ Guerini, Federica (2013) (edd.), Plurilinguismo e diglossia nella Tarda Antichità et nel Medio Evo (Traditio et Renovatio, 7), Firenze, Sismel: Edizioni del Galluzzo
- Monfrin, Jacques (1968), La mode de tradition des actes écrits et les études de dialectologie, RLiR 32, 17–47.
- NCA = Stein, Achim / Kunstmann, Pierre / Gleßgen, Martin-D. (ed.) (2010): Nouveau Corpus d'Amsterdam. Corpus informatique de textes littéraires d'ancien français (ca 1150–1350), établi par Anthonij Dees (Amsterdam 1987), Institut für Linguistik/Romanistik, version 2-2, disponible en ligne à l'addresse suivante: https://www.uni-stuttgart.de/lingrom/stein/corpus/#nc
- Nielsen, Hans-Frede and Schǿsler, Lene (eds) (1996), The Origins and Development of Emigrant Languages. Proceedings from the Second Rasmus Rask Colloquium, Odense University, November 1994, Odense.
- O'Donnell, Thomas (2017). "The Gloss to Philippe de Thaon's Comput and the French of England's Beginnings." In The French of Medieval England. Essays in Honour of Jocelyn Wogan-Browne, edd. Thelma Fenster and Carolyn P. Collette, 13–37. Cambridge: D. S. Brewer.
- Pépin, Guilhem. 2009. "Petitions from Gascony. Testimonies of a Special Relationship." In Medieval Petitions. Grace and Grievance, edd. W. Mark Ormrod, Gwilym Dodd, et Anthony Musson, 120–134. York: York Medieval Press/Boydell Press.
- Pfister, Max (1973), Die sprachliche Bedeutung von Paris und der île-de-France vor dem 13. Jahrhundert, Vox Romanica 32, 217–253.
- Pfister, Max (1993), 'Scripta' et 'koinè' en ancien français aux XIIe et XIIIe siècles?, in: Knecht, Pierre/Marzys, Zygmunt (edd.), Écriture, langues communes et normes. Formation spontanée de koinès et standardisation dans la Galloromania et son voisinage, Genève/Neuchâtel, Droz/Faculté des lettres, 17–41.
- Pfister, Max (1999), L'area galloromanza, in: Boitani, Piero/Mancini, Mario/Varvaro, Alberto (edd.), Lo Spazio letterario del Medioevo: 2. Il medioevo volgare: I La produzione del testo, Rome, Salerno, 18–96.
- POPE, Mildred K. (1952), From Latin to Modern French, with especial consideration of Anglo-Norman, Manchester, Manchester University Press.
- Postles, Dave (1995), 'Noms de personnes en langue française dans l'Angleterre du moyen âge', Le Moyen Age, 101, 7–21.
- Richardson, Helen (1940), A Twelfth-Century Anglo-Norman Charter, Bulletin of the John Rylands University Library, 24, 168–172.
- Richter, Michael (1979), Sprache und Gesellschaft im Mittelalter: Untersunchungen zur mündlichen Kommunikation in England von der Mitte des 11. bis zum Beginn des 14. Jahrhunderts. Stuttgart.
- Robson, Charles Alan (1955), Literary language, spoken dialect, and the phonological problem of Old French, Transactions of the Philological Society (1955), 117–180.
- Roques, Gilles. 1997. "Des Interférences picardes dans l'Anglo-Norman Dictionary." In De mot en mot: Essays in honour of William Rothwell, edd. Stewart Gregory and D.A. Trotter, 191–198. Cardiff: MHRA/University of Wales Press.
- Roques, Gilles. 2007. "Les régionalismes dans quelques textes anglo-normands." In Actes du XXIVe Congrès International de Linguistique et de Philologie Romanes, ed. David Trotter, 4, 279–292. Tübingen: Niemeyer.
- Rothwell, William (1968), 'The teaching of French in medieval England', Modern Language Review, 63, 37–46.
- Rothwell, William (1973), 'Où en sont les études d'anglo-normand', Zeitschrift für französische Sprache und Literatur, 83, 195–204.
- Rothwell, William (1976a), 'Medical and botanical terminology from Anglo-Nonnan sources', Zeitschrift für französische Sprache und Literatur, 86, 221–60.
- Rothwell, William (1976b), 'The role of French in thirteenth-century England', Bulletin of the John Rylands University Library of Manchester, 58, 445–66.
- Rothwell, William (1978), 'A quelle époque a-t-on cessé de parler français en Angleterre?' in Mélanges de philologie romane offerts d Charles Camproux (Montpellier, Centre d'estudis occitans), 1075–89.
- Rothwell, William (1979), 'Anglo-French lexical contacts, old and new', Modern Language Review, 74, 287–96.
- Rothwell, William (1980), 'Lexical borrowing in a medieval context', Bulletin of the John Rylands University Library of Manchester, 63, 118–43.
- Rothwell, William (1983), 'Language and government in medieval England', Zeitschrift für französische Sprache und Literatur, 93, 258–70.
- Rothwell, William (1985a), 'From Latin to Modern French: fifty years on', Bulletin of the John RyIands University Library of Manchester, 68, 179–209.
- Rothwell, William (1985b), 'Stratford atte Bowe and Paris', Modern Language Review, 80, 39–54.
- Rothwell, William (1991), 'The missing link in English etymology: Anglo-French', Medium Aevum, 60, 173–96.
- Rothwell, William (1992), 'Chaucer and Stratford atte Bowe', Bulletin of the John Rylands University Library of Manchester, 74, 3–28.
- Rothwell, William (1993a), 'The Legacy of Anglo-French: faux amis in French and English', Zeitschrift für romanische Philologie, 109: 16–46.
- Rothwell, William (1993b), 'The 'Faus franceis d'Angleterre': later Anglo-Norman', In Short, Ian (ed.) Anglo-Norman Anniversary Essays, London, 309–326.
- Rothwell, William (1993c), 'From Latin to Anglo-French and Middle English: the role of the multi-lingual gloss', Modern Language Review, 88, 581–99.
- Rothwell, William (1994), 'The trilingual England of Geoffrey Chaucer', Studies in the Age of Chaucer, 16, 45–67.
- Rothwell, William (1996a), 'Adding insult to injury: the English who curse in borrowed French', in Nielsen/Schǿsler (1996), 41–54.
- Rothwell, William (1996b), 'Playing follow my leader in Anglo-Norman studies', Journal of French Language Studies, 6, 177–210.
- Rothwell, William (1996c), 'The Anglo-French element in the vulgar register of Late Middle English', Neuphilologische Mitteilungen, 97, 423–36.
- Rothwell, William (1999), 'Sugar and Spice and All Things Nice: From Oriental Bazar to English Cloister in Anglo-French', Modern Language Review 94, 647–659.
- Rothwell, William (1999b), 'Aspects of lexical and morphosyntactical mixing in the languages of medieval England'. In Trotter (2000a).
- Rothwell, William (2000), 'The Trial Scene in Lanval and the Development of the Legal Register in Anglo-Norman', Neuphilologische Mitteilungen 101, 17–36.
- Rothwell, William (2001a), 'Stratford atte Bowe Revisited', Chaucer Review 36, 184–207.
- Rothwell, William (2001b) 'English and French in England after 1362', English Studies 82, 539–559.
- Rothwell, William (2001c), 'Arrivals and departures: the adoption of French terminology into Middle English', in English Studies, 144–165.
- Rothwell, William (2001d), 'OED, MED, AND: the making of a new dictionary of English', Anglia, Zeitschrift für Englische Philologie 119, 527–553.
- Rothwell, William (2002), 'The semantic field of Old French Astele: the pitfalls of the medieval gloss in lexicography', Journal of French Language Studies 12, 203–220.
- Rothwell, William (2004) 'Henry of Lancaster and Geoffrey Chaucer: Anglo-French and Middle English in Fourteenth-Century England', Modern Language Review 99, 313–27.
- Rothwell, William (2005b) 'The Problem of the English Dribble, Drivel, Drizzle and Trickle: The Role of Semantics in Etymology', Anglia: Zeitschrift für Englische Philologie 123, 191–203.
- Rothwell, William (2006) 'Anglo-French and English Society in Chaucer's The Reeve's Tale, English Studies: A Journal of English Language and Literature 87, 511–38.
- Rothwell, William (2007) 'Synonymity and Semantic Variability in Medieval French and Middle English', Modern Language Review 102:2, 363–80.
- Rothwell, William (2008) 'Anglo-French in Rural England in the Later Thirteenth Century: Walter of Bibbesworth's Tretiz and the Agricultural Treatises', Vox Romanica 67, 100–132.
- Rothwell, William [2005a], 'Anglo-French and the AND', .
- Ruelle, Pierre (1999), Recueil général des isopets. Tome quatrième: Les Fables d'Eude de Cheriton, Paris, Société des Anciens Textes Français.
- Schauweker, Yela (2007), Die Diätetik nach dem Secretum secretorum in der Version von Jofroi de Waterford. Teiledition und lexikalische Analyse, Würzburg, Königshausen & Neumann.
- Schendl, Herbert (1999), 'Linguistic aspects of code-switching in medieval English texts'. In Trotter (2000a).
- Schwan, Eduard/Behrens, Dietrich (1932), Grammaire de l'ancien français, Troisième partie: Matériaux pour servir d'introduction à l'étude des dialectes de l'ancien français, Leipzig, Reisland [traduction par Oscar Bloch de la 12e édition de l'original allemand: Grammatik des Altfranzösischen. Laut- und Formenlehre, Leipzig, Reisland, 1888].
- Selig, Maria (2008), Koineisierung im Altfranzösischen? Dialektmischung, Verschriftlichung und Überdachung im französischen Mittelalter, in: Heinemann, Sabine/Videsott, Paul (edd.), Sprachwandel und (Dis-)Kontinuität in der Romania, Tübingen, Niemeyer, 71–85.
- Sharpe, Richard (2012), Peoples and languages in eleventh- and twelfth-century Britain and Ireland: reading the charter evidence, in: Broun, David (ed.), The Reality behind Charter Diplomatic in Anglo-Norman Britain, disponible en ligne: https://paradox.poms.ac.uk/redist/pdf/chapter1.pdf.
- Short, Ian (1980), 'On Bilingualism in Anglo Norman England', Romance Philology, 33, 467 79.
- Short, Ian (1992), Patrons and Polyglots: French Literature in Twelfth-Century England, Anglo-Norman Studies 14, 327–349.
- Short, Ian (1995), 'Tam Angli quam Franci: Self-definition in Anglo-Norman England', Anglo-Norman Studies xviii, 153–175.
- Short, Ian (2007), Manual of Anglo-Norman (ANTS, Occasional Publications Series, 7; London: Anglo-Norman Text Society).
- Stanovaïa, Lydia (2003), La standardisation en ancien français, in: Goyens/Verbeke (2003), 241–272.
- Studer, Paul (1920). The study of Anglo-Norman: Inaugural lecture delivered before the University of Oxford on 6 February 1920 . Oxford: Clarendon Press.
- Tiddeman, Megan (2012). "Mercantile multilingualism: two examples of Anglo-Norman and Italian contact in the fourteenth century." In Present and future research in Anglo-Norman: Proceedings of the Aberystwyth Colloquium, 21–22 July 2011, ed. David Trotter, 91–99. Aberystwyth: Anglo-Norman Online Hub.
- Trotter, David (1994), 'L'anglo-français au Pays de Galles: une enquête préliminaire', Revue de linguistique romane, 58: 461–88.
- Trotter, David (1996), 'Language contact and lexicography: the case of Anglo Norman', in Nielsen/Schǿsler (1996), 21–39.
- Trotter, David (1997), 'Mossenhor, fet metre aquesta letra en bon francés: Anglo-French in Gascony', in Gregory, Stewart and Trotter, David (eds), De mot en mot: Essays in honour of William Rothwell, Cardiff, 199–222.
- Trotter, David (1998b), 'Les néologismes de l'anglo-français et le FEW', Le Moyen Français 39–41, 577–636.
- Trotter, David (1998c), 'Some Lexical Gleanings from Anglo-French Gascony', Zeitschrift für romanische Philologie 114, 53–72.
- Trotter, David (1998d), 'Translations and loanwords: some Anglo-Norman evidence', In Ellis, R., Tixier, R. and Weitmeier, B. (eds), The Medieval Translator 6: Proceedings of the International Conference of Göttingen (22–25 July 1996), Louvain-la-Neuve, 20–39.
- Trotter, David (2000a), Multilingualism in Later Medieval Britain: Proceedings of the 1997 Aberystwyth Colloquium, Cambridge.
- Trotter, David (2000b), 'L'avenir de la lexicographie anglo-normande: vers une refonte de l'Anglo-Norman Dictionary?', Revue de linguistique romane, 64 (2000), 391–407.
- Trotter, David (2000c), 'Anglo-Norman', in Glanville Price (ed.), Languages of the British Isles (Oxford: Blackwell), 197–206.
- Trotter, David (2003a), L'Anglo-normand: variété insulaire, ou variété isolée?, Médiévales, 45, 43–54.
- Trotter, David (2003b), 'The Anglo-French lexis of the Ancrene Wisse: a re-evaluation', in A Companion to 'Ancrene Wisse', ed. Yoko Wada (Cambridge: Boydell & Brewer, 2003), 83–101
- Trotter, David (2003c), 'Langues en contact en Gascogne médiévale', in Actas del XXIII Congreso Internacional de Lingüística y Filología Románica, Salamanca, 2001, III. Tübingen.
- Trotter, David (2003d), 'Not as eccentric as it looks: Anglo-Norman and French French', Forum for Modern Language Studies, 39, 427–438.
- Trotter, David (2003e), 'Oceano vox: you never know where a ship comes from. On multilingualism and language-mixing in medieval Britain', in Kurt Braunmüller & Gisella Ferraresi (eds.), Aspects of Multilingualism in European Language History (Amsterdam: John Benjamins), 18–33.
- Trotter, David (2006a) 'Language Contact, Multilingualism, and the Evidence Problem', in: Schaefer, U. (ed.), The Beginnings of Standardization: Language and Culture in Fourteenth-Century England (Frankfurt: Peter Lang, 2006), 73–90.
- Trotter, David (2006b) 'Si le français n'y peut aller: Villers Cotterêts and mixed language documents from the Pyrenees', in: COWLING, D.J. (ed.), Conceptions of Europe in Renaissance France: a Festschrift for Keith Cameron (Amsterdam: Rodopi, 2006), 77–97.
- Trotter, David (2008), L'Anglo-normand en France: les traces documentaires, Académie des Inscriptions & Belles-Lettres: Comptes rendus des séances de l'année 2008, avril-juin, II, 893–904.
- Trotter, David (2009), 'English in Contact: Middle English creolization', in A. Bergs/L. Brinton (eds.), Historical Linguistics of English (Berlin: Mouton de Gruyter, 2012), 2, 1781–1793.
- Trotter, David (2010): Bridging the Gap: The (Socio-)linguistic Evidence of Some Medieval English Bridge Accounts. In: Ingham (2010), 52–62.
- Trotter, David (2011a), 'Il sount aliens: marchands étrangers et contact linguistique en Angleterre au Moyen Âge', in W. Schweickard/A. Overbeck/H. Völker (eds.), Lexikon, Varietät, Philologie: Romanistische Studien Günter Holtus zum 65. Geburtstag (Berlin: De Gruyter, 2011), 307–315.
- Trotter, David (2011b), 'L'anglo-normand et le français, et les emprunts en anglais', Actes du colloque international 'Les emprunts lexicaux au français dans les langues européennes', Craiova, 10–12 novembre 2011 (Craiova: Editura Universitaria, 2011), 299–309.
- Trotter, David (2011c), 'Death, taxes and property: some code-switching evidence from Dover, Southampton, and York', in H. Schendl/L. Wright (eds.), Code-Switching in Early English (Berlin: de Gruyter, 2011), 155–189.
- Trotter, David (2011d), 'Intra-textual multilingualism and diaphasic/diastratic variation in Anglo-Norman', in Elizabeth Tyler (ed.), Conceptualizing Multilingualism in England, 800–1250, University of York, July 2006 (Amsterdam: Brepols, 2011), 357–368.
- Trotter, David (2011e), 'Italian merchants in London and Paris: evidence of language contact in the Gallerani accounts, 1305–08', in D. Lagorgette/T. Pooley (eds.), On linguistic change in French: socio-historical approaches. Le changement linguistique en français: aspects socio-historiques Studies in Honour of R. Anthony Lodge. Etudes en hommage au Professeur R. Anthony Lodge (Chambéry: Presses Universitaires de Savoie, 2011), 209–226.
- Trotter, David (2011f), 'Bytes, words, texts: the Anglo-Norman Dictionary and its text-base', in Christine McWebb/Helen Swift (eds.), Selected Proceedings of the "Third International Margot Conference, The Digital Middle Ages: Teaching and Research, special issue of Digital Medievalist, summer 2011, at https://web.archive.org/web/20140311153723/http://www.digitalmedievalist.org/journal/7/trotter/.
- Trotter, David (2012a): Saunz desbriser de hay ou de clos: clos(e) in Anglo-French and in English. In: Claudia Lange/Beatrix Weber/Göran Wolf (eds.), Communicative Spaces: Variation, Contact, and Change: Papers in Honour of Ursula Schaefer, Frankfurt: Peter Lang, 197–214.
- Trotter, David (2012b): L'anglo-normand dans le Middle English Dictionary. In: Stephen Dörr/Thomas Städtler (eds.), Ki bien voldreit raisun entendre: Mélanges en l'honneur du 70e anniversaire de Frankwalt Möhren, Strasbourg: Éditions de Linguistique et de Philologie, 323–337.
- Trotter, David (2013a): Une rencontre germano-romane dans la Romania Britannica. In: Emili Casanova Herrero/Cesáro Calvo Rigual (edd.), Actas del XXVI Congreso Internacional de Lingüística y de Filología Románicas, Berlin: De Gruyter, I, 441–456.
- Trotter, David (2013b): L'anglo-normand à la campagne. In: Comptes-rendus de l'Académie des Inscriptions 2012, II (avril-juin), 1113–1131.
- Trotter, David (à paraître a) 'Trové l'avum mis en tiste: comment réduire notre ignorance du lexique de l'anglo-normand', in Oreste Floquet/Gabriele Giannini (eds.), Anglo-Français: linguistique et philologie/Anglo-francese: filologia e linguistica (Paris: Garnier).
- Trotter, David (à paraître b): Tout feu tout flamme: le FEW et l'anglais few. Dans un volume de mélanges.
- Trotter, David (à paraître c): Noms de lieux, lieux des noms: l'influence Anglo-normande dans la toponymie anglaise. Dans un volume de mélanges.
- Trotter, David (à paraître d), Trop fidèle pour être belle: l'édition historique en Anglo-normand, dans un volume de mélanges.
- Upward, Christopher; Davidson, George (2011). The History of English Spelling. England. ISBN 978-1-4443-4297-0. Archived from the original on 26 April 2025.
- Ureland, P. Sture (ed.) (1991), Language Contact in the British Isles, Tübingen.
- Van Acker, Marieke (2010), La transition Latin / langues romanes et la notion de «diglossie», ZrP 126, 1–38.
- Videsott, Paul (2013), Les débuts du français à la Chancellerie royale: analyse scriptologique des chartes de Philippe III (1270–1285), RLiR 77, 3–50.
- Vising, Johan (1923), Anglo Norman Language and Literature, London.
- Völker, Harald (2000), Chartes luxembourgeoises du XIIIe siècle: Scripta régionale, locale ou «individuelle»?, in: Actes du XXIIe Congrès International de Linguistique et de Philo¬logie Romanes, Bruxelles, 23–29 juillet 1998, Tübingen, Niemeyer, 2000, 5, 159–166.
- Weiner, Edmund S.C. (2000), 'Medieval multilingualism and the revision of the OED'. In TROTTER (2000a), 169–174.
- Woledge, Brian (1970), Un scribe champenois devant un texte normand: Guiot copiste de Wace, in: Mélanges de langue et de littérature du Moyen Âge et de la Renaissance offerts à Jean Frappier, Genève, Droz, 2, 1139–1154.
- Wright, Laura (1996), Sources of London English: Medieval Thames Vocabulary. Oxford.
- Wüest, Jakob (1979), La dialectalisation de la Gallo-Romania. Études phonologiques, Berne, Francke.
- Wüest, Jakob (2001), Sind Schreibdialekte phonologisch interpretierbar? in: Holtus/Rapp/Völker (2001), 37–51.
- Wüest, Jakob (2003), Le rapport entre la langue parlée et la langue écrite: les scriptae dans le domaine d'oïl et le domaine d'oc, in: Goyens/Verbeke (2003), 51–70.**
