= Joe Rayment (footballer, born 1906) =

English footballer (1906–1969)

Personal information
- Full name: Joseph Watson Rayment
- Date of birth: 17 January 1906
- Place of birth: Hartlepool, England
- Date of death: 1969 (aged 62–63)
- Position: Outside right

Senior career*
Years	Team	Apps	(Gls)
- West Hartlepool Perseverance
1927–1928	Hartlepools United	19	(2)
- West Hartlepool Perseverance
- Hartlepool Gas & Water
- * Club domestic league appearances and goals

Joseph Watson Rayment (17 January 1906 – 1969) was an English footballer who made 19 appearances in the Football League playing as an outside right for Hartlepools United in the 1927–28 season. He also played local football in the Hartlepool area. Rayment's son, also called Joe, made 260 appearances for Football League teams in the north-east of England, also playing on the right wing.
