= Joe Rayment (footballer, born 1934) =

English footballer (1934–2019)

Personal information
- Full name: Joseph Watson Rayment
- Date of birth: 25 September 1934
- Place of birth: West Hartlepool, England
- Date of death: 15 July 2019 (aged 84)
- Place of death: Stockton-on-Tees, England
- Height: 5 ft 4 1/2 in (1.64 m)
- Position: Right winger

Youth career
- Middlesbrough

Senior career*
Years	Team	Apps	(Gls)
1952–1955	Middlesbrough	24	(4)
1955–1958	Hartlepools United	63	(17)
1958–1965	Darlington	173	(28)
1965–1966	Gateshead		
- * Club domestic league appearances and goals

Joseph Watson Rayment (25 September 1934 – 15 July 2019) was an English footballer who scored 49 goals from 260 appearances in the Football League playing as a right winger for Middlesbrough, Hartlepools United and Darlington in the 1950s and 1960s.

== Life and career ==
Rayment was born in West Hartlepool, County Durham. His father, also called Joe, had played football for Hartlepools United in the 1920s. Rayment began his football career as a youngster with First Division club Middlesbrough, while doing an electrical engineering apprenticeship at a local company. Having spent the 1951–52 season in the fourth team, and beginning the 1952–53 in the third eleven, Rayment made his first-team debut on 20 September 1952, at the age of 17, in a 4–1 defeat away to Liverpool. Middlesbrough's manager suggested the club would be abandoning their policy of paying big transfer fees to concentrate instead on producing home-grown players, and wanted Rayment to commit to the club as a full-time player, but his reluctance to abandon his apprenticeship prevented him from so doing.

By the start of the 1954–55 season, new manager Bob Dennison reportedly had "great hopes" of the club's youngsters, Rayment included, but his engineering employer sacked him for losing too much time to his football commitments. A company spokesman said that although staff participation in sport was encouraged, "there is a limit and he must make up his mind whether he wants to be one thing or another." Rayment himself said he had tried to do his best for both parties, but because the apprenticeship was important to him, he left Middlesbrough and joined Hartlepools United, where he was able to complete his final year with a local firm.

His Hartlepools career was also interrupted by the requirement for National Service. Rayment served with a Royal Engineers bomb disposal squad based in Sussex, more than 300 miles (480 km) distant. He was able to appear for the club when military duties permitted. Over three years with Hartlepools, he scored 17 goals from 65 matches in League and FA Cup, and signed as a full-time professional for local rivals Darlington in 1958.

In the inaugural season of the League Cup competition, Rayment made a significant contribution to Darlington reaching the third round, and coming close to taking First Division Bolton Wanderers to a replay. In the first round, Rayment scored the only goal of the first-round match against Crystal Palace after missing several chances. In the next round they beat First Division club West Ham United 3–2: Rayment scored the second and debutant Lance Robson, then a dental student, the winner. In front of a club record attendance of 21,023, Rayment opened the scoring after 16 minutes of the third round, against Bolton, with what the Guardian's reporter called "a terrific shot", but the First Division side, with England international Nat Lofthouse at centre forward, came back to win 2–1 in the last seconds of the match.

Rayment remained with Darlington for seven seasons. He scored 28 goals from 173 league appearances, all in the Fourth Division. He finished his football career with a season at Gateshead, then playing in the North Regional League. He helped the club reach the second round proper of the 1965–66 FA Cup, in which they lost 4–0 at home to Hull City.

After leaving football, Rayment spent eight years as an engineer in the Merchant Navy. He was married three times. He died in North Tees Hospital, Stockton, in July 2019 at the age of 84.
