= West Saxon dialect =

Dialect of Old English

West Saxon Old English
- Native to: England
- Region: Parts of Southern England
- Ethnicity: Anglo-Saxons
- Language family: Indo-European: Germanic; West Germanic; North Sea Germanic; Anglo-Frisian; Anglic; West Saxon Old English
- Early forms: Proto-Indo-European: Proto-Germanic

Language codes
- ISO 639-3: –

West Saxon is the term applied to the two different dialects Early West Saxon and Late West Saxon with West Saxon being one of the four distinct regional dialects of Old English. The three others were Kentish, Mercian and Northumbrian (the latter two were similar and are known as the Anglian dialects). West Saxon was the language of the kingdom of Wessex, and was the basis for successive widely used literary forms of Old English: the Early West Saxon of Alfred the Great's time, and the Late West Saxon of the late 10th and 11th centuries. Due to the Saxons' establishment as a politically dominant force in the Old English period, the West Saxon dialects became the strongest dialects in Old English manuscript writing.

== Early West Saxon ==
Early West Saxon was the language employed by King Alfred (849–899), used in the many literary translations produced under Alfred's patronage (and some by Alfred himself). It is often referred to as Alfredian Old English, or Alfredian. The language of these texts nonetheless sometimes reflects the influence of other dialects besides that of Wessex.

List of texts:

1. King Alfred's Preface to Gregory's Pastoral Care
2. The Old English translation of Orosius's Historia adversus paganos
3. Cambridge, Corpus Christi College, MS 173: The Parker Chronicle (The Anglo-Saxon Chronicle)

== Late West Saxon ==
By the time of the Norman conquest of England in 1066, the language had evolved into Late West Saxon, which had established itself as a written language and replaced the Alfredian language, following the Athewoldian language reform set in train by Bishop Æthelwold of Winchester. The name most associated with that reform is that of Abbot Ælfric of Eynsham, Ælfric the Grammarian. Despite their similarities, Late West Saxon is not considered by some to be a direct descendant of Early West Saxon.

Late West Saxon was the dialect that became the first standardised written "English" ("Winchester standard"), sometimes referred to as "classical" Old English. This dialect was spoken mostly in the south and west around the important monastery at Winchester, which was also the capital city of the Saxon kings. However, while other Old English dialects were still spoken in other parts of the country, it seems that all scribes wrote and copied manuscripts in this prestigious written form. Well-known poems recorded in this language include Beowulf and Judith. However, both these poems appear to have been written originally in other Old English dialects, but later translated into the standard Late West Saxon literary language when they were copied by scribes.

In the Wessex Gospels from around 990, the text of Matthew 6 (Matthew 6:9–13), the Lord's Prayer, is as follows:

Fæder ure þu þe eart on heofonum,
si þin nama gehalgod.
To becume þin rice,
gewurþe ðin willa,
on eorðan swa swa on heofonum.
Urne gedæghwamlican hlaf syle us todæg,
and forgyf us ure gyltas,
swa swa we forgyfað urum gyltendum.
And ne gelæd þu us on costnunge,
ac alys us of yfele.
Soþlice. List of texts:

1. Ælfric of Eynsham's Lives of the Saints

== Later developments ==
The "Winchester standard" gradually fell out of use after the Norman Conquest in 1066. Monasteries did not keep the standard going because English bishops were soon replaced by Norman bishops who brought their own Latin textbooks and scribal conventions, and there was less need to copy or write in Old English. Latin soon became the dominant language of scholarship and legal documents, with Anglo-Norman as the language of the aristocracy, and any standard written English became a distant memory by the mid-twelfth century as the last scribes, trained as boys before the conquest in West Saxon, died as old men.

The new standard languages that would come into being in the times of Middle English and Modern English were descended from the East Midlands dialect, which was Anglian, and not from West Saxon. Late West Saxon is the distant ancestor of West Country English.

== See also ==
- Wiktionary's coverage of West Saxon terms
- Wiktionary's coverage of Early West Saxon terms
- Wiktionary's coverage of Late West Saxon terms
