= Old Norman =

Historical language spoken in northern France

- Duchy of Normandy between 911 and 1050. In blue the areas of intense Norse settlement.
- Region: Normandy
- Era: Early Middle Ages, Developed into Norman
- Language family: Indo-European: Italic; Latino-Faliscan; Latinic; Romance; Italo-Western; Western; Gallo-Iberian; Gallo-Romance; Gallo-Rhaetian?; Arpitan–Oïl; Oïl; Old Norman
- Early forms: Old Latin: Vulgar Latin; Proto-Romance; Old Gallo-Romance

Language codes
- ISO 639-3: –

Old Norman, also called Old Northern French or Old Norman French (Norman: Ancien Normaund), was one of many varieties of the langues d'oïl native to northern France. From the region of what is now called Normandy, the language spread into England, Southern Italy, Sicily and the Levant. It is the ancestor of modern Norman, including the insular dialects (such as Jèrriais), as well as Anglo-Norman. Old Norman was an important language of the Principality of Antioch during Crusader rule in the Levant.

== History ==
When Norse Vikings from modern day Scandinavia arrived in Neustria, in the western part of the then Kingdom of the Franks, and settled the land that became known as Normandy, these North-Germanic–speaking people came to live among a local Gallo-Romance–speaking population. In time, the communities converged, so that Normandy continued to form the name of the region while the original Norsemen were largely assimilated by the Gallo-Romance people, adopting their speech but still contributing some elements from Old Norse language and Norse culture.

Old Norman contained Old Norse loanwords unknown in other Old French dialects at that time.

Old Norman was brought to England by William the Conqueror and his followers in what became known as the Norman Conquest, forming the ruling class of Anglo-Normans. Over time, their language evolved from the continental Old Norman to a dialect of Old Norman called Anglo-Norman.

Writings of the Jersey-born poet Wace are among the few records of Old Norman that remain.
