= Comparison of General American and Received Pronunciation =

Differences in pronunciation between British and American standard English

One aspect of the differences between American and British English is that of specific word pronunciations, as described in American and British English pronunciation differences. However, there are also differences in some of the basic pronunciation patterns between the standard dialects of each country. The standard varieties for each are in fact generalizations: for the U.S., a loosely defined spectrum of unmarked varieties called General American (abbreviated "GA") and, for Britain, a collection of prestigious varieties most common in southeastern England, ranging from upper- to middle-class Received Pronunciation accents, which together here are abbreviated "RP". However, other regional accents in each country also show differences, for which see regional accents of English speakers.

Received Pronunciation has been the subject of many academic studies, and is frequently used as a model for teaching English to foreign learners. The widely repeated claim that only about two percent of Britons speak RP is no more than a rough estimate and has been questioned by several writers, most notably by the phonetician Jack Windsor Lewis.

== Phonological differences ==
- Rhoticity – GA is rhotic while RP is non-rhotic; that is, the phoneme /r/ is only pronounced in RP when it is immediately followed by a vowel sound. Where GA pronounces /r/ before a consonant and at the end of an utterance, RP either has no consonant (if the preceding vowel is /ɔː/, /ɜ:/ or /ɑː/, as in bore, burr and bar) or has a schwa instead (the resulting sequences being diphthongs or triphthongs). This leads to several RP mergers characteristic of non-rhotic accents, whereas GA maintains these distinctions. Similarly, where GA has r-colored vowels (/ər/ or /ɜr/, as in "cupboard" or "bird"), RP has plain vowels /ə/ or /ɜː/. The "intrusive R" of many RP speakers (in such sequences as "the idea-r-of it") is absent in GA; this is a consequence of the rhotic/non-rhotic distinction.
- The trap–bath split has resulted in RP having the back unrounded open vowel /ɑː/ in many words where GA has a front open unrounded vowel /æ/; this RP vowel occurs typically (but not always) when followed by:
  - /nt/, /ntʃ/, /ns/, /s/, /f/, or /θ/ (e.g. aunt, branch, chance, pass, laugh, path).
- /æ/ is usually tensed before /m/, /n/, and sometimes /ŋ/ in GA; in other words, rap is [ɹæp] but ram is [ɹɛəm].
- Many foreign names and loanwords spelled with ⟨a⟩ use /æ/ in RP but /ɑː/ in GA, such as kebab, pasta, macho, and taco. In a small number of words, these phonemes are exactly reversed in the two dialects, such as banana, khaki, and Pakistan.
- RP has three open back vowels, where GA has only two or even one. GA speakers use /ɑ/ for both the RP /ɒ/ (spot) and /ɑː/ (spa): the father–bother merger.
  - Nearly half of American speakers additionally use the same vowel for the RP /ɔː/ (the cot–caught merger).
- While the lot–cloth split is no longer found in RP, it is found in those GA speakers who do not have the cot–caught merger (which otherwise neutralizes this split). This results in /ɔ/ in some words which now have /ɒ/ in RP, particularly before voiceless fricatives and sometimes before /ɡ/ (where it is always /ɒ/ in RP, both older and contemporary). This is reflected in the "eye dialect" spelling "dawg" for dog.
- "Long o" and "short o" before intervocalic /r/ have merged in American English. Thus "moral" and "oral" rhyme in GA (/ˈ(m)ɔrəl/), while in RP they do not rhyme, being pronounced /ˈmɒrəl/ and /ˈɔːrəl/, respectively.
- RP has a marked degree of contrast of length between "short" and "long" vowels (the long vowels being the diphthongs plus /iː/, /uː/, /ɜː/, /ɔː/, and /ɑː/). In GA this contrast is somewhat less evident and non-phonemic, so the IPA length symbol (ː) is often omitted.
- The "long o" (as in boat) is realised differently: GA back first element [oʊ]; RP central first element [əʊ]. However, there is considerable variation in this vowel on both sides of the Atlantic.
- The distinction between unstressed /ɪ/ and /ə/ is usually lost in GA, while in RP it is retained. Thus in RP, edition /ɪˈdɪʃən/ and addition /əˈdɪʃən/ are not homophones.
- In GA, flapping is common: when either a /t/ or a /d/ occurs between a sonorant phoneme and an unstressed vowel phoneme, it is realized as an alveolar-flap allophone [ɾ]. This sounds like a /d/ to RP speakers. [ɾ] is an allophone of /r/ in conservative RP. The degree of flapping varies considerably among speakers, and is often reduced in more formal settings. It does occur to an extent in nearly all speakers of American English, with better pronounced with a flap almost ubiquitously regardless of background. Pronouncing the t would be considered overly formal. This does not mean it always completely merges with bedder, as /ɛ/ in the latter can be somewhat longer than in better.
- Yod-dropping occurs in GA at the onset of stressed syllables after all alveolar consonants, including /t/, /d/, /θ/, /s/, /z/, /n/, /l/; i.e. historic /juː/ (from spellings u, ue, eu, ew), is pronounced /u/. In contrast, RP speakers:
  - always retain /j/ after /n/: e.g. new is RP /njuː/, GA /nu/;
  - retain or coalesce it after /t/, /d/: e.g. due is RP /djuː/ or /dʒuː/, GA /du/;
  - retain or drop it after /θ/, /l/: e.g. allude is RP /əˈljuːd/ or (as GA) /əˈlud/;
  - retain, coalesce in stressed or unstressed syllables, or drop it after /s/, /z/: e.g. assume is RP /əˈsjuːm/, or (as GA) /əˈsum/.
- RP speakers also pronounce coupon and Pulitzer without yod (as in original French and German) as /ˈkuːpɒn/ and /ˈpʊlɪtsə/ respectively, but many GA speakers insert it, pronouncing /ˈkjuːpɒn/ and /ˈpjuːlɪtsər/, although Pulitzer with the yod is widely considered incorrect.
- Yod-coalescence occur in both GA and RP in unstressed syllables or after a stressed vowel. RP however more often retains the yod, especially in carefully enunciated forms of words. For example, issue is RP /ˈɪsjuː/ or (as GA) /ˈɪʃu/, graduate may be carefully enunciated in RP as /ˈɡradjʊeɪt/, but nature is always coalesced /ˈneɪtʃə(r)/. In both GA and RP, however, the sounds of word-final /d/, /s/, /t/, and /z/ (spelled either s or z) can coalesce with the sound of word-initial /j/ (spelled u or y) across word boundaries in casual or rapid speech, becoming /dʒ/, /ʃ/, /tʃ/, and /ʒ/ respectively, thus this year (/ˈðɪʃɪə(r)/) can sound like thi(s) shear/sheer. This is also found in other English accents.
- For some GA speakers from any U.S. region whose accents are derived from, or similar to, those that originate especially in California, other Western states, and even Midwestern areas, including the Upper Midwest, the unstressed I in -ing (/ɪŋ/) is tensed (i.e., raised) and the G is dropped, so that -ing is enunciated to sound like ean (as in mean), een, or ene (as in scene; [in]), thus coding is similar to codeine (/ˈkoʊdin/), akin to how "in" is typically pronounced by speakers from Australia, where the target for /ɪ/ is closer to cardinal [i], or Romance languages-speaking countries like France and Spain, whether as a standalone word or a syllable, but shorter than the long vowel of bean or the traditional RP pronunciation of been ([iːn]). However, this pronunciation is considered incorrect, but it had already been widespread in American television as early as 1990 and was described in that year's Orlando Sentinel article as a "corruption of the language" so that it has been either unconventional or nonexistent in RP.
- For some RP speakers (upper class), unlike in GA, some or all of tyre (tire), tower, and tar are homophones; this reflects the merger of the relevant vowels.
- The voiceless stops /t/, /p/, and /k/ have a stronger aspiration in RP.
- Most General American accents, but not British ones, have undergone vowel mergers before /r/: the nearer–mirror and hurry–furry mergers, and some variation of the Mary–marry–merry merger, a total three-way merger being the most common throughout North America.
- GA accents usually have some degree of merging weak vowels.
- Disyllabic laxing is more common in American than in British English, with a short vowel in GA and a long vowel in RP in such words as era, patent and lever.
- Trisyllabic laxing however is somewhat less common in GA than in RP, for example in privacy, vitamin and spherical.

== See also ==
- Phonological history of English § Changes by time period from after American-British split to after World War II
- American and British English pronunciation differences
- Sound correspondences between English accents
- General American English
- Received Pronunciation

== Bibliography ==
- Collins, Beverly; Mees, Inger M. (2003). The Phonetics of English and Dutch (5th ed.). Leiden: Brill. ISBN 90-04-10340-6.
- Fowler, H.W. (1996). R.W. Birchfield (ed.). Fowler's Modern English Usage. Oxford University Press. ISBN 978-0-19-869126-6.
- Windsor Lewis, Jack (14 April 2013). "A Notorious Estimate". JWL's Blogs. Archived from the original on 20 February 2025.
- Wells, John C. (1982). Accents of English. Vol. 1: An Introduction (pp. i–xx, 1–278), Vol. 2: The British Isles (pp. i–xx, 279–466), Vol. 3: Beyond the British Isles (pp. i–xx, 467–674). Cambridge University Press. doi:10.1017/CBO9780511611759, doi:10.1017/CBO9780511611766. ISBN 0-52129719-2, 0-52128540-2, 0-52128541-0.
- Wells, John C. (1997). "Whatever happened to Received Pronunciation?". In Medina, Carmelo; Soto, Palomo (eds.). Il Jornadas de Estudios Ingleses. Universidad de Jaén. pp. 19–28.
- Metcalf, Allan (2000). "The Far West and beyond". How We Talk: American Regional English Today. Houghton Mifflin Harcourt. ISBN 0618043624.
- Hunter, Marsha; Johnson, Brian K. (2009). "Articulators and Articulation". The Articulate Advocate: New Techniques of Persuasion for Trial Attorneys. Crown King Books. ISBN 9780979689505.
