= American and British English pronunciation differences =

Pronunciation comparison

Differences in pronunciation between American English (AmE) and British English (BrE) can be divided into

- differences in accent (i.e. phoneme inventory and realisation). See differences between General American and Received Pronunciation for the standard accents in the United States and Britain; for information about other accents see regional accents of English.
- differences in the pronunciation of individual words in the lexicon (i.e. phoneme distribution). In this article, transcriptions use Received Pronunciation (RP) to represent BrE and General American (GAm) to represent AmE.

== Stress ==
Subscript _{a} or _{b} means that the relevant unstressed vowel is also reduced to /ə/ or /ɪ/ in AmE or BrE, respectively.

=== French stress ===
For many loanwords from French, AmE has final-syllable stress, while BrE stresses an earlier syllable or preserves the original French equal stress per syllable.

=== Verbs ending in -ate ===
Most 2-syllable verbs ending in -ate have first-syllable stress in AmE and second-syllable stress in BrE. This includes castrate, collate, cremate, curate, dictate, dilate, donate, fixate, frustrate, gestate, gradate, gyrate, hydrate, lactate, locate, mandate, migrate, mutate, narrate_{b}, notate, phonate, placate_{b}, prostrate, pulsate, rotate, serrate, spectate, stagnate, striate, translate, truncate, vacate_{b*}, vibrate. Examples where AmE and BrE match include conflate, create, equate, elate, inflate, negate, sedate; and probate with first-syllable stress. Derived nouns in -ator retain the distinction, but those in -ation do not. Also, migratory and vibratory sometimes retain the distinction.

Most longer -ate verbs are pronounced the same in AmE and BrE, but a few have first-syllable stress in BrE and second-syllable stress in AmE: demarcate_{a}, elongate_{a}, impregnate, incarnate, inculcate, inculpate, infiltrate, remonstrate_{ab}, sequestrate, tergiversate_{a}. (Note: Also /ˌtɜːrdʒiˈvɜːrseɪt/) For some derived adjectives ending -atory stress-shifting to -a(tory)- occurs in BrE. Among these cases are celebratory_{a} (BrE: /ˌsɛlɪˈbreɪtəri/), circulatory_{a}, compensatory_{a}, participatory_{a}, regulatory_{a}. AmE stresses the same syllable as the corresponding -ate verb (except compensatory, where AmE stresses the second syllable). A further -atory difference is laboratory: AmE /ˈlæbərətɔːri/ and BrE /ləˈbɒrətəri/.

=== Miscellaneous stress ===
There are a number of cases where same-spelled noun, verb and/or adjective have uniform stress in one dialect but distinct stress in the other (e.g. alternate, prospect): see initial-stress-derived noun.

== Affixes ==
=== -ary, -ery, -ory, -mony, -ative, -bury, -berry ===
Where the syllable preceding the suffixes -ary, -ery, -ory, -mony or -ative is unstressed, AmE pronounces the penultimate syllable with a full vowel sound: /-ɛri/ for -ary and -ery, /-ɔːri/ for -ory, /-moʊni/ for -mony and /-eɪtɪv/ -ative. BrE reduces the vowel to a schwa or even elides it completely: [-əri] or [-ri] (hereafter transcribed as /-əri/ in diaphonemic transcription), /-məni/ and /-ətɪv/. So military is AmE /ˈmɪlətɛri/ and BrE /ˈmɪlɪtəri/, inventory is AmE /ˈɪnvəntɔːri/ and BrE /ˈɪnvəntəri/, testimony is AmE /ˈtɛstəmoʊni/ and BrE /ˈtɛstɪməni/ and innovative is AmE /ˈɪnoʊveɪtɪv/ or /ˈɪnəveɪtɪv/ and BrE /ˈɪnəvətɪv/. (The elision is avoided in carefully enunciated speech, especially with endings -rary, -rery, -rory.)

Where the syllable preceding -ary, -ery, -ory, -mony or -ative is stressed however, AmE also usually reduces the vowel: /-əri/, /-məni/. Exceptions include library, primary, rosemary. (Pronouncing library as /ˈlaɪbɛri/ rather than /ˈlaɪbrɛri/ is stigmatized in the United States, for example as associated with African-American Vernacular English, whereas in BrE, /ˈlaɪbri/ is common in rapid or casual speech.)

The suffix -berry is pronounced by similar rules, except that in BrE it may be full /-bɛri/ after an unstressed syllable, while in AmE it is usually full in all cases. Thus we have strawberry: BrE /ˈstrɔːbəri/, AmE /ˈstrɔːbɛri/, and whortleberry: BrE/AmE /ˈhwɔːrtəlbɛri/.

The placename component -bury (e.g. Canterbury) has a similar difference: AmE has a full vowel: /-bɛri/ where BrE has a reduced one: /-bəri/.

Stress differences between the dialects occur with some words ending in -atory (listed above) and a few others like capillary (included in #Miscellaneous stress above).

Formerly the BrE–AmE distinction for adjectives carried over to corresponding adverbs ending -arily, -erily or -orily. However, nowadays some BrE speakers adopt the AmE practice of shifting the stress to the penultimate syllable: militarily is thus sometimes /ˌmɪlɪˈtɛrɪli/ rather than /ˈmɪlɪtərəli/, and necessarily is in BrE either /ˈnɛsəsərɪli/ or /ˌnɛsəˈsɛrɪli/.

=== -ile ===
Words ending in unstressed -ile derived from Latin adjectives ending -ilis are mostly pronounced with a full vowel in BrE /aɪl/ but a reduced vowel or syllabic L in AmE /əl/ (e.g. fertile sounds like fur tile in BrE but sounds like furtle in AmE).

AmE will (unlike BrE, except when indicated with) have a reduced last vowel:

- generally in facile, (in)fertile, fissile, fragile, missile, sterile, tensile, versatile, virile, volatile
- often in agile, docile, (Note: AmE also /ˈdɒsəl/) ductile, futile, hostile, juvenile, (im)mobile (adjective and phone), puerile, tactile
- rarely in domicile, (Note: AmE also /ˈdoʊməsəl/) erectile, febrile, (Note: AmE also /ˈfɛbriːl, ˈfɛbrəl/) infantile, nubile, pensile, percentile, projectile, reptile, senile, (Note: AmE also possibly /ˈsɛnaɪl/) servile, textile, utile
- never in crocodile, exile, gentile, reconcile; nor to compounds of monosyllables (e.g. turnstile from stile)

In some words the pronunciation /iːl/ also comes into play:

- BrE /aɪl/, AmE /iːl/: c(h)amomile, mercantile, mobile/stabile (decorations)
- BrE /aɪl/, AmE /ɪl/ or /əl/: motile, prehensile, pulsatile, tractile
- BrE /iːl/, AmE /ɪl/ or /əl/: imbecile
- BrE /ɪl/, AmE /iːl/: rutile (BrE, AmE also /aɪl/)

Related endings -ility, -ilize, -iliary are pronounced the same in AmE as BrE.

=== di- ===
The pronunciation of the vowel of the prefix di- in words such as dichotomy, digest (verb), dilate, dilemma, dilute, diluvial, dimension, direct, dissect, disyllable, divagate, diverge, diverse, divert, divest, and divulge as well as their derivational forms vary between /aɪ/ and /ɪ/ or /ə/ in both British and American English.

=== -ine ===
The suffix -ine when unstressed is pronounced sometimes /aɪn/ (e.g. feline), sometimes /iːn/ (e.g. morphine) and sometimes /ɪn/ (e.g. medicine). Some words have variable pronunciation within BrE, or within AmE, or between BrE and AmE. Generally, AmE is more likely to favor /iːn/ or /ɪn/, and BrE to favor /aɪn/.

BrE /aɪn/, AmE (1) /iːn/: carbine, Florentine, internecine, philistine, pristine (Note: The 2007 update to the Oxford English Dictionary gives only /iːn/ for the British pronunciation of pristine.), saline, serpentine.

BrE /aɪn/, AmE (1) /iːn/ (2) /ɪn/: adamantine.

BrE /aɪn/, AmE /ɪn/: uterine.

BrE /aɪn/, AmE (1) /ɪn/ (2) /aɪn/ (3) /iːn/: crystalline, labyrinthine.

BrE (1) /iːn/, AmE (1) /aɪn/ (2) /ɪn/: strychnine.

=== Effects of the weak vowel merger ===
The weak vowel merger causes affixes such as -ate (as in climate), be- (before a consonant), de- (as in decide), -ed (with a sounded vowel), -es (with a sounded vowel), -est, -less, -ness, pre- (as in prepare) and re- (before a consonant) to be pronounced with the schwa /ə/ (the a in about), rather than the unstressed /ɪ/ (found in the second syllable of locksmith). Conservative RP uses /ɪ/ in each case, so that before, waited, roses and faithless are pronounced /bɪˈfɔːr, ˈweɪtɪd, ˈroʊzɪz, ˈfeɪθlɪs/, rather than /bəˈfɔːr, ˈweɪtəd, ˈroʊzəz, ˈfeɪθləs/, which are more usual in General American. The pronunciations with /ə/ are gaining ground in RP and in the case of certain suffixes (such as -ate and -less) have become the predominant variants. The noun carelessness is pronounced /ˈkɛərləsnəs/ in Standard Southern British and /ˈkɛərlɪsnɪs/ in conservative RP; both pronunciations typically merge in GA (usually towards the latter). This variation is denoted with the symbol ⟨ᵻ⟩ in some of the dictionaries published by Oxford University Press and in the Routledge Dictionary of Pronunciation of Current English. In the latter, the British pronunciation of climate is transcribed ⟨ˈklʌɪmᵻt⟩, though carelessness is transcribed ⟨ˈkɛːləsnəs⟩.

Affixes such as dis-, in-, -ing and mis- contain /ɪ/ in conservative RP as well as General American and Standard Southern British, so that words such as disloyal or teaching are phonemically /dɪsˈlɔɪəl/ and /ˈtiːtʃɪŋ/ in all three varieties.

== Weak forms ==
The title Saint before a person's name has a weak form in BrE but not AmE: before vowels, /sənt/.

== Miscellaneous pronunciation differences ==
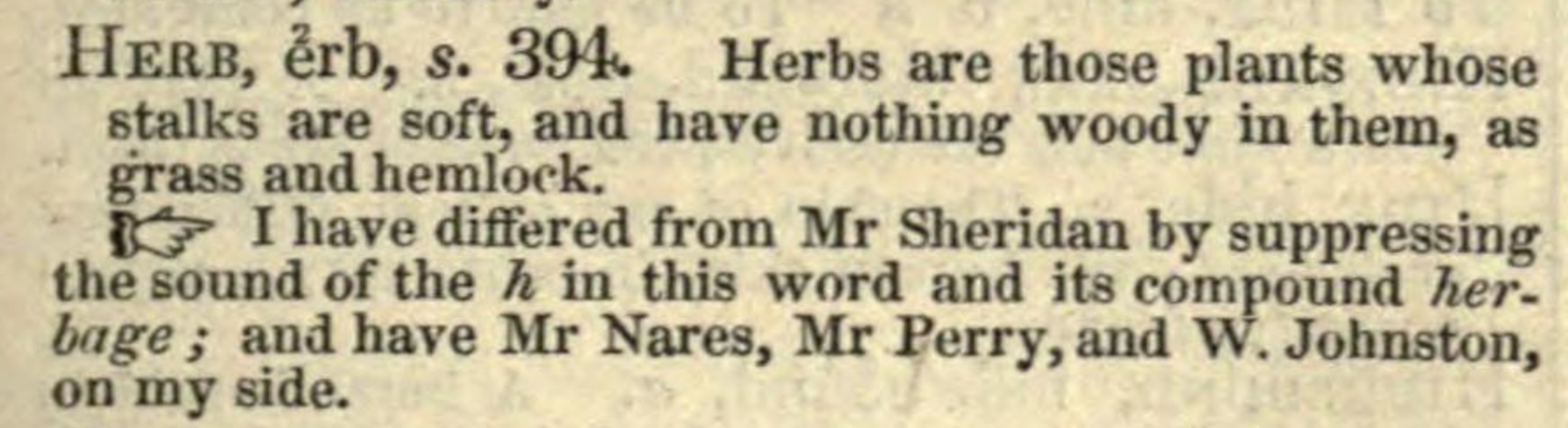
Entry for "Herb" from Walker's Critical Pronouncing Dictionary, (London: Tegg, 1833), showing pronunciation without /h/

See the table of words with different pronunciation reflected in the spelling.

In their respective conventional accent-specific transcription systems, Moscow would be transcribed as RP /ˈmɒskəʊ/ and GAm /ˈmɑskaʊ/, but it is RP /ˈmɒskoʊ/ and GAm /ˈmɒskaʊ/ in the transcription system used in this article. Only the /oʊ/–/aʊ/ difference is highlighted here, since both the presence of a contrastive /ɒ/ vowel in RP (which falls together with /ɑː/ in GA) and the RP use of [əʊ] rather than [oʊ] are predictable from the accent. Also, tiara is listed with AmE /æ/; the marry–merry–Mary merger changes this vowel for many Americans.

Many sources omit the length marks in transcriptions of AmE, so that words such as father or keep are transcribed /ˈfɑðər/ and /ˈkip/ rather than /ˈfɑːðər/ and /ˈkiːp/. Even though it is not phonemic, vowel length in GA works in a very similar manner to RP, so this is mainly a difference in transcription.
