= Phonological history of English =

Sound changes

Like many other languages, English has wide variation in pronunciation, both historically and from dialect to dialect. In general, however, the regional dialects of English share a largely similar (but not identical) phonological system. Among other things, most dialects have vowel reduction in unstressed syllables and a complex set of phonological features that distinguish fortis and lenis consonants (stops, affricates, and fricatives).

This article describes the development of the phonology of English over time, starting from its roots in proto-Germanic to diverse changes in different dialects of modern English.

== Abbreviations ==
In the following description, abbreviations are used as follows:

- C = any consonant
- V = any vowel
- # = end of word
- * = reconstructed
- ** = non-existent
- > = changes into
- >! = changes into, unexpectedly
- < = is derived from
- PreOE = Pre-Old English
- OE = Old English
- EME = Early Middle English
- LME = Late Middle English
- ME = Middle English
- EModE = Early Modern English
- ModE = Modern English
- GA = General American
- RP = Received Pronunciation
- PrePG = Pre-Proto-Germanic
- PG or PGmc = Proto-Germanic
- NWG = Northwest Germanic
- WG = West Germanic
- OHG = Old High German
- MHG = Middle High German
- ModG = Modern German
- PIE = Proto-Indo-European
- Goth = Gothic
- PN = Proto-Norse
- ON = Old Norse
- OEN = Old East Norse
- OWN = Old West Norse
- OS = Old Saxon

== Changes by time period from Late Proto-Germanic to Old English ==
This section summarizes the changes occurring within distinct time periods, covering the last 2,000 years or so. Within each subsection, changes are in approximate chronological order.

The time periods for some of the early stages are quite short due to the extensive population movements occurring during the Migration Period (early AD), which resulted in rapid dialect fragmentation.

=== Late Proto-Germanic period ===
This period includes changes in late Proto-Germanic, up to about the 1st century. Only a general overview of the more important changes is given here; for a full list, see the Proto-Germanic article.

- Word-final /m/ became /n/.
  - Word-final /n/ was then lost after unstressed syllables with nasalization of the preceding vowel. Hence Pre-PGmc *dʰogʰom > early PGmc *dagam > late PGmc *dagą > Old English dæġ "day (acc. sg.)". The nasalisation was retained at least into the earliest history of Old English.
- Word-final /t/ was lost after an unstressed syllable. This followed the loss of word-final /n/, because it remained before /t/: PrePGmc *bʰr̥n̥t > early PGmc *burunt > late PGmc *burun "they carried".
- /e/ was raised to /i/ in unstressed syllables.
  - The original vowel remained when followed by /r/, and was later lowered to /ɑ/.
- Early i-mutation: /e/ was raised to /i/ when an /i/ or /j/ followed in the next syllable.
  - This occurred before deletion of word-final /i/; hence PIE *upéri > early PGmc *uberi > late PGmc *ubiri > German über "over". Compare PIE *upér > early PGmc *uber > late PGmc *ubar > German ober "over".
  - But it occurred after the raising of unstressed /e/ to /i/: PIE *bʰérete > PGmc *berid > *birid "you carry (pl)".
  - This also affected the diphthong /eu/, which became /iu/.
  - As a consequence of this change, /ei/ > /iː/. The Elder Futhark of the Proto-Norse language still contained different symbols for the two sounds.
- z-umlaut: /e/ is raised to /i/ before /z/.
  - Early PGmc *mez "me, dative" > late PGmc *miz > Old High German mir, Old Saxon mi, Old Norse mér (with general lowering and lengthening of i before r).
  - This change was only sporadic at best because there were barely any words in which it could have occurred at all, since /e/ remained only in stressed syllables. The umlauting effect of /z/ remained, however, and in Old West Norse it was extended to other vowels as well. Hence OEN glaʀ, hrauʀ, OWN gler, hreyrr.
- Pre-nasal raising: /e/ > /i/ before nasal + consonant. Pre-PGmc *bʰendʰonom > PGmc *bendaną > *bindaną > OE bindan > ModE bind (Latin of-fendō).
  - This was later extended in Pre-Old English times to vowels before all nasals; hence Old English niman "take" but Old High German neman.
- Loss of /n/ before /x/, with nasalization and compensatory lengthening of the preceding vowel.
  - The nasalization was eventually lost, but remained through the Ingvaeonic period.
  - Hence Pre-PGmc *tongjonom > PGmc *þankijaną > OE þencan > ModE think, but PrePG *tonktos > PGmc *þanhtaz > *þą̄htaz > OE þōht > ModE thought.
  - This change followed the raising of /e/ before a nasal: PGmc *þenhaną > *þinhaną > *þį̄haną > Gothic þeihan.
- Final-syllable short vowels were generally deleted in words of three syllables or more. PGmc *biridi > Goth baíriþ /beriθ/ "(he) carries" (see above), and also PGmc *-maz, *-miz > *-mz (dative and instrumental plural ending of nouns, 1st person plural ending of verbs, as on the Stentoften Runestone).

=== Northwest Germanic period ===
This was the period after the East Germanic languages had split off. Changes during this time were shared with the North Germanic dialects, i.e. Proto-Norse. Many of the changes that occurred were areal, and took time to propagate throughout a dialect continuum that was already diversifying. Thus, the ordering of the changes is sometimes ambiguous, and can differ between dialects.

- Allophonic i-mutation/Germanic umlaut: Short back vowels were fronted when followed in the next syllable by /i/ or /j/, by i-mutation: /ɑ/ > [æ], /u/ > [y]
  - In this initial stage, the mutated vowels were still allophonically conditioned, and were not yet distinct as phonemes. Only later, when the /i/ and /j/ were modified or lost, were the new sounds phonemicized.
  - i-mutation affected all the Germanic languages except for Gothic, although with a great deal of variation. It appears to have occurred earliest, and to be most pronounced, in the Schleswig-Holstein area (the home of the Anglo-Saxons), and from there to have spread north and south. However, it is possible that this change already occurred in Proto-Germanic proper, in which case the phenomenon would have remained merely allophonic for quite some time. If that is the case, that would be the stage reflected in Gothic, where there is no orthographic evidence of i-mutation at all.
  - Long vowels and diphthongs were affected only later, probably analogically, and not in all areas. Notably, they were not mutated in most (western) Dutch dialects, whereas short vowels were.
- a-mutation: /u/ is lowered to /o/ when a non-high vowel follows in the next syllable.
  - This is blocked when followed by a nasal followed by a consonant, or by a cluster with /j/ in it. Hence PG *gulþą > OE/ModE gold, but PG *guldijaną > OE gyldan > ModE gild.
  - This produces a new phoneme /o/, due to inconsistent application and later loss of word-final vowels.
- Final-syllable long vowels were shortened.
  - Word final /ɔː/ becomes /o/, later raised to /u/, but becomes /ɑː/ or /ɑ/ if it is syllable final and precedes a consonant. PG *sagō ("saw (tool)") > OE sagu, ON sǫg. PG *brūnaizōz ("brown", genitive feminine singular) > WG *brūneʀā, ON brúnnar.
  - Final /ɔ̃ː/ becomes /ɑː/ in West Germanic and /ɑ/ in ON. PG *gēbǭ ("gift") > WG *gābā, ON gáfa.
  - Final /ɛː/ becomes /e/ in ON (later raised to /i/), /ɑ/ in West Germanic. PG *hailidē ("he/she/it healed") > ON heilði, but OE hǣlde, OHG heilta.
  - The final long diphthong /ɔːi/ loses its final element and usually develops the same as /ɔː/ from that point on. PG *gebōi ("gift", dative singular) > NWG *gebō > ON gjǫf, OHG gebu, OE giefe (an apparent irregular development).
- "Overlong" vowels were shortened to regular long vowels or short vowels.
  - /ɔːː/ becomes /ɔː/ in West Germanic, and shortens more to become /ɑ/ in ON. PG *gernô ("willingly") > WG *gernō, ON gjarna.
  - /ɔ̃ːː/ denasalizes to plain /ɔː/ in West Germanic, and shortens more to become /ɑ/ in ON. PG *stainǫ̂ ("stone", genitive plural) > WG *stainō, ON steina.
  - /ɛːː/ shortens to /eː/ in West Germanic, and shortens more to become /ɑ/ in ON, possibly having merged with *-ô before the shortening. PG *simlê ("ever") > WG *simlē, ON simla.
- PG /ɛː/ (maybe already /æː/ by late PG) becomes /ɑː/, or /oː/ if it precedes a nasal consonant. This preceded final shortening in West Germanic, but postdated it in North Germanic.
- Unstressed diphthongs were monophthongized. /ɑi/ > /eː/, /ɑu/ > /oː/. The latter merged with ō from shortened overlong ô, as well as pre-existing non-word final /ɔː/. PG *sunauz ("son", genitive singular) > NWG *sunōz > ON sonar, OE suna, OHG suno; PG *nemai ("he/she/it take", subjunctive) > NWG *nemē > ON nemi, OE nime, OHG neme; PG *stainai ("stone", dative singular) > NWG *stainē > ON steini, OE stāne, OHG steine.

=== West Germanic period ===
This period occurred around the 2nd to 4th centuries. It is unclear if there was ever a distinct "Proto-West Germanic", as most changes in this period were areal, and likely spread throughout a dialect continuum that was already diversifying further. Thus, this "period" may not have been a real timespan, but may simply cover certain areal changes that did not reach into North Germanic. This period ends with the further diversification of West Germanic into several groups before and during the Migration Period: Ingvaeonic, Istvaeonic (Old Frankish) and Irminonic (Upper German).

- Labiovelar consonants /kʷ/, /ɡʷ/, and /xʷ/ became clusters /kw/, /ɡw/, and /xw/ respectively. These were later delabialized when not word-initial. Compare PG *kwaljaną ("to kill") > OE cwellan vs PG *stinkwaną ("to stink") > OE stincan.
- Loss of word-final /z/.
  - This change occurred before rhotacization, as original word-final /r/ was not lost.
  - But it must have occurred after the Northwest Germanic split, since word-final /z/ was not eliminated in Old Norse, instead merging with /r/.
  - /z/ was not lost in single-syllable words in southern and central German. Compare PG *miz > OS mi, OE me vs. OHG mir.
  - The OE nominative plural -as (ME -s), OS nominative plural -ōs may be from original accusative plural *-ans, due to the Ingvaeonic Nasal-Spirant law, rather than original nominative plural *-ōz, which would be expected to become *-a (OHG -a, compare ON -ar).
- Rhotacization: /z/ > /r/.
  - This change also affected Proto-Norse, but only much later. /z/ and /r/ were still distinct in the Danish and Swedish dialect of Old Norse, as is testified by distinct runes. (/z/ is normally assumed to be a rhotic fricative in this language, but there is no actual evidence of this.)
  - PG *deuzą > Goth dius; OE dēor > ModE deer
- Intervocalic ðw > ww. PG *fedwōr ("four") > WG *feuwar.
- Fortition: [ð] > [d].
  - /lθ/ > /ld/ medially; in Old English this is extended to word-final position by analogy with inflected forms.
- West Germanic gemination: single consonants followed by /j/ except /r/ became double (geminate). This only affected consonants preceded by a short vowel, because those preceded by a long vowel or by another consonant were never followed by /j/ due to Sievers' law.
  - PG *bidjaną, *habjaną > OE biddan, habban > ModE bid, have

=== Ingvaeonic and Anglo-Frisian period ===
This period is estimated to have lasted only a century or so, the 4th to 5th; the time during which the Franks started to spread south into Gaul (France) and the various coastal people began colonising Britain. Changes in this period affected the Ingvaeonic languages, but not the more southerly Central and Upper German languages. The Ingvaeonic group was probably never homogeneous, but was divided further into Old Saxon and Anglo-Frisian. Old Frankish (and later Old Dutch) was not in the core group, but was affected by the spread of several areal changes from the Ingvaeonic area.

The Anglo-Frisian languages shared several unique changes that were not found in the other West Germanic languages. The migration to Britain caused a further split into early Old English and early Old Frisian.

- Ingvaeonic nasal spirant law: Loss of nasals before fricatives, with nasalization and compensatory lengthening of the preceding vowel. Hence PG *munþaz became ModG Mund but in Ingvaeonic dialects first became *mų̄þa. Old English then denasalised the vowels, giving OE mūþ > ModE "mouth".
  - Following this /ɑ̃ː/ > /õː/. PrePG *donts > PG *tanþs > *tą̄þ > *tǭþ > OE tōþ > ModE "tooth". (ModG Zahn < OHG zant.) This also applied to /ɑ̃ː/ arising earlier in Proto-Germanic: PG *þanhtǭ > Late PG *þą̄htǭ > OE þōhte > ModE "(I) thought".
- Anglo-Frisian brightening:
  - Fronting of /ɑ/ to /æ/ (unless followed by a geminate, by a back vowel in the next syllable, and in certain other cases). Hence OE dæġ /dæj/ "day", plural dagas /dɑɣɑs/ "days" (dialectal ModE "dawes"; compare ModE "dawn" < OE dagung /dɑɣuŋɡ/).
  - This does not affect nasal /ɑ̃/. And since this is a back vowel, /ɑ/ in a preceding syllable was prevented from being fronted as well. This created an alternation between the infinitive in *-aną and strong past participle in *-ana (< PG *anaz), where the former became -an in OE but the latter became *-ænæ > -en.
  - Fronting of /ɑː/ to /æː/ (generally, unless /w/ followed).
- Final-syllable /æ/, /ɑ/ and /ɑ̃/ are lost.
  - No attested West Germanic languages show any reflexes of these vowels. However, the way it affected the fronting of /ɑ/ as described above shows that at least /ɑ̃/ was retained into the separate history of Anglo-Frisian.

=== Old English period ===
This period is estimated to be c. AD 475–900. This includes changes from the split between Old English and Old Frisian (c. AD 475) up through historic early West Saxon of AD 900:

- Breaking of front vowels.
  - Most generally, before /x, w/, and /r, l/ + consonant (assumed to be velarized [rˠ, lˠ] in these circumstances), but exact conditioning factors vary from vowel to vowel.
  - Initial result was a falling diphthong ending in /u/, but this was followed by diphthong height harmonization, producing short /æ̆ɑ̆/, /ĕŏ/, and /ĭŭ/ from short /æ/, /e/, and /i/. Long /æɑ/, /eo/, and /iu/ came from long /æː/, /eː/, and /iː/.
    - Written ea, eo, io, where length is not distinguished graphically.
  - Result in some dialects, for example Anglian, was back vowels rather than diphthongs. West Saxon ceald; but Anglian cald > ModE cold.
- Diphthong height harmonization: The height of one element of each diphthong is adjusted to match that of the other.
  - /ɑi/ > /ɑː/ through this change, possibly through an intermediate stage /ɑæ/. PG *stainaz > OE stān > ModE stone.
  - /ɑu/ was first fronted to /æu/ and then harmonized to /æɑ/. PG *draumaz > OE drēam "joy" (cf. ModE dream, ModG Traum). PG *dauþuz > OE dēaþ > ModE death (Goth dáuþus, ModG Tod). PG *augō > OE ēage > ModE eye (Goth áugo, ModG Auge).
  - /eu/ is harmonized to /eo/.
- A-restoration: Short /æ/ is backed to /ɑ/ when a back vowel follows in the next syllable.
  - This produces alternations such as OE dæġ "day", pl. dagas (cf. dialectal dawes "days").
- The bilabial fricative /ɸ/ becomes labiodental /f/.
- The voiceless fricatives /θ/, /s/, and /f/ gain word medial voiced allophones [ð], [z], and [v]. Later, the fricative /b/ allophone [β] merges with [v], turning all bilabial fricatives labiodental.
- Palatalization of velar consonants: /k, ɡ, ɣ, sk/ were palatalized to /tʃ, dʒ, ʝ, ʃ/ in certain complex circumstances. A similar palatalization happened in Frisian, but by this point the languages had split up; the Old English palatalization must be ordered after Old-English-specific changes such as a-restoration.
  - Generally, the velar stops /k, ɡ/ were palatalized before /i(ː)/ or /j/; after /i(ː)/ when not before a vowel; and /k/ was palatalized at the beginning of a word before front vowels. (At this point, there was no word-initial /ɡ/.)
  - /ɣ/ was palatalized in somewhat broader circumstances: By any following front vowel, as well as by a preceding front vowel when a vowel did not immediately follow the /ɣ/.
  - /ʝ/ later becomes /j/, but not before the loss of older /j/ below.
  - /sk/ is palatalized in almost all circumstances. PG *skipaz > ModE ship (cf. skipper < Dutch schipper, where no such change happened), but West Frisian skip. PG *skurtijaz > OE scyrte > ModE shirt, but > ON skyrt > ModE skirt. An example of retained /sk/ is PG *aiskōną > OE ascian > ModE ask; there is evidence that OE ascian was sometimes rendered metathetized to acsian, which is the presumed origin of ModE ask (and also of the modern dialectal pronunciation ax).
- Final-obstruent devoicing: The voiced fricatives /ɣ/ and [v] devoice to /x/ and /f/ word finally, although the former is applied inconsistently. WG *daig "dough" > OE dāh.
- /x/ debuccalizes to [h] word initially, and palatalizes to [ç] after front vowels.
  - The consonant clusters /xl/, /xn/, /xr/, and /xw/, turn into voiceless sonorants [l̥], [n̥], [r̥], and [ʍ] word-initially.
- Palatal diphthongization: Initial palatal /j/, /tʃ/, /ʃ/ trigger spelling changes of a > ea, e > ie. It is disputed whether this represents an actual sound change or merely a spelling convention indicating the palatal nature of the preceding consonant (written g, c, sc were ambiguous in OE as to palatal /j/, /tʃ/, /ʃ/ and velar /ɡ/ or /ɣ/, /k/, /sk/, respectively).
  - Similar changes of o > eo, u > eo are generally recognized to be merely a spelling convention. Hence WG /juŋɡ/ > OE geong /juŋɡ/ > ModE "young"; if geong literally indicated an /ɛ̆ɔ̆/ diphthong, the modern result would be *yeng. It is disputed whether there is Middle English evidence of the reality of this change in Old English.
- i-mutation: All back vowels were fronted before a /i, j/ in the next syllable, and front vowels were raised.
  - /ɑ(ː)/ > /æ(ː)/ (but /ɑ/ > /e/ before /m/ or /n/);
  - /æ(ː)/ > /e(ː)/;
  - /o(ː)/ > /ø(ː)/;
  - /u(ː)/ > /y(ː)/;
  - /æa/, /eo/ > /iy/; this also applied to the equivalent short diphthongs.
  - Short /e/ > /i/ by an earlier pan-Germanic change under the same circumstances; often conflated with this change.
  - This had dramatic effects in inflectional and derivational morphology, e.g. in noun paradigms (fōt "foot", pl. fēt "feet"); verb paradigms (bacan "to bake", bæcþ "he bakes"); nominal derivatives from adjectives (strang "strong", strengþ(u) "strength"), from verbs (cuman "to come", cyme "coming"), and from other nouns (fox "fox", fyxenn "vixen"); verbal derivatives (fōda "food", fēdan "to feed"); comparative adjectives (eald "old", ieldra "older, elder"). Many echoes of i-mutation are still present in the modern language.
- Close-vowel loss: Loss of word-final /i/ and /u/ (also from earlier /oː/) except when following a short syllable (i.e. one with a short vowel followed by a single consonant.) For example, PIE *sunus > PG *sunuz > OE sunu "son (nom. sing.)", PIE *peḱu > PG *fehu > OE feohu "cattle (nom. sing.)", PIE *wenis > PG *winiz > OE ƿine "friend (nom. sing.)", but PrePG *pōdes > PG *fōtiz > WG *fø̄ti > OE fēt "foot (nom. pl.)".
- Loss of /j/ and /ij/ following a long syllable.
  - A similar change happened in the other West Germanic languages, although after the earliest records of those languages.
  - This did not affect the new /j/ (< /ʝ/) formed from palatalisation of PG */ɣ/, suggesting that it was still a palatal fricative at the time of the change. For example, PG *wrōgijanan > early OE *wrøːʝijan > OE ƿrēġan (/wreːjan/).
  - Following this, PG */j/ occurred only word-initially and after /r/ (which was the only consonant that was not geminated by /j/ and hence retained a short syllable).
- H-loss: Proto-Germanic /x/ is lost between vowels, and between /l, r/ and a vowel. The preceding vowel is lengthened.
  - This leads to alternations such as eoh "horse", pl. ēos, and ƿealh "foreigner", pl. ƿēalas.
- Vowel assimilation: Two vowels in hiatus merge into a long vowel.
  - Some examples come from h-loss. Others come from loss of /j/ or /w/ between vowels, e.g. PG *frijōndz > OE frīond > frēond "friend"; PG *saiwimiz "sea (dat. pl.)" > *sǣƿum > OE sǣm.
- Back mutation: Short e, i and (in Mercian only) a are sometimes broken to short eo, io, and ea when a back vowel follows in the next syllable.
  - Hence seofon "seven" < PG *sebun, mioluc, meoluc "milk" < PG *meluks.
- Palatal umlaut: Short e, eo, io become i (occasionally ie) before hs, ht.
  - Hence riht "right" (cf. German recht), siex "six" (cf. German sechs).
- Vowel reductions in unstressed syllables:
  - /oː/ became /ɑ/ in final syllables, but usually appears as o in medial syllables (although a and u both appear).
  - /æ/ and /i/ (if not deleted by high-vowel loss) became /e/ in final syllables.
  - /u/ normally became /o/ in a final syllable except when absolutely word-final.
  - In medial syllables, short /æ, a, e/ are deleted; short /i, u/ are deleted following a long syllable but usually remain following a short syllable (except in some present-tense verb forms), merging to /e/ in the process; and long vowels are shortened.
- /ø, øː/ are unrounded to /e, eː/, respectively. This occurred within the literary period.
  - Some Old English dialects retained the rounded vowels, however.
- Early pre-cluster shortening: Vowels were shortened when falling immediately before either three consonants or the combination of two consonants and two additional syllables in the word.
  - Thus, OE gāst > ModE ghost, but OE găstliċ > ModE ghastly (ā > ă) and OE crīst > ModE Christ, but OE crĭstesmæsse > ModE Christmas (ī > ĭ).
  - Probably occurred in the seventh century as evidenced by eighth century Anglo-Saxon missionaries' translation into Old Low German, "Gospel" as Gotspel, lit. "God news" not expected *Guotspel, "Good news" due to gōdspell > gŏdspell.
- /ĭŭ/ and /iu/ were lowered to /ĕŏ/ and /eo/ between 800 and 900 AD.
- /ĭy̆/ and /iy/ became /y/ and /yː/.
- Initial /ɣ/ became /ɡ/ in late Old English. This occurred within the literary period, as evidenced by shifting patterns in alliterative verse.

== Changes by time period from Middle English to American–British split ==
=== Middle English period ===
This period is estimated to be c. 900–1400.

- Homorganic lengthening: Vowels were lengthened before /ld/, /mb/, /nd/, /rd/, probably also /ŋɡ/, /rl/, /rn/, when not followed by a third consonant or two consonants and two syllables.
  - This probably occurred around AD 1000.
  - Later on, many of these vowels were shortened again; but evidence from the Ormulum shows that this lengthening was once quite general.
  - Remnants persist in the Modern English pronunciations of words such as child (but not children, since a third consonant follows), field (plus yield, wield, shield), old (but not alderman as it is followed by at least two syllables), climb, find (plus mind, kind, bind, etc.), long and strong (from OE lang, strang, with /ɑ/ > /ɑː/ > /ɔː/ > /ɔ/ from later vowel shifts and subsequent shortening ), fiend, found (plus hound, bound, etc.).
- Pre-cluster shortening: Vowels were shortened when followed by two or more consonants, except when lengthened as above.
  - This occurred in two stages, the first stage occurring already in late Old English and affecting only vowels followed by three or more consonants, or two or more consonants when two syllables followed (an early form of trisyllabic laxing).
- Diphthong smoothing: Inherited height-harmonic diphthongs were monophthongized by the loss of the second component, with the length remaining the same.
  - /æ̆ɑ̆/ and /æɑ/ initially became /æ/ and /æː/.
  - /ĕŏ/ and /eo/ initially became /ø/ and /øː/.
- Middle English stressed vowel changes:
  - /æː/ (from Old English /æː, æɑ/) and /ɑː/ became /ɛː/ and /ɔː/, respectively.
  - /æ/ (from Old English /æ, æ̆ɑ̆/) and /ɑ/ merged into /a/.
  - New front rounded /ø/ and /øː/ (from Old English /ĕŏ, eo/) were unrounded to /e/ and /eː/.
  - /y/ and /yː/ were unrounded to /i/ and /iː/.
- Reduction of unstressed vowels: Unstressed vowels merged into /ə/.
- -dər > -ðər, unless /n/ preceded it.
- /ɣ/ became /w/ or /j/, depending on surrounding vowels.
- Doubled consonants reduced to single consonants.
- New diphthongs formed from vowels followed by /w/ or /j/ (including from former /ɣ/).
  - Length distinctions were eliminated in these diphthongs, yielding diphthongs /ai, ɛi, ei, au, ɛu, eu, iu, ɔu, ou/ plus /ɔi, ui/ borrowed from French.
  - Middle English breaking: Diphthongs also formed by the insertion of a glide /w/ or /j/ (after back and front vowels, respectively) preceding /x/.
- Mergers of new diphthongs:
  - Early on, high-mid diphthongs were raised: /ei/ merged with /iː/ (hence eye < OE ēġe rhymes with rye < *riġe < OE ryġe), /ou/ merged with /uː/ and /eu/ merged with /iu/ (hence rue < OE hrēoƿan rhymes with hue < OE hīƿ and new < OE nīƿe).
  - In Late Middle English, /ai/ and /ɛi/ merge as /ɛi/, so that vain and vein are homophones (the vein–vain merger).
- Trisyllabic laxing: Shortening of stressed vowels when two syllables followed.
  - This results in pronunciation variants in Modern English such as divine vs divinity and south vs. southern (OE sūðerne).
- Middle English open syllable lengthening: Vowels were usually lengthened in open syllables (13th century), except when trisyllabic laxing would apply.
  - With the exception of /a/, these lengthened vowels would change in value, becoming lower: /i/ > /eː/, /e/ > /ɛː/, /u/ > /oː/, /o/ > /ɔː/.
- Starting around 1400 AD, /ə/ is lost in final syllables.
- Voiceless sonorants [l̥], [n̥], and [r̥] merged into their voiced counterparts.
- Voiced fricatives became independent phonemes through borrowing and other sound changes.
- /sw/ before back vowel becomes /s/; /mb/ becomes /m/.
  - Modern English sword, answer, lamb.
  - /w/ in swore is due to analogy with swear.
- The /t͡s/ cluster, present in words imported from Norman, is deaffricated, and merges with /s/ (which had perhaps been apical in medieval times, as in closely related Dutch and Low German), thus merging sell and cell.
  - But unlike French, /t͡ʃ/ and /d͡ʒ/ are fully preserved.
- In late Middle English, the extremely rare word-initial cluster fn- became sn- (EME fnesen > LME snezen > ModE sneeze).
  - It has been suggested that the change could be due to a misinterpretation of the uncommon initial sequence fn- as ſn- (sn- written with a long s).

=== Up to Shakespeare's English ===
This period is estimated to be c. AD 1400–1600.

- H-loss completed: /x/ (written gh) lost in most dialects, so that e.g. taught and taut become homophones, likewise bow (meaning "bend") and bough. However, when preceded by /u/ (including in diphthongs), it sometimes got labialized to /f/, as in enough.
- Short /i, u, e, o/ lower to /ɪ, ʊ, ɛ, ɔ/.
- /al/ and /ɔl/ when not followed by a vowel undergo mutations:
  - Before /k/, a coronal consonant or word-finally, they are diphthongized to /aul/ and /ɔul/. (By later changes, they become /ɔːl/ and /oul/, as in modern bald, tall, bold, roll.) After this, the combinations /aulk/ and /ɔulk/ lose their /l/ in most accents, affecting words like talk, caulk, and folk. Words acquired after this change (such as talc) were not affected.
  - Before /f, v/, the /l/ becomes silent, so that half and calf are pronounced with /af/, and salve and halve are pronounced with /av/. /ɔlv/ is exempt, so that solve keeps its /l/. /ɔlf/ is not wholly exempt, as the traditional pronunciation of golf was [ɡɔf].
  - Before /m/, /al, ɔl/ become /ɑː, oː/, as in alms, balm, calm, palm; Holmes.
  - Some words have irregular pronunciations, e.g. from non-standard dialects (salmon) or spelling pronunciations (falcon in American English).
- Great Vowel Shift; all long vowels raised or diphthongized.
  - /aː, ɛː, eː/ become /ɛː, eː, iː/, respectively.
  - /ɔː, oː/ become /oː, uː/, respectively.
  - /iː, uː/ become /əi, əu/ or /ei, ou/, later /ai/ and /au/.
  - New /ɔː/ developed from old /au/ (see below).
    - Thus, /ɔː, oː, uː, au/ effectively rotated in-place.
  - Later, the new /ɛː, eː/ are shifted again to /eː, iː/ in Early Modern English, causing merger of former /eː/ with /iː/; but the two are still distinguished in spelling as ea, ee. the meet-meat merger (see below)
- Initial cluster reductions:
  - /wr/ merges into /r/; hence rap and wrap become homophones.
- Loss of most remaining diphthongs.
  - /au/ became /ɔː/, merging with the vowel in broad and the /ɔː/ of the lot–cloth split below.
  - The long mid mergers: /ɛi, ɔu/ are raised to /ei, ou/, eventually merging with /eː, oː/, so that pane and pain, and toe and tow, become homophones in most accents.
  - The above two mergers did not occur in many regional dialects as late as the 20th century (e.g. Northern England, East Anglia, South Wales, and even Newfoundland).
  - /y, ɛu, iu/ merge to [ɪʊ̯], so that dew (EME /dɛu/ < OE dēaƿ), duke (EME /dyk/ < Old French duc /dyk/) and new (EME /niu/ < OE nīƿe) now have the same vowel.
    - This /ɪu/ would become /juː/ in standard varieties of English, and later still /uː/ in some cases through "Yod-dropping".
    - /iu/ remains in Welsh English and some other non-standard varieties.
  - /ɔi/ and /ui/ merge to /oi̯/ (today /ɔɪ/), the only Middle English diphthong that remains in the modern standard English varieties.

=== Up to the American–British split ===
This period is estimated to be c. AD 1600–1725.

- At some preceding time after Old English, all [r] become [ɹ].
  - Much of Scottish English has [r] consistently.
- /p t k/ develop aspirated allophones /pʰ tʰ kʰ/ when they occur alone at the beginning of stressed syllables.
- Initial cluster reductions:
  - /ɡn, kn/ both merge into /n/; hence gnat and Nat become homophones; likewise not and knot.
- The foot–strut split: In southern England, /ʊ/ becomes unrounded and eventually lowered unless preceded by a labial and followed by a non-velar. This gives put [pʊt] but cut [kʌt] and buck [bʌk]. This distinction later become phonemicized by an influx of words shortened from /uː/ to /ʊ/ both before (flood, blood, glove) and after (good, hood, book, soot, took) this split.
- Ng-coalescence: Reduction of /ŋɡ/ in most areas produces new phoneme /ŋ/.
- In some words, /tj, sj, dj, zj/ coalesce to produce /tʃ, ʃ, dʒ, ʒ/ with /ʒ/ being a new phoneme, a sound change known as yod-coalescence, a type of palatalization: nature, mission, procedure, vision.
  - These combinations mostly occurred in borrowings from French and Latin.
  - Pronunciation of -tion was /sjən/ from Old French /sjon/, thus becoming /ʃən/.
  - This sound mutation still occurs allophonically in Modern English: did you /ˈdɪdjuː/ → [ˈdɪdʒuː] didjou.
- /ɔ/ as in lot, top, and fox, is lowered towards /ɒ/.
- Long vowels /eː, uː/, from ME /ɛː, oː/, inconsistently shortened, especially before /t, d, θ, ð/: sweat, head, bread, breath, death, leather, weather
  - Shortening of /uː/ occurred at differing time periods, both before and after the centralizing of /ʊ/ to /ʌ/; hence blood /blʌd/ versus good /ɡʊd/: also foot, soot.
- The Meet–meat merger: /eː/ (ea) raises to /iː/ (ee). Thus Meet and meat become homophones in most accents. Words with (ea) that were shortened (see above) avoided the merger, also some words like steak and great simply remained with an /eː/ (which later becomes /eɪ/ in most varieties), merging with words like name, so now death, great, and meat have three different vowels.
- Changes affect short vowels in many varieties before an /r/ at the end of a word or before a consonant:
  - /a/ as in start and /ɔ/ as in north are lengthened.
  - /ɛ, ɪ, ʌ, ʊ/ (the last of these often deriving from earlier /oːr/ after w, as in worm and word) merge before /r/, so all varieties of ModE except for some Scottish English and some Irish English have the same vowel in fern, fir and fur.
  - Also affects vowels in derived forms, so that starry no longer rhymes with marry.
- /a/, as in cat and trap, fronted to [æ] in many areas. In certain other words it becomes /ɑː/, for example father /ˈfɑːðər/. /ɑː/ is actually a new phoneme deriving from this and words like calm (see above).
  - Most varieties of Northern England English, Welsh English and Scottish English retain [a] in cat, trap etc.
- The lot–cloth split: in some varieties, lengthening of /ɔ/ before voiced velars (/ŋ/, /ɡ/) (American English only) and voiceless fricatives (/s/, /f/, /θ/). Hence American English long, dog, loss, cloth, off with /ɔː/ (except in dialects with the cot–caught merger where the split is made completely moot).
- /uː/ becomes /ʊ/ in many words spelt oo: for example, book, wool, good, foot. This is partially resisted in the northern and western variants of English English, where words ending in -ook might still use /uː/.

== Changes by time period from after American–British split to after World War II ==
=== After American–British split, up to World War II ===
This period is estimated to be c. AD 1725–1945.

- Split into rhotic and non-rhotic accents: syllable-final /r/ is lost in much of the English of England, with exceptions including West Country English and Lancashire dialect.
  - The loss of coda /r/ causes significant changes to preceding vowels:
    - /ər/ merges with /ə/ in unstressed syllables, /ɜː/ in stressed syllables
    - /aɪr, aʊr, ɔɪr/ become /aɪə, aʊə, ɔɪə/
    - /ær, ɒr/ (phonetically [ɑːɹ, ɔːɹ]) become long vowels, /ɑː, ɔː/.
    - All other short vowels plus coda /r/ merge as a new phoneme, the long mid-central vowel /ɜː/.
    - Long vowels with a coda /r/, /eːr, iːr, oːr, uːr/, become new centering diphthongs, /ɛə, ɪə, ɔə, ʊə/.
    - Long vowels before intervocalic /r/ are also diphthongised, thus dairy /ˈdɛər.ɪ/ from earlier /ˈdeː.rɪ/.
  - The Southern Hemisphere varieties of English (Australian, New Zealand, and South African) are also non-rhotic.
  - Non-rhotic accents of North American English include New York City, Boston, and older Southern.
- Unrounding of LOT: /ɒ/ as in lot and bother is unrounded in Norwich, the West Country, in Hiberno-English and most of North American English
  - The Boston accent is an exception where the LOT vowel is still rounded.
  - In North American English, /ɑː/ in father is typically also unlengthened to merge with the unrounded /ɒ/, resulting in the father–bother merger: so that most North American dialects only have the vowel /ɑ/.
    - Out of North American dialects that have unrounded LOT, the only notable exception is New York City.
- The trap–bath split: in Southern England /æ/ inconsistently becomes /ɑː/ before /s, f, θ/ and /n/ or /m/ followed by another consonant.
  - Hence RP has pass, glass, grass, class with /ɑː/ but mass, crass with /æ/.
  - All six words rhyme in most American, Scottish English and Northern England English.
- The long vowels /eː oː/ from the Great Vowel Shift become diphthongs /eɪ oʊ/ in many varieties of English, though not in Scottish and Northern England English.
- Voicing of /ʍ/ to /w/ results in the wine–whine merger in most varieties of English, aside from Scottish, Irish, Southern American, and New England English.
- In American, Canadian, Australian and to some degree New Zealand English, /t, d/ are flapped or voiced to [ɾ] between vowels.
  - Generally, between vowels or the syllabic consonants [ɹ̩, l̩, m̩], when the following syllable is completely unstressed: butter, bottle, bottom [ˈbʌɾɹ̩ ˈbɑːɾl̩ ˈbɑːɾm̩].
  - But /d/ and /t/ before syllabic [n̩] is pronounced as a glottal stop, so cotton [ˈkɑːʔn̩].
- Happy-tensing (the term is from Wells 1982): final lax [ɪ] becomes tense [i] in words like happY. Absent from some dialects like Southern American English, Traditional RP, cultivated South African English, most forms of Northern England English (excluding Scouse and Geordie) and to some degree Scottish English.
- Line–loin merger: merger between the diphthongs /aɪ/ and /ɔɪ/ in some accents of Southern England English, Hiberno-English, Newfoundland English, and Caribbean English.
- H-dropping begins in England and Welsh English, but this does not affect the upper-class southern accent that developed into Received Pronunciation, nor does it affect the far north of England or East Anglia.
- Reversal of the lot-cloth split in British English so words like cloth revert to being pronounced with /ɒ/. The split survives in American English.

=== After World War II ===
Some of these changes are in progress.

- Restoration of post-vocalic /r/ in some non-rhotic accents of Southern American English as well as (more gradually) in New York City English and Eastern New England English.
- Changes to the low front vowel /æ/
  - /æ/ raising: raising, lengthening or diphthongization of [æ] in some varieties of American English in various contexts, especially before nasal consonants, resulting in [eə, ɪə, æɪ]. Some linguistics research suggests that æ raising existed since the American colonial era, due to relic evidence of this feature in some of the Northern and Midland U.S.
  - Bad–lad split: the lengthening of [æ] to [æː] in some words, found especially in Australian English and to a degree in Southern English English.
  - Raising [æ] to [ɛ] in New Zealand English and South African English.
  - Lowering to [a] in Received Pronunciation, Canadian English, Western American English, and Australian English (except before nasal consonants in the latter two).
- Changes to the non-high back vowels /ɒ/ and /ɔː/:
  - /ɒ/ is raised to [ɔ] and /ɔː/ is raised to [oː] in Southern England English, Australian English and New Zealand English.
  - Cot–caught merger: lowering of /ɔ/ to /ɑ/ in Western American English and some dialects in New England and the Midland region. This sound change is still in progress.
- Fronting of high back vowels /uː/, /oʊ/, /ʌ/ and /ʊ/.
  - In many varieties of English, /uː/ is fronted to [u̟], [ʉw], or [ɵu̯]
    - Resistance occurs in Northern American English and New York City English.
  - In Australian English, New Zealand English, most English of England and some American English, /oʊ/ is fronted to [ɵw], [əw], or [ɛw]
    - Resistance occurs in most varieties of Northern England English, as well as Scottish English, Northern American English and New York City English.
  - In many varieties /ʌ/ is fronted to [ʌ̟], [ɜ], [ə], [ɐ].
  - In Southern England English, /ʊ/ is fronted to [ɵ].
- Lock–loch merger: the replacement of [x] with [k] among some younger Scottish English speakers from Glasgow. (Department of Language and Linguistics | University of Essex)
- Pin–pen merger: the raising of /ɛ/ to /ɪ/ before nasal consonants in Southern American English and southwestern varieties of Hiberno-English.
- Horse-hoarse merger: /ɔr/ and /or/ merge in many varieties of English
- Vowel mergers before intervocalic /r/ in most of North America (resistance occurs mainly on the east coast):
  - Mary–marry–merry merger: /ɛər/ and /ær/ merge to /ɛr/.
  - Hurry-furry merger: /ʌr/ and /ɜr/ merge to [ɚ].
  - Mirror-nearer merger /ɪr/ and /ɪər/ merge or are very similar, the merged vowel can be quite variable.
- T-glottalization becomes increasingly widespread in Great Britain.
- Various treatments of the th sounds, the dental fricatives /θ, ð/:
  - Th-fronting: merger with the labiodental fricatives /f, v/
  - Th-stopping: shift to dental stops [t̪, d̪], or merger with alveolar stops [t, d]
  - Th-debuccalization: lenition to [h]
  - Th-alveolarization: merger with alveolar fricatives [s, z]
- L-vocalization: [l] changes to an approximant or vowel, such as [w], [o] or [ʊ]. This occurs in Estuary English and other dialects.
- Yod-dropping: loss of /j/ in some consonant clusters. Though it occurs in some environments in many British English dialects, it is most extensive in American and (in younger speakers) Canadian English.
- Northern Cities Vowel Shift in Inland Northern American English:
  - raising and tensing of /æ/ (in reversal in many locations before non-nasal consonants)
  - fronting of /ɑː/ (also somewhat in reversal)
  - lowering of /ɔː/
  - backing and lowering of /ɛ/
  - backing of /ʌ/
  - lowering and backing of /ɪ/
- Changes to centering diphthongs in non-rhotic varieties of English (England and Australia):
  - /ɪə, ɛə, ɑə, ɔə/ smooth to [ɪː, ɛː, ɑː, ɔː~oː]: near, square, start, force.
  - [ʊə] either
    - smooths (and possibly also fronts) to [ʊː~ɵː],
    - breaks to [uːə],
    - lowers and merges with /ɔː/ (pour–poor merger):
  - Triphthongs /aɪə/, /aʊə/ smooth to [aː] or [ɑː] (tower–tire, tower–tar and tire–tar mergers).
- Other changes to diphthongs in Received Pronunciation:
  - /eɪ/ is lowered to [ɛɪ].
  - /aɪ/ is retracted to [ɑɪ].
  - /ɔɪ/ is raised to [oɪ].
  - /aʊ/ is fronted from [ɑʊ] to [aʊ].

== Examples of sound changes ==
The following table shows a possible sequence of changes for some basic vocabulary items, leading from Proto-Indo-European (PIE) to Modern English. The notation ">!" indicates an unexpected change, whereas the simple notation ">" indicates an expected change. An empty cell means no change at the given stage for the given item. Only sound changes that had an effect on one or more of the vocabulary items are shown.

	one	two	three	four	five	six	seven	mother	heart	meet	foot	feet
Proto-Indo-European	*óynos	*dwóy	*tréyes	*kʷetwṓr	*pénkʷe	*séḱs	*septḿ̥	*méh₂tēr	*ḱḗr	*méh₂dyonom	*pṓds	*pódes
Laryngeal coloring								*máh₂tēr		*máh₂dyonom		
Centumization						*séks			*kḗr			
Pre-Germanic unexpected changes (perhaps P-Celtic or P-Italic influences)				>! petwṓr	>! pémpe		>! sepḿ̥d	>! mah₂tḗr	>! kérdō			pṓdes
Sonorant epenthesis							sepúmd					
Final overlong vowels									kérdô			
Laryngeal loss								mātḗr		mā́dyonom		
Loss of final nonhigh vowels					pemp							
Grimm's Law		twoi	þréjes	feþwṓr	fémf	sehs	sefúmt	māþḗr	hértô	mā́tyonom	fṓts	fṓtes
Verner's Law	oinoz		þrejez	feðwōr			seβumt	māðēr				fōtez
Unstressed syllables: owo > ō, ew > ow, e > i, ji > i			þreiz									fōtiz
Early i-mutation			þrīz									
o > a, ō > ā, ô > â	ainaz	twai		feðwār					hertâ	mātjanam	fāts	fātiz
Final -m > -n										mātjanan		
m > n before dental							seβunt					
Final -n > nasalization										mātjaną		
Loss of final -t							seβun					
Sievers' Law										mātijaną		
Nasal raising					fimf							
ā > ō, â > ô				feðwōr				mōðēr	hertô	mōtijaną	fōts	fōtiz
Proto-Germanic form	*ainaz	*twai	*þrīz	*feðwōr	*fimf	*sehs	*seβun	*mōðēr	*hertô	*mōtijaną	*fōts	*fōtiz
Final vowel shortening/loss	*ainz?		*þrīz	*feðwur				*mōðar	*hertō	*mōtijan		
Final -z loss	*ain		*þrī									*fōti
Intervocalic ðw > ww				*fewwur								
Fortition: ð > d								*mōdar				
Morphological changes			>! *þriju						>! *herta		> *fōt	
West Germanic pre-form	ain	twai	þriju	fewwur	finf	sehs	seβun	mōdar	herta	mōtijan	fōt	fōti
Ingvaeonic (prespirant) nasal loss					fīf							
ai > ā	ān	twā										
Anglo-Frisian brightening									hertæ			
β > v, f [ɸ] > [f]					fīf		sevun					fōti
I-mutation										mōetijan		fōeti
Loss of medial -ij-										mōetan		
Breaking									hĕŭrtæ			
Diphthong height harmony				feowur					hĕŏrtæ			
Back mutation							sĕŏvun					
Final reduction				feowor			sĕŏvon	>! mōdor	hĕŏrte			fōet
Unrounding: /ø(ː)/ > /e(ː)/										mētan		fēt
Raising: ehs eht > ihs iht						sihs						
hs > ks						siks						
Late OE lowering: iu > eo			þreo									
Late Old English spelling	ān	twā	þrēo	fēowor	fīf	six	seofon	mōdor	heorte	mētan	fōt	fēt
Middle English (ME) smoothing			θrøː	føːwor			søvon		hørte			
ME final reduction				føːwər			søvən	moːdər	hørtə	meːtən		
ME /aː æː/ > /ɔː ɛː/	ɔːn	twɔː										
/-dər/ > /-ðər/								moːðər				
ME unexpected (?) vowel changes					>! fiːv-ə							
ME diphthong changes				>! fowər								
Late ME unrounding			θreː				sevən		hertə			
Late Middle English spelling (c. 1350)	oon	two	three	fower	five	six	seven	mother	herte	meeten	foot	feet
Late ME final reduction (late 1300s)				>! fowr	fiːv				hert	meːt		
Late ME /er/ > /ar/ (1400s)									hart			
Late ME Great Vowel Shift (c. 1400–1550)	oːn	twoː	θriː		fəiv			muːðər		miːt	fuːt	fiːt
Early Modern English (EModE) smoothing				foːr								
EModE raising /woː/ > /wuː/ > /uː/		tuː										
EModE shortening								mʊðər				
EModE /ʊ/ > /ɤ/ > /ʌ/	ʊn >! wʌn							mʌðər				
EModE shortening											fʊt	
Later vowel shifts				fɔːr	faiv	sɪks			hɑrt			
Loss of -r (regional)				fɔː				mʌðə	hɑːt			
Modern pronunciation	wʌn	tuː	θriː	fɔː(r)	faɪv	sɪks	sevən	mʌðə(r)	hɑrt/hɑːt	miːt	fʊt	fiːt
	one	two	three	four	five	six	seven	mother	heart	meet	foot	feet

NOTE: Some of the changes listed above as "unexpected" are more predictable than others. For example:

- Some changes are morphological ones that move a word from a rare declension to a more common one, and hence are not so surprising: e.g. *þrī "three" >! *þriu (adding the common West Germanic feminine ending -u) and *keːr "heart" (stem *kerd-) >! *kérd-oː (change from consonant stem to n-stem).
- Some changes are assimilations that are unexpected but of a cross-linguistically common type, e.g. føːwər "four" >! fowər where **fewər would be expected by normal sound change. Assimilations involving adjacent numbers are especially common, e.g. *kʷetwṓr "four" >! *petwṓr by assimilation to *pénkʷe "five" (in addition, /kʷ/ > /p/ is a cross-linguistically common sound change in general).
- On the other extreme, the Early Modern English change of /oːn/ "one" >! /wʊn/ is almost completely mysterious. Note that the related words alone ( < all + one) and only ( < one + -ly) did not change.

== Summary of vowel developments ==
=== Development of Middle English vowels ===
==== Monophthongs ====
This table describes the main historical developments of English vowels in the last 1000 years, beginning with late Old English and focusing on the Middle English and Modern English changes leading to the current forms. It provides a lot of detail about the changes taking place in the last 600 years (since Middle English), while omitting any detail in the Old English and earlier periods. For more detail about the changes in the first millennium AD, see the section on the development of Old English vowels.

This table omits the history of Middle English diphthongs; see that link for a table summarizing the developments.

The table is organized around the pronunciation of Late Middle English c. 1400 AD (the time of Chaucer) and the modern spelling system, which dates from the same time and closely approximates the pronunciation of the time. Modern English spelling originates in the spelling conventions of Middle English scribes and its modern form was largely determined by William Caxton, the first English printer (beginning in 1476).

As an example, the vowel spelled ⟨a⟩ corresponds to two Middle English pronunciations: /a/ in most circumstances, but long /aː/ in an open syllable, i.e. followed by a single consonant and then a vowel, notated aCV in the spelling column. (This discussion ignores the effect of trisyllabic laxing.) The lengthened variant is due to the Early Middle English process of open-syllable lengthening; this is indicated by (leng.). Prior to that time, both vowels were pronounced the same, as a short vowel /a/; this is reflected by the fact that there is a single merged field corresponding to both Middle English sounds in the Late Old English column (the first column). However, this earlier Middle English vowel /a/ is itself the merger of a number of different Anglian Old English sounds:

1. the short vowels indicated in Old English spelling as ⟨a⟩, ⟨æ⟩ and ⟨ea⟩;
2. the long equivalents ⟨ā⟩, ⟨ēa⟩, and often ⟨ǣ⟩ when directly followed by two or more consonants (indicated by ā+CC, ǣ+CC, etc.);
3. occasionally, the long vowel ⟨ē⟩ when directly followed by two consonants, particularly when this vowel corresponded to West Saxon Old English ⟨ǣ⟩. (Middle English, and hence Modern English, largely derives from the Anglian dialect of Old English, but some words are derived from the West Saxon dialect of Old English, because the border between the two dialects ran through the London area. The West Saxon dialect, not the Anglian dialect, is the "standard" dialect described in typical reference works on Old English.)

Moving forward in time, the two Middle English vowels /a/ and /aː/ correspond directly to the two vowels /a/ and /ɛː/, respectively, in the Early Modern English of c. 1600 AD (the time of Shakespeare). However, each vowel has split into a number of different pronunciations in Modern English, depending on the phonological context. The short /a/, for example, has split into seven different vowels, all still spelled ⟨a⟩ but pronounced differently:

1. /æ/ when not in any of the contexts indicated below, as in man, sack, wax, etc.
2. A vowel pronounced /ɑː/ in General American (GA) and /ɒ/ in Received Pronunciation (RP) when preceded by /w/ and not followed by the velar consonants /k/, /ɡ/ or /ŋ/, as in swan, wash, wallow, etc. (General American is the standard pronunciation in the U.S. and Received Pronunciation is the most prestigious pronunciation in Britain. In both cases, these are the pronunciations typically found in news broadcasts and among the middle and upper classes.)
3. /ɑːr/ (GA) or /ɑː/ (RP) when followed by a written ⟨r⟩, as in hard, car, etc. (This does not include words like care, where the ⟨a⟩ was pronounced as long /aː/ in Middle English.)
4. But /ɔːr/ (GA) or /ɔː/ (RP) when both preceded by /w/ and followed by written ⟨r⟩, as in war, swarm, etc.
5. /ɔː/ when followed by an /l/ plus either a consonant or the end of a word, as in small, walk, etc. (In the case of walk, talk, chalk, etc. the /l/ has dropped out, but this is not indicated here. Words like rally, shallow and swallow are not covered here because the /l/ is followed by a vowel; instead, earlier rules apply. Nor are words like male covered, which had long /aː/ in Middle English.)
6. /ɑː/ when followed by /lm/, as in palm, calm, etc. (The /l/ has dropped out in pronunciation.)
7. In RP only, the pronunciation /ɑː/ is often found when followed by an unvoiced fricative, i.e. /f/, /s/ or /θ/ (but not /ʃ/), as in glass, after, path, etc. This does not apply to GA and also unpredictably does not affect a number of words of the same form, e.g. crass, math, etc.

NOTE: In this table, abbreviations are used as follows:

- OE = Old English
- WS = West Saxon (dialect of Old English)
- ME = Middle English
- NE = Modern English
- GA = General American (generalised U.S. accent of Modern English)
- RP = Received Pronunciation (prestige British accent of Modern English)
- AN = Anglo-Norman
- leng. = lengthened by open-syllable lengthening
- occ. = occasionally
- > = produces by regular sound change
- >! = produces by analogy or irregular change

Late Old English (Anglian), c. 1000	Middle English pronunciation, c. 1400	Modern English spelling, c. 1500	Early Modern English pronunciation, c. 1600	Modern English pronunciation, c. 2000	Source	Example
a; æ; ea; ā+CC; often ǣ+CC,ēa+CC; occ. ē+CC (WS ǣ+CC)	/a/	a	/a/	/æ/	OE a	OE mann > man; OE lamb > lamb; OE sang > sang; OE sacc > sack; OE assa > ass (donkey)
a; æ; ea; ā+CC; often ǣ+CC,ēa+CC; occ. ē+CC (WS ǣ+CC)	/a/	a	/a/	/æ/	OE æ	OE fæþm > fathom; OE sæt > sat; OE æt > at; OE mæsse > mass (at church)
a; æ; ea; ā+CC; often ǣ+CC,ēa+CC; occ. ē+CC (WS ǣ+CC)	/a/	a	/a/	/æ/	OE ea	OE weax > wax; OE healf > half /hæf/ (GA)
a; æ; ea; ā+CC; often ǣ+CC,ēa+CC; occ. ē+CC (WS ǣ+CC)	/a/	a	/a/	/æ/	OE +CC	OE āscian > ask /æsk/ (GA); OE fǣtt > fat; OE lǣstan > to last /læst/ (GA) ; OE blēddre (WS blǣddre) > bladder; OE brēmbel (WS brǣmbel) > bramble
a; æ; ea; ā+CC; often ǣ+CC,ēa+CC; occ. ē+CC (WS ǣ+CC)	/a/	a	/a/	(w+, not +g,ck,ng,nk) GA /ɑ/, RP /ɒ/	OE a	OE swan > swan; OE wasċan > to wash; OE wann dark > wan
a; æ; ea; ā+CC; often ǣ+CC,ēa+CC; occ. ē+CC (WS ǣ+CC)	/a/	a	/a/	(w+, not +g,ck,ng,nk) GA /ɑ/, RP /ɒ/	OE æ	OE swæþ > swath; OE wæsp > wasp
a; æ; ea; ā+CC; often ǣ+CC,ēa+CC; occ. ē+CC (WS ǣ+CC)	/a/	a	/a/	(w+, not +g,ck,ng,nk) GA /ɑ/, RP /ɒ/	OE ea	OE wealwian > to wallow; OE swealwe > swallow (bird)
a; æ; ea; ā+CC; often ǣ+CC,ēa+CC; occ. ē+CC (WS ǣ+CC)	/a/	a	/a/	(+r) /ar/ > GA /ɑr/, RP /ɑː/		OE heard > hard; OE ærc (WS earc) > ark
a; æ; ea; ā+CC; often ǣ+CC,ēa+CC; occ. ē+CC (WS ǣ+CC)	/a/	a	/a/	(w+ and +r) /ɔr/ > GA /ɔr/, RP /ɔː/	OE ea	OE swearm > swarm; OE sweart > old poetic swart >! swarthy; OE weardian > to ward; OE wearm > warm; OE wearnian > to warn
a; æ; ea; ā+CC; often ǣ+CC,ēa+CC; occ. ē+CC (WS ǣ+CC)	/a/	a	/a/	(+lC,l#) /ɔː/		OE smæl > small; OE all (WS eall) > all; OE walcian (WS wealcian) to roll > to walk
a; æ; ea; ā+CC; often ǣ+CC,ēa+CC; occ. ē+CC (WS ǣ+CC)	/a/	a	/a/	(+lm) GA /ɑ/, RP /ɑː/		OE ælmesse > alms; Latin palma > OE 'palm > palm
a; æ; ea; ā+CC; often ǣ+CC,ēa+CC; occ. ē+CC (WS ǣ+CC)	/a/	a	/a/	(RP, often +f,s,th) /ɑː/		OE glæs > glass; OE græs > grass; OE pæþ > path; OE æfter > after; OE āscian /ɑːsk/ > to ask; OE lǣstan /lɑːst/ > to last
a; æ; ea; ā+CC; often ǣ+CC,ēa+CC; occ. ē+CC (WS ǣ+CC)	(leng.) /aː/ [æː]	aCV	/ɛː/	/eː/ > /eɪ/	OE a	OE nama > name; OE nacod > naked; OE bacan > to bake
a; æ; ea; ā+CC; often ǣ+CC,ēa+CC; occ. ē+CC (WS ǣ+CC)	(leng.) /aː/ [æː]	aCV	/ɛː/	/eː/ > /eɪ/	OE æ	OE æcer > acre; OE hwæl > whale; OE hræfn > raven
a; æ; ea; ā+CC; often ǣ+CC,ēa+CC; occ. ē+CC (WS ǣ+CC)	(leng.) /aː/ [æː]	aCV	/ɛː/	(+r) /eːr/ > GA /ɛr/, RP /ɛə/	OE a	OE caru > care; OE faran > to fare; OE starian > to stare
e; eo; occ. y; ē+CC; ēo+CC; occ. ǣ+CC,ēa+CC	/e/	e	/ɛ/	/ɛ/	OE e	OE helpan > to help; OE elh (WS eolh) > elk; OE tellan > to tell; OE betera > better; OE streċċan > to stretch
e; eo; occ. y; ē+CC; ēo+CC; occ. ǣ+CC,ēa+CC	/e/	e	/ɛ/	/ɛ/	OE eo	OE seofon > seven
e; eo; occ. y; ē+CC; ēo+CC; occ. ǣ+CC,ēa+CC	/e/	e	/ɛ/	/ɛ/	OE y	OE myriġ > merry; OE byrġan > to bury /ˈbɛri/; OE lyft- weak > left (hand); OE cnyll > knell
e; eo; occ. y; ē+CC; ēo+CC; occ. ǣ+CC,ēa+CC	/e/	e	/ɛ/	/ɛ/	OE +CC	OE cēpte > kept; OE mētte > met; OE bēcnan (WS bīecnan) > to beckon; OE clǣnsian > to cleanse; OE flǣsċ > flesh; OE lǣssa > less; OE frēond > friend /frɛnd/; OE þēofþ (WS þīefþ) > theft; OE hēold > held
e; eo; occ. y; ē+CC; ēo+CC; occ. ǣ+CC,ēa+CC	/e/	(+r) ar	/ar/	GA /ɑr/, RP /ɑː/		OE heorte > heart; OE bercan (WS beorcan) > to bark; OE teoru (WS teru) > tar; OE steorra > star
e; eo; occ. y; ē+CC; ēo+CC; occ. ǣ+CC,ēa+CC	/e/	(+r) ar	/ar/	(w+ and +r) /ɔr/ > GA /ɔr/, RP /ɔː/		AN werra > war; AN werbler > to warble
e; eo; occ. y; ē+CC; ēo+CC; occ. ǣ+CC,ēa+CC	/e/	(occ. +r) er	/ɛr/	/ər/ > GA /ər/, RP /ɜː/	OE e	OE sterne (WS stierne, styrne) > stern
e; eo; occ. y; ē+CC; ēo+CC; occ. ǣ+CC,ēa+CC	/e/	(occ. +r) er	/ɛr/	/ər/ > GA /ər/, RP /ɜː/	OE eo	OE eorl > earl; OE eorþe > earth; OE liornian, leornian > to learn
e; eo; occ. y; ē+CC; ēo+CC; occ. ǣ+CC,ēa+CC	/e/	(occ. +r) er	/ɛr/	/ər/ > GA /ər/, RP /ɜː/	OE +CC	OE hērde (WS hīerde) > heard
e; eo; occ. y; ē+CC; ēo+CC; occ. ǣ+CC,ēa+CC	(leng.) /ɛː/	ea,eCV	/eː/	/iː/, [ɪi]		OE specan > to speak; OE mete > meat; OE beofor > beaver; OE meotan (WS metan) > to mete /miːt/; OE eotan (WS etan) > to eat; OE meodu (WS medu) > mead; OE yfel > evil
e; eo; occ. y; ē+CC; ēo+CC; occ. ǣ+CC,ēa+CC	(leng.) /ɛː/	ea,eCV	/eː/	(+r) /iːr/ > GA /ɪr/, RP /ɪə/		OE spere > spear; OE mere > mere (lake)
e; eo; occ. y; ē+CC; ēo+CC; occ. ǣ+CC,ēa+CC	(leng.) /ɛː/	ea,eCV	/eː/	(occ.) /eɪ/		OE brecan > to break /breɪk/
e; eo; occ. y; ē+CC; ēo+CC; occ. ǣ+CC,ēa+CC	(leng.) /ɛː/	ea,eCV	/eː/	(occ. +r) /eːr/ > GA /ɛr/, RP /ɛə/		OE beoran (WS beran) > to bear; OE pere, peru > pear; OE swerian > to swear; OE wer man > were-
e; eo; occ. y; ē+CC; ēo+CC; occ. ǣ+CC,ēa+CC	(leng.) /ɛː/	ea,eCV	/eː/	(often +th,d,t,v) /ɛ/		OE leþer > leather /lɛðɚ/; OE stede > stead; OE weder > weather; OE heofon > heaven; OE hefiġ > heavy
i; y; ī+CC,ȳ+CC; occ. ēoc,ēc; occ. ī+CV,ȳ+CV	/i/	i	/ɪ/	/ɪ/	OE i	OE writen > written; OE sittan > to sit; OE fisċ > fish; OE lifer > liver
i; y; ī+CC,ȳ+CC; occ. ēoc,ēc; occ. ī+CV,ȳ+CV	/i/	i	/ɪ/	/ɪ/	OE y	OE bryċġ > bridge; OE cyssan > to kiss; OE dyde > did; OE synn > sin; OE gyldan > to gild; OE bysiġ > busy /ˈbɪzi/
i; y; ī+CC,ȳ+CC; occ. ēoc,ēc; occ. ī+CV,ȳ+CV	/i/	i	/ɪ/	/ɪ/	OE +CC	OE wīsdōm > wisdom; OE fīftiġ > fifty; OE wȳsċan > to wish; OE cȳþþ(u) > kith; OE fȳst > fist
i; y; ī+CC,ȳ+CC; occ. ēoc,ēc; occ. ī+CV,ȳ+CV	/i/	i	/ɪ/	/ɪ/	OE ȳ+CV,ī+CV	OE ċīcen > chicken; OE lȳtel > little
i; y; ī+CC,ȳ+CC; occ. ēoc,ēc; occ. ī+CV,ȳ+CV	/i/	i	/ɪ/	/ɪ/	OE ēoc,ēc	OE sēoc > sick; OE wēoce > wick; OE ēc + nama > ME eke-name >! nickname
i; y; ī+CC,ȳ+CC; occ. ēoc,ēc; occ. ī+CV,ȳ+CV	/i/	i	/ɪ/	(+r) /ər/ > GA /ər/, RP /ɜː/		OE gyrdan > to gird; OE fyrst > first; OE styrian > to stir
i; y; ī+CC,ȳ+CC; occ. ēoc,ēc; occ. ī+CV,ȳ+CV	(leng. — occ.) /eː/	ee	/iː/	/iː/, [ɪi]		OE wicu > week; OE pilian > to peel; OE bitela > beetle
o; ō+CC	/o/	o	/ɔ/	GA /ɑ/, RP /ɒ/	OE o	OE god > god; OE beġeondan > beyond
o; ō+CC	/o/	o	/ɔ/	GA /ɑ/, RP /ɒ/	OE +CC	OE gōdspell > gospel; OE fōddor > fodder; OE fōstrian > to foster
o; ō+CC	/o/	o	/ɔ/	(GA, +f,s,th,g,ng) /ɔː/		OE moþþe > moth; OE cros > cross; OE frost > frost; OE of > off; OE oft > oft; OE sōfte > soft
o; ō+CC	/o/	o	/ɔ/	(+r) /ɔr/ > GA /ɔr/, RP /ɔː/		OE corn > corn; OE storc > storc; OE storm > storm
o; ō+CC	(leng.) /ɔː/	oa,oCV	/oː/	GA /oʊ/, RP /əʊ/		OE fola > foal; OE nosu > nose; OE ofer > over
o; ō+CC	(leng.) /ɔː/	oa,oCV	/oː/	(+r) /oːr/ > GA /ɔr/, RP /ɔː/		OE borian > to bore; OE fore > fore; OE bord > board
u; occ. y; ū+CC; w+ e,eo,o,y +r	/u/	u,o	/ʊ/	/ʌ/	OE u	OE bucc > buck /bʌk/; OE lufian > to love /lʌv/; OE uppe > up; OE on bufan > above
u; occ. y; ū+CC; w+ e,eo,o,y +r	/u/	u,o	/ʊ/	/ʌ/	OE y	OE myċel > ME muchel >! much; OE blysċan > to blush; OE cyċġel > cudgel; OE clyċċan > to clutch; OE sċytel > shuttle
u; occ. y; ū+CC; w+ e,eo,o,y +r	/u/	u,o	/ʊ/	/ʌ/	OE +CC	OE dūst > dust; OE tūsc > tusk; OE rūst > rust
u; occ. y; ū+CC; w+ e,eo,o,y +r	/u/	u,o	/ʊ/	(b,f,p+ and +l,sh) /ʊ/		OE full > full /fʊl/; OE bula > bull; OE bysċ > bush
u; occ. y; ū+CC; w+ e,eo,o,y +r	/u/	u,o	/ʊ/	(+r) /ər/ > GA /ər/, RP /ɜː/	OE u	OE spurnan > to spurn
u; occ. y; ū+CC; w+ e,eo,o,y +r	/u/	u,o	/ʊ/	(+r) /ər/ > GA /ər/, RP /ɜː/	OE y	OE ċyriċe > church; OE byrþen > burden; OE hyrdel > hurdle
u; occ. y; ū+CC; w+ e,eo,o,y +r	/u/	u,o	/ʊ/	(+r) /ər/ > GA /ər/, RP /ɜː/	OE w+,+r	OE word > word; OE werc (WS weorc) > work; OE werold > world; OE wyrm > worm; OE wersa (WS wiersa) > worse; OE weorþ > worth
u; occ. y; ū+CC; w+ e,eo,o,y +r	(leng. — occ.) /oː/	oo	/uː/	/uː/, [ʊu]		OE (brȳd)-guma > ME (bride)-gome >! (bride)-groom
u; occ. y; ū+CC; w+ e,eo,o,y +r	(leng. — occ.) /oː/	oo	/uː/	(+r) /uːr/ > /oːr/ > GA /ɔr/, RP /ɔː/		OE duru > door
u; occ. y; ū+CC; w+ e,eo,o,y +r	(leng. — occ.) /oː/	oo	/uː/	(often +th,d,t) /ʌ/		?
u; occ. y; ū+CC; w+ e,eo,o,y +r	(leng. — occ.) /oː/	oo	/uː/	(occ. +th,d,t) /ʊ/		OE wudu > wood /wʊd/
ā; often a+ld,mb	/ɔː/	oa,oCV	/oː/	GA /oʊ/, RP /əʊ/	OE ā	OE āc > oak; OE hāl > whole
ā; often a+ld,mb	/ɔː/	oa,oCV	/oː/	GA /oʊ/, RP /əʊ/	OE +ld,mb	OE camb > comb; OE ald (WS eald) > old; OE haldan (WS healdan) > to hold
ā; often a+ld,mb	/ɔː/	oa,oCV	/oː/	(+r) /oːr/ > GA /ɔr/, RP /ɔː/		OE ār > oar, ore; OE māra > more; OE bār > boar; OE sār > sore
ǣ; ēa	/ɛː/	ea,eCV	/eː/	/iː/, [ɪi]	OE ǣ	OE hǣlan > to heal /hiːl/; OE hǣtu > heat; OE hwǣte > wheat
ǣ; ēa	/ɛː/	ea,eCV	/eː/	/iː/, [ɪi]	OE ēa	OE bēatan > to beat /biːt/; OE lēaf > leaf; OE ċēap > cheap
ǣ; ēa	/ɛː/	ea,eCV	/eː/	(+r) /iːr/ > GA /ɪr/, RP /ɪə/		OE rǣran > to rear ; OE ēare > ear; OE sēar > sere; OE sēarian > to sear
ǣ; ēa	/ɛː/	ea,eCV	/eː/	(occ.) /eɪ/		OE grēat > great /greɪt/
ǣ; ēa	/ɛː/	ea,eCV	/eː/	(occ. +r) /eːr/ > GA /ɛr/, RP /ɛə/		OE ǣr > ere (before)
ǣ; ēa	/ɛː/	ea,eCV	/eː/	(often +th,d,t) /ɛ/	OE ǣ	OE brǣþ odor > breath; OE swǣtan > to sweat; OE sprǣdan > to spread
ǣ; ēa	/ɛː/	ea,eCV	/eː/	(often +th,d,t) /ɛ/	OE ēa	OE dēad > dead /dɛd/; OE dēaþ death; OE þrēat menace > threat; OE rēad > red; OE dēaf > deaf
ē; ēo; often e+ld	/eː/	ee,ie(nd/ld)	/iː/	/iː/, [ɪi]	OE ē	OE fēdan > to feed; OE grēdiġ (WS grǣdiġ) > greedy; OE mē > me; OE fēt > feet; OE dēd (WS dǣd) > deed; OE nēdl (WS nǣdl) > needle
ē; ēo; often e+ld	/eː/	ee,ie(nd/ld)	/iː/	/iː/, [ɪi]	OE ēo	OE dēop deep; OE fēond > fiend; OE betwēonum > between; OE bēon > to be
ē; ēo; often e+ld	/eː/	ee,ie(nd/ld)	/iː/	/iː/, [ɪi]	OE +ld	OE feld > field; OE ġeldan (WS ġieldan) to pay > to yield
ē; ēo; often e+ld	(often +r) /ɛːr/	ear,erV	/eːr/	/iːr/ > GA /ɪr/, RP /ɪə/	OE ē	OE hēr > here; OE hēran (WS hīeran) > to hear; OE fēr (WS fǣr) > fear
ē; ēo; often e+ld	(often +r) /ɛːr/	ear,erV	/eːr/	/iːr/ > GA /ɪr/, RP /ɪə/	OE ēo	OE dēore (WS dīere) > dear
ē; ēo; often e+ld	(often +r) /ɛːr/	ear,erV	/eːr/	(occ.) /eːr/ > GA /ɛr/, RP /ɛə/		OE þēr (WS þǣr) > there; OE hwēr (WS hwǣr) > where
ē; ēo; often e+ld	(occ. +r) /eːr/	eer	/iːr/	/iːr/ > GA /ɪr/, RP /ɪə/		OE bēor > beer; OE dēor > deer; OE stēran (WS stīeran) > to steer; OE bēr (WS bǣr) > bier
ī; ȳ; often i+ld,mb,nd; often y+ld,mb,nd	/iː/	i,iCV	/əi/	/aɪ/	OE ī	OE rīdan > to ride; OE tīma > time; OE hwīt > white; OE mīn > mine (of me)
ī; ȳ; often i+ld,mb,nd; often y+ld,mb,nd	/iː/	i,iCV	/əi/	/aɪ/	OE ȳ	OE mȳs > mice; OE brȳd > bride; OE hȳdan > to hide
ī; ȳ; often i+ld,mb,nd; often y+ld,mb,nd	/iː/	i,iCV	/əi/	/aɪ/	OE +ld,mb,nd	OE findan > to find; OE ċild > child; OE climban > to climb; OE mynd > mind
ī; ȳ; often i+ld,mb,nd; often y+ld,mb,nd	/iː/	i,iCV	/əi/	(+r) /air/ > GA /aɪr/, RP /aɪə/		OE fȳr > fire; OE hȳrian > to hire; OE wīr > wire
ō; occ. ēo	/oː/	oo	/uː/	/uː/, [ʊu]	OE ō	OE mōna > moon; OE sōna > soon; OE fōd > food /fuːd/; OE dōn > to do
ō; occ. ēo	/oː/	oo	/uː/	/uː/, [ʊu]	OE ēo	OE ċēosan > to choose; OE sċēotan > to shoot
ō; occ. ēo	/oː/	oo	/uː/	(+r) /uːr/ > /oːr/ > GA /ɔr/, RP /ɔː/		OE flōr > floor; OE mōr > moor
ō; occ. ēo	/oː/	oo	/uː/	(occ. +th,d,v) /ʌ/		OE blōd > blood /blʌd/; OE mōdor > mother /mʌðə(r)/; OE glōf > glove /glʌv/
ō; occ. ēo	/oː/	oo	/uː/	(often +th,d,t,k) /ʊ/		OE gōd > good /gʊd/; OE bōc > book /bʊk/; OE lōcian > to look /lʊk/; OE fōt > foot /fʊt/
ū; often u+nd	/uː/	ou	/əu/	/aʊ/	OE ū	OE mūs > mouse; OE ūt, ūte > out; OE hlūd > loud
ū; often u+nd	/uː/	ou	/əu/	/aʊ/	OE +nd	OE ġefunden > found; OE hund > hound; OE ġesund > sound (safe)
ū; often u+nd	/uː/	ou	/əu/	(+r) /aur/ > GA /aʊr/, RP /aʊə/	OE	OE ūre > our; OE sċūr > shower; OE sūr > sour
ū; often u+nd	/uː/	ou	/əu/	(occ. +t) /ʌ/		OE būtan > but; OE strūtian > ME strouten > to strut

==== Diphthongs ====
This table describes the main developments of Middle English diphthongs, starting with the Old English sound sequences that produced them (sequences of vowels and g, h or ƿ) and ending with their Modern English equivalents. Many special cases have been ignored.

Note: V means "any vowel"; C means "any consonant"; # means "end of word".

Late Old English (Anglian)	Early Middle English	Late Middle English	Early Modern English	Modern English	Example (Old and Modern English forms given)
æġ, ǣġ	/ai/	/ai/ [æi]	/eː/	/eɪ/	dæġ > day; mæġ > may; mæġden > maiden; næġl > nail; fæġer > fair; clǣġ > clay; grǣġ > gray
eġ, ēġ#	/ɛi/	/ai/ [æi]	/eː/	/eɪ/	weġ > way; pleġan > to play; reġn > rain; leġer > lair; leġde > laid; hēġ (WS hīeġ) > hay
ēġV	/ei/ > /iː/	/iː/	/əi/	/aɪ/	ēage > ēġe > eye; lēogan > lēġan > to lie (deceive); flēoge > flēġe > fly
iġ, īġ, yġ, ȳġ	/iː/	/iː/	/əi/	/aɪ/	tiġel > tile; liġe > (I) lie ("recline"); hīġian > to hie; ryġe > rye; byġe > (I) buy; drȳġe > dry
æw, aw, agV	/au/	/au/	/ɔː/	/ɔː/	clawu > claw; lagu > law; dragan > to draw
ǣw, ēaw, ew, eow	/ɛu/	/ɛu/	/juː/	/(j)uː/	mǣw > mew; lǣwede > lewd; scrēawa > shrew; dēaw > dew
ēw, ēow	/eu/	/iu/	/juː/	/(j)uː/	ċēowan > to chew; hrēowan > to rue; blēow > blew; trēowþ > truth
iw, īw, yw, ȳw	/iu/	/iu/	/juː/	/(j)uː/	hīw > hue; nīwe > new; trīewe (WS) > true; Tīwesdæġ > Tiwesdæġ > Tuesday
āw, āgV, ow, ogV, ōw, ōgV	/ɔu/	/ɔu/	/ou/ > /oː/	/əʊ/ (British), /oʊ/ (American)	cnāwan > to know; crāwa > crow; snāw > snow; sāwol > soul; āgan > to owe; āgen > own; grōwan > to grow; blōwen > blown; boga > bow /bou/; flogen > flown
ugV, ūgV	/uː/	/uː/	/əu/	/aʊ/	fugol > fowl; drugaþ > drouth > drought; būgan > to bow /baʊ/
æh, ah, ag#	/auh/	/auh/	([x] > ∅) /ɔː/	/ɔː/	slæht (WS sleaht) + -or > slaughter
æh, ah, ag#	/auh/	/auh/	([x] > /f/) /af/	/æf/, /ɑːf/	hlæhtor > laughter
eh	/ɛih/	/ɛih/	/ei/ > /eː/	/eɪ/	streht > straight
ēh	/eih/ > /iːh/	/iːh/	/əi/	/aɪ/	hēah > hēh > high; þēoh > þēh > thigh; nēh > nigh
ih, īh, yh, ȳh	/iːh/	/iːh/	/əi/	/aɪ/	reht > riht > right; flyht > flight; līoht > līht > light
āh, āg#, oh, og#	/ɔuh/	/ɔuh/	([x] > ∅) /ou/ > /oː/	/əʊ/ (British), /oʊ/ (American)	dāg > dāh > dough
āh, āg#, oh, og#	/ɔuh/	/ɔuh/	([x] > /f/) /ɔf/	/ɒf/, /ɔːf/	trog > trough
āhC, ohC, ōhC	/ɔuh/	/ɔuh/	/ɔː/	/ɔː/	āhte > ought; dohtor > daughter; þoht > thought; sōhte > sought
ōh#, ōg#	/ouh/ > /uːh/	/uːh/	([x] > ∅) /əu/	/aʊ/	bōg > bough; plōg > plōh > plough
ōh#, ōg#	/ouh/ > /uːh/	/uːh/	([x] > /f/) /ʊf/	(centralized) /ʌf/	ġenōg, ġenōh > enough; tōh > tough; ruh > rough
uh, ug#, ūh, ūg#	/uːh/	/uːh/	([x] > /f/) /ʊf/	(non-centralized) /ʊf/	Weōcetun > Woughton

=== Development of Old English vowels ===
This table describes the main changes from Late Proto-Indo-European and Proto-Germanic up through Old English, Middle English and Modern English. It focuses on the Old English and Middle English changes leading to the modern forms. Other tables are also available to cover specific areas in more detail:

- A table specifically covering the vowel history from Proto-Germanic to Old English.
- A table specifically covering the vowel history from Old English to Modern English, providing particular detail about the Modern English developments.
- A table specifically focusing on the history of Middle English diphthongs, covering the period from Old English to Modern English.

This table only describes the changes in accented syllables. Vowel changes in unaccented syllables were very different and much more extensive. In general:

1. In Old English, long vowels were reduced to short vowels (and sometimes deleted entirely) and short vowels were very often deleted. All remaining vowels were reduced to only the vowels /u/, /a/ and /e/, and sometimes /o/. (/o/ also sometimes appears as a variant of unstressed /u/.)
2. In Middle English, almost all unstressed vowels were reduced to /ə/; then, final /ə/ was dropped. The main exception is Old English -iġ, which becomes Modern English -y.
3. Unstressed vowels in Modern English other than those spelled ⟨e⟩ are due either to compounds or to borrowed words (especially from Latin and Old French).

NOTE: The Old English words in this table are given in their Anglian form, since this is the form that underlies Modern English. However, standard Old English was based on the West Saxon dialect, and when the two dialects differ, the West Saxon form is indicated with a WS in parentheses following the Anglian form.

NOTE: In this table, abbreviations are used as follows:

- PIE = Proto-Indo-European
- PreG = Pre-Germanic^{1}
- PG = Proto-Germanic
- OE = Old English
- WS = West Saxon (dialect of Old English)
- ME = Middle English
- NE = Modern English
- GA = General American (dialect of Modern English)
- RP = Received Pronunciation (British dialect of Modern English)
- indic. = indicative
- leng. = lengthened by open-syllable lengthening
- occ. = occasionally
- plur. = plural
- pres. = present
- sing. = singular
- superl. = superlative
- > = produces by regular sound change
- >! = produces by analogy or irregular change

^{1}"Pre-Germanic" in this context refers to a post-PIE language that maintains PIE phonology but with morphological adjustments made as necessary to account for the Proto-Germanic form. Reconstructions are only given for solidly reconstructible Proto-Indo-European roots.

Late PIE^{1}	Proto-Germanic^{1}	Condition	Old English		Middle English		Modern English		Examples
Late PIE^{1}	Proto-Germanic^{1}	Condition		i-umlaut^{2}		i-umlaut^{2}		i-umlaut^{2}	Examples
a, o, *h₂e, h₃e, H̥	a		æ	e	/a/	/e/	/æ/; RP /ɑː/	/ɛ/	PG *paþaz > OE pæþ > "path"; PG *batizǫ̂ > OE betera > "better"; PG *taljaną > OE tellan > "to tell"
a, o, *h₂e, h₃e, H̥	a		æ	e	(leng.) /aː/	/ɛː/	/eɪ/	/iː/; /eɪ/; /ɛ/	PG *hwalaz > OE hwæl > "whale"; PG *matiz > OE, ME mete "food" > "meat"; PG *stadiz > OE, ME stede > "stead"
a, o, *h₂e, h₃e, H̥	a		æ	e	(+g) /ai/	/ɛi/ > /ai/	/eɪ/	/eɪ/	PG *dagaz > OE dæġ > "day"
a, o, *h₂e, h₃e, H̥	a		æ	e	(+h) /au/	/ɛu/	/ɔː/; /æf/	/(j)uː/	PG *hlahtraz > OE hlæhtor (WS hleahtor) > "laughter"; PG *slahtiz > OE sleht (WS slieht) > ME sleight "slaughter"
a, o, *h₂e, h₃e, H̥	a	+n,m	a,o	e	/a/ (occ. /o/)	/e/	/æ/; occ. GA /ɔ/, RP /ɒ/	/ɛ/	PG *mannz, manniz > OE man, mon > "man", plur. men > "men"; PG *hamuraz > OE hamor > "hammer"; PG *handuz > OE hand > "hand"; PG *sange > OE past sang > "sang"; PG *lambaz > OE lamb > "lamb"; Latin candēla > OE candel > "candle"; PG *gandrǫ̂ > OE gandra > "gander"; PG *langaz > OE lang, long > "long"; PG *sandijaną > OE sendan > "send"; PG *bankiz > OE benċ > "bench"; PG *hanjō > OE henn > "hen"
a, o, *h₂e, h₃e, H̥	a	+n,m	a,o	e	(leng.) /aː/	/ɛː/	/eɪ/	/iː/; /eɪ/; /ɛ/	PG *namǫ̂ > OE nama > "name"; PG lamǫ̂ > OE lama > "lame"; PG *banǫ̂ > OE bana "slayer" > "bane"
a, o, *h₂e, h₃e, H̥	a	+mf,nþ,ns	ō	ē	/oː/	/eː/	/uː/; /ʌ/; /ʊ/	/iː/	PreG *donts, dontes > PG *tanþz, tanþiz > OE tōþ > "tooth", plur. tēþ > "teeth"; PG *gans, gansiz > OE gōs > "goose", plur. gēs > "geese"; PG *anþaraz > OE ōþer > "other"
a, o, *h₂e, h₃e, H̥	a	+mf,nþ,ns	ō	ē	(+CC) /o/	/e/	GA /ɔ/, RP /ɒ/; GA /ɔː/	/ɛ/	PG *samftijaz, samftô > OE sēfte, *sōfta >! OE sōfte > "soft"; PG *anstiz > OE ēst "favor" > ME "este"
a, o, *h₂e, h₃e, H̥	a	+lC	a	æ > e	/a/	/e/	/ɔː/	/ɛ/	PG *fallaną > OE fallan (WS feallan) > "to fall"; PG *fallijaną > OE fællan > fellan (WS fiellan) > "to fell"
a, o, *h₂e, h₃e, H̥	a	+lC	a	æ > e	(+ld) /ɔː/	/ɛː/	GA /oʊ/, RP /əʊ/	/iː/; /eɪ/; /ɛ/	PG *aldaz, aldizǫ̂ > OE ald (WS eald) > "old", ældra (WS ieldra) "older" > "elder"; PG *haldaną > OE haldan (WS healdan) > "to hold"
a, o, *h₂e, h₃e, H̥	a	+rc,rg,rh	æ > e	e	/e/	/e/	GA /ɑ/(+r), RP /ɑː/	GA /ɑ/(+r), RP /ɑː/	Latin arca > OE erc (WS earc) > "ark"
a, o, *h₂e, h₃e, H̥	a	+rC (C not c,g,h)	ea	e	/a/	/e/	GA /ɑ/(+r), RP /ɑː/	GA /ɑ/(+r), RP /ɑː/	PG *harduz > OE heard > "hard"
a, o, *h₂e, h₃e, H̥	a	before a,o,u	a	(by analogy) æ	/a/	/a/	/æ/; RP /ɑː/	/æ/; (RP) /ɑː/	Latin cattus > OE catt > "cat"
a, o, *h₂e, h₃e, H̥	a	before a,o,u	a	(by analogy) æ	(leng.) /aː/	/aː/	/eɪ/	/eɪ/	PG *talō > OE talu > "tale"; PG *bakaną, -iþi > OE bacan > "to bake", 3rd sing. pres. indic. bæcþ "bakes"
a, o, *h₂e, h₃e, H̥	a	before a,o,u	a	(by analogy) æ	(+g,w) /au/	/au/	/ɔː/	/ɔː/	PG plur. *dagôs > OE dagas "days" > dial. "dawes"; PG *laguz > OE lagu > "law"; PG *clawō > OE clawu > "claw"
a, o, *h₂e, h₃e, H̥	a	before later a,o,u	ea	eo	/a/	/e/	/æ/; (RP) /ɑː/	/ɛ/	
a, o, *h₂e, h₃e, H̥	a	before later a,o,u	ea	eo	(leng.) /aː/	/ɛː/	/eɪ/	/iː/; /eɪ/; /ɛ/	PG *alu(þ) > OE ealu > "ale"; PG *asiluz > OE eosol (WS esol) "donkey"
a, o, *h₂e, h₃e, H̥	a	before later a,o,u	ea	eo	(+g,w) /au/	/ɛu/	/ɔː/	/(j)uː/	PG *awī > OE eowu > "ewe"
a, o, *h₂e, h₃e, H̥	a	before hs,ht,hþ + final -iz	N/A	i (occ. ie)	N/A	/i/	N/A	/aɪ/	PIE *nokwtis > PG *nahtiz > OE nieht > OE niht > "night"
e, *h₁e, occ. i+C^{*}e,a,o	e		e	N/A	/e/	N/A	/ɛ/	N/A	PIE *nizdos > PG *nestaz > OE nest > "nest"; PG *helpaną > OE helpan > "to help"; PG *fehtaną > OE fehtan (WS feohtan) "to fight" (irreg.); PG *berkaną > OE bercan (WS beorcan) > "to bark"
e, *h₁e, occ. i+C^{*}e,a,o	e		e	N/A	(leng.) /ɛː/	N/A	/iː/; /eɪ/; /ɛ/	N/A	PG *brekaną > OE brecan > "to break"; PG *ebnaz > OE ef(e)n > "even"; OE feþer > "feather"
e, *h₁e, occ. i+C^{*}e,a,o	e		e	N/A	(+g,h) /ɛi/ > /aɪ/	N/A	/eɪ/	N/A	PG *wegaz > OE weġ > "way"; PG *regnaz > OE reġn > "rain"; PG *seglaz > OE seġl > "sail"
e, *h₁e, occ. i+C^{*}e,a,o	e		e	N/A	(+ld) /eː/	N/A	/iː/	N/A	PG *felduz > OE feld > "field"; PG *geldaną > OE ġeldan (WS ġieldan) "to pay" > "to yield"
e, *h₁e, occ. i+C^{*}e,a,o	e	+m	i	N/A	/i/	N/A	/ɪ/	N/A	PG *remǫ̂ > OE rima > "rim"; PG *nemaną > OE niman "to take" > archaic "to nim"
e, *h₁e, occ. i+C^{*}e,a,o	e	+m	i	N/A	(leng.) /eː/	N/A	/iː/	N/A	
e, *h₁e, occ. i+C^{*}e,a,o	e	+rC (C not c,g,h); wV; C (C not c,g) +later a,o,u	eo	N/A	/e/	N/A	/ɛ/; (+r) GA /ɑ/(+r), RP /ɑː/	N/A	PG *werþaną > OE weorðan "to become"; PG *hertǭ > OE heorte > "heart"
e, *h₁e, occ. i+C^{*}e,a,o	e	+rC (C not c,g,h); wV; C (C not c,g) +later a,o,u	eo	N/A	(leng.) /ɛː/	N/A	/iː/; /eɪ/; /ɛ/	N/A	PG *etaną > OE eotan (WS etan) > "to eat"; PG *beraną > OE beoran (WS beran) > "to bear"
e, *h₁e, occ. i+C^{*}e,a,o	e	+rC (C not c,g,h); wV; C (C not c,g) +later a,o,u	eo	N/A	(+w) /ɛu/	N/A	/(j)uː/	N/A	
e, *h₁e, occ. i+C^{*}e,a,o	e	+ late final hs,ht,hþ	i (occ. ie)	N/A	/i/	N/A	/ɪ/	N/A	PG *sehs > OE siex > "six"; PG *rehtaz > OE riht > "right"
i, (h₁)e+C^{*}i, (h₁)e+C^{*}y, (h₁)e+nC	i		i	i	/i/	/i/	/ɪ/	/ɪ/	PG *fiską > OE fisċ > "fish"; PG *hringaz > OE hring > "ring"; PG *bidjaną > OE biddan "to pray" > "to bid"; PG *itiþi > OE 3rd sing. pres. indic. iteþ "eats"; PG *skiriþi > OE 3rd sing. pres. indic. sċirþ (WS sċierþ) "shears"; PG *stihtōjaną > OE stihtian "to establish"
i, (h₁)e+C^{*}i, (h₁)e+C^{*}y, (h₁)e+nC	i		i	i	(leng.) /eː/	/eː/	/iː/	/iː/	PG *wikō > OE wicu > "week"
i, (h₁)e+C^{*}i, (h₁)e+C^{*}y, (h₁)e+nC	i		i	i	(+g) /iː/	/iː/	/aɪ/	/aɪ/	Latin tegula > OE tiġele > "tile"; PG *brigdilaz > OE briġdel > "bridle"
i, (h₁)e+C^{*}i, (h₁)e+C^{*}y, (h₁)e+nC	i		i	i	(+ld,nd) /iː/	/iː/	/aɪ/	/aɪ/	PG *blindaz > OE blind > "blind" /blaɪnd/; PG *kildaz (plur. *kildōzō) OE ċild > "child" /tʃaɪld/; PG *wildijaz > OE wilde > "wild" /waɪld/
i, (h₁)e+C^{*}i, (h₁)e+C^{*}y, (h₁)e+nC	i	+ mf,nþ,ns	ī	ī	/iː/	/iː/	/aɪ/	/aɪ/	PG *fimf > OE fīf > "five"; PG *linþijō > OE līþe "gentle" > "lithe"
i, (h₁)e+C^{*}i, (h₁)e+C^{*}y, (h₁)e+nC	i	+ mf,nþ,ns	ī	ī	(+CC) /i/	/i/	/ɪ/	/ɪ/	PG *fimf tigiwiz > OE fīftiġ > "fifty"
i, (h₁)e+C^{*}i, (h₁)e+C^{*}y, (h₁)e+nC	i	+rC (C not c,g,h); w	io > eo	i	/e/	/i/	/ɛ/	/ɪ/	PG *liznōjaną > OE liornian > OE leornian > "learn"; PG *a + firrijaną > OE afirran (WS afierran) "to remove" (cf. feorr "far")
i, (h₁)e+C^{*}i, (h₁)e+C^{*}y, (h₁)e+nC	i	+rC (C not c,g,h); w	io > eo	i	(+w) /eu/ > /iu/	/iu/	/(j)uː/	/(j)uː/	PG *niwulaz > OE niowul, neowul "prostrate"; PG *spiwiz > OE spiwe "vomiting"; PG *hiwiz > OE hīw > "hue"
i, (h₁)e+C^{*}i, (h₁)e+C^{*}y, (h₁)e+nC	i	before a,o,u	i (io, eo)	N/A	/i/ (/e/)	N/A	/ɪ/ (/ɛ/)	N/A	PG *milukz > OE mioluc,meolc > "milk"
i, (h₁)e+C^{*}i, (h₁)e+C^{*}y, (h₁)e+nC	i	before a,o,u	i (io, eo)	N/A	(leng.) /eː/ (/ɛː/)	N/A	/iː/ (/iː/; /eɪ/; /ɛ/)	N/A	
i, (h₁)e+C^{*}i, (h₁)e+C^{*}y, (h₁)e+nC	i	before a,o,u	i (io, eo)	N/A	(+g) /iː/ (/ɛi/ > /ai/)	/iː/	/ai/ (/eɪ/)	/aɪ/	
u, *n̥(H), *m̥(H), *l̥(H), *r̥(H)^{3}	u		u	y	/u/	/i/	/ʌ/; /ʊ/	/ɪ/	PG *sunuz > OE sunu > "son"; PG *kumaną, -iþi > OE cuman > "to come", 3rd sing. pres. indic. cymþ "comes"; PG *guldijaną > OE gyldan > "to gild"
u, *n̥(H), *m̥(H), *l̥(H), *r̥(H)^{3}	u		u	y	(leng.) /oː/	/eː/	/uː/; /ʌ/; /ʊ/; (+r) GA /ɔr/, RP /ɔː/	/iː/	PreG *dhurus > PG *duruz > OE duru > "door"; PG *widuz > OE widu >! OE wudu > "wood"; PG *ubilaz > OE yfel > "evil"
u, *n̥(H), *m̥(H), *l̥(H), *r̥(H)^{3}	u		u	y	(+g) /uː/	/iː/	/aʊ/	/aɪ/	OE ryġe > "rye"
u, *n̥(H), *m̥(H), *l̥(H), *r̥(H)^{3}	u		u	y	(+w) /uː/	/iu/	/aʊ/	/(j)uː/	
u, *n̥(H), *m̥(H), *l̥(H), *r̥(H)^{3}	u	+ mf,nþ,ns	ū	ȳ	/uː/	/iː/	/aʊ/	/aɪ/	PG *munþz > OE mūþ > "mouth"; PG *kunþijaną > OE cȳþan "to make known" > ME "kithe"
u, *n̥(H), *m̥(H), *l̥(H), *r̥(H)^{3}	u	+ mf,nþ,ns	ū	ȳ	(+CC) /u/	/i/	/ʌ/; /ʊ/	/ɪ/	PG *tunskaz > OE tūsc > "tusk"; PG *wunskijaną > OE wȳsċan > "wish"; PG *kunþiþō > OE cȳþþ(u) > "kith"
u, *n̥(H), *m̥(H), *l̥(H), *r̥(H)^{3}	u	before non-nasal + a,e,o	o	(by analogy) e	/o/	/e/	GA /ɔ/, RP /ɒ/	/ɛ/	PG *drupǫ̂ > OE dropa > "drop"; PG *fulką > OE folc > "folk"
u, *n̥(H), *m̥(H), *l̥(H), *r̥(H)^{3}	u	before non-nasal + a,e,o	o	(by analogy) e	(leng.) /ɔː/	/ɛː/	GA /oʊ/, RP /əʊ/; (+r) GA /ɔr/, RP /ɔː/	/iː/; /eɪ/; /ɛ/	PG *fulǫ̂ > OE fola > "foal"; PG *nusuz (*nusōu?) > OE nosu > "nose"; PG *hupōjaną > OE hopian > "to hope"
u, *n̥(H), *m̥(H), *l̥(H), *r̥(H)^{3}	u	before non-nasal + a,e,o	o	(by analogy) e	(+g,h,w) /ɔu/	/ɛi/ > /ai/	GA /oʊ/, RP /əʊ/; GA /ɔːf/, RP /ɒf/	/eɪ/	PG *duhter, duhtriz > OE dohter > "daughter", plur. dehter "daughters"; PG *trugaz > OE trog > "trough"; PG *bugǫ̂ > OE boga > "bow" /boʊ/
u, *n̥(H), *m̥(H), *l̥(H), *r̥(H)^{3}	u	before non-nasal + a,e,o	o	(by analogy) e	(+ld,rd) /ɔː/	/ɛː/	GA /oʊ/, RP /əʊ/; (+r) GA /ɔr/, RP /ɔː/	/iː/; /eɪ/; /ɛ/	PG *guldaz > OE gold > "gold"; PG *burdą > OE bord > "board"
ē(H), eh₁	ǣ > ā		ē	ē	/eː/	/eː/	/iː/	/iː/	PG *slǣpaną > OE slēpan (WS slǣpan) > "to sleep", Latin strāta > OE strēt (WS strǣt) > "street"; PG *dǣdiz > OE dēd (WS dǣd) > "deed"; Latin cāseus > OE ċēse (WS ċīese) > "cheese"
ē(H), eh₁	ǣ > ā		ē	ē	(+CC) /e/	/e/	/ɛ/	/ɛ/	
ē(H), eh₁	ǣ > ā		ē	ē	(+g,h) /iː/	/iː/	/aɪ/	/aɪ/	PG *nǣhaz, nǣhistaz > OE nēh (WS nēah) "near" > "nigh", superl. nēhst (WS nīehst) "nearest" > "next"
ē(H), eh₁	ǣ > ā	+n,m	ō	ē	/oː/	/eː/	/uː/	/iː/	PG *mǣnǫ̂ > OE mōna > "moon"; PG *kwǣniz > OE kwēn > "queen"
ē(H), eh₁	ǣ > ā	+w; ga,go,gu	ā	ǣ	/ɔː/	/ɛː/	GA /oʊ/, RP /əʊ/	/iː/; /eɪ/; /ɛ/	
ē(H), eh₁	ǣ > ā	+w; ga,go,gu	ā	ǣ	(+g) /ɔu/	/ɛi/ > /ai/	GA /oʊ/, RP /əʊ/	/eɪ/	PG *mǣgôz > OE māgas "relatives"
ē(H), eh₁	ǣ > ā	+w; ga,go,gu	ā	ǣ	(+w) /ɔu/	/ɛu/	GA /oʊ/, RP /əʊ/	/(j)uː/	PG *knǣwaną, -iþi > OE cnāwan > "to know", 3rd sing. pres. indic. cnǣwþ "knows"
ēi, iz, etc.^{4}	ē		ē	ē	/eː/	/eː/	/iː/	/iː/	PG *hēr > OE hēr > "here"; PIE *mizdhā > PG *mēdō > OE mēd "reward"
ēi, iz, etc.^{4}	ē		ē	ē	(+g,h) /iː/	/iː/	/aɪ/	/aɪ/	OE past hēht "called" > "hight"
ēi, iz, etc.^{4}	ē		ē	ē	(+w) /eu/ > /iu/	/eu/ > /iu/	/(j)uː/	/(j)uː/	
ā, ō, aH, oH, eh₂, eh₃; an+K, on+K, h₂en+K, h₃en+K	ō; ą̄+h		ō	ē	/oː/	/eː/	/uː/; /ʌ/; /ʊ/	/iː/	PG *fōtz, fōtiz > OE fōt > "foot", plur. fēt > "feet"
ā, ō, aH, oH, eh₂, eh₃; an+K, on+K, h₂en+K, h₃en+K	ō; ą̄+h		ō	ē	(+CC) /o/	/e/	GA /ɔ/, RP /ɒ/; GA /ɔː/	/ɛ/	PG *kōpi-dǣþ > OE cēpte > "kept"; PG *mōti-dǣþ > OE mētte > "met"
ā, ō, aH, oH, eh₂, eh₃; an+K, on+K, h₂en+K, h₃en+K	ō; ą̄+h		ō	ē	(+g,h) /uː/	/iː/	/aʊ/; /ʌf/	/aɪ/	PG *swōganą > OE swōgan "to sound" > ME /suːə/ > "sough" /saʊ/; PG *bōgaz > OE bōg > ME /buːh/ > "bough" /baʊ/; PG *tōhaz > OE tōh > ME /tuːh/ > "tough" /tʌf/; PG past *sōh-dǣþ > OE sōhte > ME /sɔuhtə/ > "sought"
ā, ō, aH, oH, eh₂, eh₃; an+K, on+K, h₂en+K, h₃en+K	ō; ą̄+h		ō	ē	(+w) /ɔu/	/eu/ > /iu/	GA /oʊ/, RP /əʊ/	/(j)uː/	PG *grōwaną > OE grōwan > "grow"
(h₁)ei, ī, iH; (h₁)en+K, in+K	ī; į̄+h		ī	ī	/iː/	/iː/	/aɪ/	/aɪ/	PG *wībą > OE wīf > "wife"; PG *līhiþi > 3rd sing. pres. indic. līþ (WS līehþ) "lends"; PIE *lengwhtos > PG *lį̄htaz > OE līht (WS lēoht) > "light" (in weight)
(h₁)ei, ī, iH; (h₁)en+K, in+K	ī; į̄+h		ī	ī	(+CC) /i/	/i/	/ɪ/	/ɪ/	
(h₁)ei, ī, iH; (h₁)en+K, in+K	ī; į̄+h		ī	ī	(+g,h) /iː/	/iː/	/aɪ/	/aɪ/	PG *hīgōjaną > OE hīgian > "hie"
(h₁)ei, ī, iH; (h₁)en+K, in+K	ī; į̄+h		ī	ī	(+w) /iu/	/iu/	/(j)uː/	/(j)uː/	PG *Tīwaz > OE Tīw (name of a god) + -es "'s" + dæġ "day" > "Tuesday"
ū, uH; *n̥+K, un+K	ū; ų̄+h		ū	ȳ	/uː/	/iː/	/aʊ/	/aɪ/	PG *mūs, mūsiz > OE mūs "mouse", plur. mȳs > "mice"; PG *hūdijaną > OE hȳdan > "to hide"
ū, uH; *n̥+K, un+K	ū; ų̄+h		ū	ȳ	(+CC) /u/	/i/	/ʌ/; /ʊ/	/ɪ/	PG *rūstaz > OE rūst > "rust"; *pn̥kʷstis > PG *fų̄hstiz > OE fȳst > "fist"
ū, uH; *n̥+K, un+K	ū; ų̄+h		ū	ȳ	(+g,h) /uː/	/iː/	/aʊ/; /ʌf/	/aɪ/	PG *būganą > OE būgan "to bend" > "bow"; PG *rūhaz > OE rūh > "rough" /rʌf/; PG *drūgijaz > OE drȳge > "dry"
ū, uH; *n̥+K, un+K	ū; ų̄+h		ū	ȳ	(+w) /uː/	/iu/	/aʊ/	/(j)uː/	OE trūwian "to trust" > archaic "trow" /traʊ/
ai, oi, h₂ei, h₃ei	ai		ā	ǣ	/ɔː/	/ɛː/	GA /oʊ/, RP /əʊ/; (+r) GA /ɔr/, RP /ɔː/	/iː/; /eɪ/; /ɛ/	PG *stainaz > OE stān > "stone"; PreG perfect *roidhe > PG past *raide > OE rād > "rode"; PreG *oyerā > PG *airō > OE ār > "oar"; PIE *ayes > PG *aiz > OE ār "bronze" > "ore"; PG *hwaitiją > OE hwǣte > "wheat"
ai, oi, h₂ei, h₃ei	ai		ā	ǣ	(+CC) /a/	/a/	/æ/; RP /ɑː/	/æ/; RP /ɑː/	PG *faittiz > OE fǣtt > "fat"
ai, oi, h₂ei, h₃ei	ai		ā	ǣ	(+g,h) /ɔu/	/ɛi/ > /ai/	GA /oʊ/, RP /əʊ/	/eɪ/	PG *aiganą > OE āgan > "owe"; PG *daigaz > OE dāg, dāh > "dough"
ai, oi, h₂ei, h₃ei	ai		ā	ǣ	(+w) /ɔu/	/ɛu/	GA /oʊ/, RP /əʊ/	/(j)uː/	PG *maiwiz > OE mǣw > "mew"
au, ou, h₂eu, h₃eu	au		ēa	ē	/ɛː/	/eː/	/iː/; /eɪ/; /ɛ/	/iː/	PG *auzǭ > OE ēare > "ear"; PG *hauzijaną > OE hēran (WS hīeran) > "to hear"
au, ou, h₂eu, h₃eu	au		ēa	ē	(+w) /ɛu/	/eu/ > /iu/	/(j)uː/	/(j)uː/	PG *skrawwǫ̂ > OE sċrēawa > ME "shrewe" > "shrew"
au, ou, h₂eu, h₃eu	au	+c,g,h; rc,rg,rh;lc,lg,lh	ē	ē	/eː/	/eː/	/iː/	/iː/	PG *auke(?), *aukijaną > OE ēc, ēċan (WS ēac, īeċan) "also, to increase" > ME "eke, eche" > "eke" (archaic), "to eke"
au, ou, h₂eu, h₃eu	au	+c,g,h; rc,rg,rh;lc,lg,lh	ē	ē	(+g,h) /iː/	/iː/	/aɪ/	/aɪ/	PG *augǭ > OE ēġe (WS ēage) > "eye"; PG *hauhaz, hauhistaz > OE hēh (WS hēah) > "high", superl. hēhst (WS hīehst) "highest"
(h₁)eu	eu		ēo	N/A	/eː/	N/A	/iː/	N/A	PG *deupaz > OE dēop > "deep"; PG *beudaną > OE bēodan "to command"
(h₁)eu	eu		ēo	N/A	(+w) /eu/ > /iu/	N/A	/(j)uː/	N/A	PG *hrewwaną > OE hrēowan > "to rue"
(h₁)eu	eu	+c,g,h; rc,rg,rh; lc,lg,lh	ē	N/A	/eː/	N/A	/iː/	N/A	PG *reukaną > OE rēcan (WS rēocan) > "to reek"
(h₁)eu	eu	+c,g,h; rc,rg,rh; lc,lg,lh	ē	N/A	(+g,h) /iː/	N/A	/aɪ/	N/A	PG *fleugǭ > OE flēge (WS flēoge) > "fly"; PG *leuganą > OE lēgan (WS lēogan) > "to lie"; PIE *leuktos > PG *leuhtaz > OE lēht (WS lēoht) > "light" (brightness)
(h₁)eu+C^{*}i, (h₁)eu+C^{*}y	iu		N/A	īo > ēo	N/A	/eː/	N/A	/iː/	PIE *newios > PG *niujaz > OE nīwe > "new"; PG *biudiþi > 3rd sing. pres. indic. bīott (WS bīett) "commands"
(h₁)eu+C^{*}i, (h₁)eu+C^{*}y	iu		N/A	īo > ēo	(+w) N/A	/eu/ > /iu/	N/A	/(j)uː/	PG *triwwiz > *triwwijaz > OE trīowe, trēowe > ME "trewe" > "true"
(h₁)eu+C^{*}i, (h₁)eu+C^{*}y	iu	+c,g,h; rc,rg,rh; lc,lg,lh	N/A	ī	N/A	/iː/	/aɪ/	/aɪ/	PIE *leuktionom > PG *liuhtijaną > OE līhtan (WS līehtan) "to light"

^{1}A + separates the sounds that produced the Proto-Germanic vowels in question from the sounds that formed the conditioning environment. The notation C^{*} means a sequence of zero or more consonants.

^{2}I-umlaut refers to a sound change that took place around 500 AD with pervasive effects on English vowels. Specifically, vowels were fronted or raised whenever an /i/ or /j/ followed in the next syllable. Nearly every vowel was affected. Affected vocabulary is shown in a different color.

^{3} PIE *n̥ and *n̥H became Proto-Germanic un; similarly for *m̥, *l̥ and *r̥. K refers to either of the PIE sounds ḱ or k, which fell together in Proto-Germanic and the other centum languages; or to any of the nine PIE velars when followed directly by a voiceless consonant (especially t). H refers to any laryngeal sound. The ogonek (e.g. ą, ǭ) indicates a nasal vowel. Long vowels are noted with a macron (e.g. ē, ō). Extralong vowels are noted with a circumflex (e.g. ô).

^{4} The origins of Proto-Germanic ē are somewhat in dispute.

== See also ==
- English language
- History of English
- English phonology
- Phonological history of English consonants
  - Phonological history of English consonant clusters
- Phonological history of English vowels
  - Phonological history of English short A
  - Phonological history of English low back vowels
  - Phonological history of English high back vowels
  - Phonological history of English high front vowels
  - English-language vowel changes before historical /r/
  - English-language vowel changes before historical /l/
- Scottish vowel length rule
- Phonological history of Scots
