= Trisyllabic laxing =

Historic vowel shift

Trisyllabic laxing, or trisyllabic shortening, is any of three processes in English in which tense vowels (long vowels or diphthongs) become lax (short monophthongs) if they are followed by two or more syllables, at least the first of which is unstressed, for example, grateful vs gratitude, pronounce vs pronunciation.

By a different process, laxing is also found in disyllabic and monosyllabic words, for example, shade vs shadow, lose vs lost.

== Trisyllabic laxing ==
Trisyllabic laxing is a process which has occurred at various periods in the history of English:

1. The earliest occurrence of trisyllabic laxing occurred in late Old English and caused stressed long vowels to become shortened before clusters of two consonants when two or more syllables followed.
2. Later in Middle English, the process was expanded to all vowels when two or more syllables followed.
3. The Middle English sound change remained in the language and is still a mostly-productive process in Modern English, detailed in Chomsky and Halle's The Sound Pattern of English.

The Middle English sound change occurred before the Great Vowel Shift and other changes to the nature of vowels. As a result of the changes, the pairs of vowels related by trisyllabic laxing often bear little resemblance to one another in Modern English; however, originally they always bore a consistent relationship. For example, tense /aʊ/ was [uː], and lax /ʌ/ was [u] at the time of trisyllabic laxing.

In some cases, trisyllabic laxing appears to take place when it should not have done so: for example, in "south" /ˈsaʊθ/ vs. "southern" /ˈsʌðərn/. In such cases, the apparent anomaly is caused by later sound changes: "southern" (formerly southerne) was pronounced /suːðernə/ when trisyllabic laxing applied.

In the modern English language, there are systematic exceptions to the process, such as in words ending in -ness: "mindfulness, loneliness". There are also occasional, non-systematic exceptions such as "obese, obesity" (/oʊˈbiːsɪti/, not */oʊˈbɛsɪti/), although in this case the former was back-formed from the latter in the 19th century.

Tense vowel	→	Lax vowel	Change in Middle English	Example	IPA
iː	→	ɛ	eː → e ɛː → e	serene, serenity; impede, impediment	/sᵻˈriːn, sᵻˈrɛnᵻti/; /ɪmˈpiːd, ɪmˈpɛdᵻmənt/
eɪ	→	æ	aː → a	profane, profanity; grateful, gratitude	/prəˈfeɪn, prəˈfænᵻti/; /ˈɡreɪtfəl, ˈɡrætᵻtjuːd/
aɪ	→	ɪ	iː → i	divine, divinity; derive, derivative	/dᵻˈvaɪn, dᵻˈvɪnᵻti/; /dᵻˈraɪv, dᵻˈrɪvətᵻv/
aʊ	→	ʌ	uː → u	profound, profundity; pronounce, pronunciation	/prəˈfaʊnd, prəˈfʌndᵻti/; /prəˈnaʊns, prəˌnʌnsiˈeɪʃən/
uː	→	ɒ	oː → o	(No longer part of the active vowel system of English)	
oʊ	→	ɒ	ɔː → o	provoke, provocative; sole, solitude	/prəˈvoʊk, prəˈvɒk.ə.tɪv/; /ˈsoʊl, ˈsɒlᵻtjuːd/

== Disyllabic laxing ==
Several now-defunct Middle English phonological processes have created an irregular system of disyllabic laxing; unlike trisyllabic laxing which was one phonological change, apparent disyllabic laxing in Modern English is caused by many different sound changes:

- please → pleasant /ˈpliːz, ˈplɛzənt/
- shade → shadow /ˈʃeɪd, ˈʃædoʊ/

pale → pallid /ˈpeɪl, ˈpælɪd/

- child → children /ˈtʃaɪld, ˈtʃɪldrən/

dine → dinner /ˈdaɪn, ˈdɪnər/
divide → division /dɪˈvaɪd, dɪˈvɪʒən/

- south → southern /ˈsaʊθ, ˈsʌðərn/

out → utter /ˈaʊt, ˈʌtər/

- goose → gosling /ˈɡuːs, ˈɡɒzlɪŋ/

fool → folly /ˈfuːl, ˈfɒli/
food → fodder /ˈfuːd, ˈfɒdər/

- cone → conic /ˈkoʊn, ˈkɒnɪk/ (and other words in -ic)

depose → deposit /dᵻˈpoʊz, dᵻˈpɒzɪt/

Many cases of disyllabic laxing are due, as in southern and shadow above, to Middle English having had more unstressed /ə/ sounds than Modern English: sutherne /suðərnə/, schadowe /ʃadəwə/, /ʃadou̯ə/. Cases such as please, pleasant and dine, dinner come from how French words were adapted into Middle English: a stressed French vowel was borrowed into English as an equivalent long vowel. However, if the stressed English vowel was originally an unstressed vowel in French, the vowel was not lengthened; examples of this which did not create an alteration are Old French pitee /piˈte/ → Middle English pite /ˈpiteː/ and Old French plais- /plɛz-/ (stem of plaire) → Middle English plesen /ˈplɛːzən/, plaisant /plɛˈzãnt/ → plesaunt /ˈplɛzau̯nt/, /ˈplɛzənt/.

Some Latinate words, such as Saturn, have short vowels where from syllable structure one would expect a long vowel. Other cases differentiate British and American English, with more frequent disyllabic laxing in American English – compare RP and GA pronunciations of era, lever, patent, primer (book) and progress (noun), though there are exceptions such as leisure, produce (noun), Tethys, yogurt and zebra that have a short vowel in RP. On the other hand, American English is less likely to have trisyllabic laxing, for example in words such as dynasty, patronize, privacy and vitamin. Much of this irregularity is due to morphological leveling.

== Monosyllabic laxing ==
Laxing also occurs in basic monosyllabic vocabulary, which presumably helps keep it active across generations. For example, the /iː/ → /ɛ/ shift occurs in the past-tense forms of basic verbs such as feel, keep, kneel, mean, sleep, sweep, weep and – without a suffix -t – in feed, lead, read. Other shifts occur in bite → bit, do → done, go → gone, hide → hid, lose → lost, shoot → shot, etc.

== Sources ==
- Blake, Norman, ed. (1992). The Cambridge history of the English language. Vol. 2. Cambridge: Cambridge University Press. pp. 71–73. ISBN 9780521264754.
- Chomsky, Noam; Halle, Morris (1968). The sound pattern of English. New York: Harper & Row.
- Cummings, D. W. (1988). American English Spelling: An Informal Description. Baltimore, MD: The Johns Hopkins University Press. pp. 131–141. ISBN 9780801834431.
- Lahiri, Aditi; Fikkert, Paula (1999). "Trisyllabic shortening in English: past and present" (PDF). English Language and Linguistics. 3 (2): 229–267. doi:10.1017/S1360674399000234. S2CID 123063739.
- Myers, Scott (1987). "Vowel Shortening in English". Natural Language & Linguistic Theory, Vol. 5, No. 4 (Dec., 1987), pp. 485–518.
- Wells, John C. (1982). Accents of English. Vol. 1: An introduction. Cambridge: Cambridge University Press. pp. 187–188. ISBN 9780521297196.
