= Pronunciation of English ⟨a⟩ =

There are a variety of pronunciations in Modern English and in historical forms of the language for words spelled with the letter ⟨a⟩. Most of these go back to the low vowel (the "short A") of earlier Middle English, which later developed both long and short forms. The sound of the long vowel was altered in the Great Vowel Shift, but later a new long A (or "broad A") developed which was not subject to the shift. These processes have produced the main four pronunciations of ⟨a⟩ in present-day English: those found in the words trap, face, father and square (with the phonetic output depending on whether the dialect is rhotic or not, and, in rhotic dialects, whether or not the Mary–merry merger occurs). Separate developments have produced additional pronunciations in words like wash, talk and comma.

== Overview ==
Late Middle English had two phonemes /a/ and /aː/, differing only in length. The /a/ ("short A") was found in words such as cat [kat] and trap [trap], and also before /r/ in words such as start [start]. The /aː/ ("long A") was found in words such as face [faːs], and before /r/ in words such as scare [skaːr]. This long A was generally a result of Middle English open syllable lengthening. For a summary of the various developments in Old and Middle English that led to these vowels, see English historical vowel correspondences.

As a result of the Great Vowel Shift, the long [aː] of face was raised, initially to [æː] and later to [ɛː]. After 1700 it was raised even further, and then diphthongized, leading to the modern standard pronunciation /eɪ/. Additionally, the short [a] of trap was fronted to [æ]; this change became accepted in standard speech during the 17th century. Today there is much regional variation in the realization of this vowel; in RP there has been a recent trend for it to be lowered again to a fully open [a].

These trends, allowed to operate unrestrictedly, would have left standard English without any vowels in the [a] or [aː] area by the late 17th century. However, this putative gap was filled by the following special developments:

- In two environments, Middle English [a] developed to [aː] rather than [æ]
  - Before non-prevocalic /r/ (e.g. in start, star; but not in carry), [a] developed to [aː] in all words
  - Before some fricatives, broadening happened inconsistently and sporadically
- Words that had Middle English [au] had a regular development to [ɒː] (for example, paw). However, before a nasal, such words sometimes instead developed to [aː] (e.g. palm).

The [aː] of the late 17th century has generally backed to [ɑː] in several varieties of contemporary English, for example in Received Pronunciation.

The following table shows some developments of Middle English /a/ in Received Pronunciation. The word gate, which derived from Middle English /aː/, has also been included for comparison.

| | | gate | cast | cart | cat | glad |
|---|---|---|---|---|---|---|
| Middle English | | [ɡaːt] | [kast] | [kart] | [kat] | [ɡlad] |
| Great Vowel Shift | Phase 1 | [ɡæːt] | [kast] | [kart] | [kat] | [ɡlad] |
| Great Vowel Shift | Phase 2 | [ɡɛːt] | [kast] | [kart] | [kat] | [ɡlad] |
| Great Vowel Shift | Phase 3 | [ɡeːt] | [kast] | [kart] | [kat] | [ɡlad] |
| Great Vowel Shift | Phase 4 | [ɡeɪt] | [kast] | [kart] | [kat] | [ɡlad] |
| Lengthening before /r/ | | [ɡeɪt] | [kast] | [kaːrt] | [kat] | [ɡlad] |
| Lengthening before /f,θ,s/ | | [ɡeɪt] | [kaːst] | [kaːrt] | [kat] | [ɡlad] |
| Fronting of /a/ | | [ɡeɪt] | [kaːst] | [kaːrt] | [kæt] | [ɡlæd] |
| Backing of /aː/ | | [ɡeɪt] | [kɑːst] | [kɑːrt] | [kæt] | [ɡlæd] |
| /r/-dropping | | [ɡeɪt] | [kɑːst] | [kɑːt] | [kæt] | [ɡlæd] |
| bad–lad split | | [ɡeɪt] | [kɑːst] | [kɑːt] | [kæt] | [ɡlæːd] |
| Lowering of /æ/ | | [ɡeɪt] | [kɑːst] | [kɑːt] | [kat] | [ɡla(ː)d] |

The table below shows the results of these developments in some contemporary varieties of English:

| | | RP | NE | SCO | IRL | GA | AusE | NZE |
|---|---|---|---|---|---|---|---|---|
| Lengthening before /r/ | | ✔ | ✔ | | variable | ✔ | ✔ | ✔ |
| Lengthening before /f,θ,s/ | | ✔ | | | variable | | variable | ✔ |
| Fronting of /a/ | | ✔ | | | ✔ | ✔ | ✔ | ✔ |
| Backing of /aː/ | | ✔ | | | | ✔ | partly | partly |
| R-dropping | | ✔ | ✔ | | | | ✔ | ✔ |
| bad–lad split | | ✔ | | | | ✔ | ✔ | |
| /æ/ tensing | | | | | | ✔ | | |
| Lowering of /æ/ | | ✔ | | | variable | | ✔ | |
| Output for | gate | [ɡɛɪt] | [ɡeːt] | [ɡet] | [ɡeːθ̠] | [ɡeɪt] | [ɡæɪt] | [ɡæɪt] |
| Output for | cast | [kɑːst] | [kast] | [kast] | [kæs(ː)t~ka(ː)st] | [kæst]* | [kast]~[kɐːst] | [kɐːst] |
| Output for | cart | [kɑːt] | [kaːt] | [kaɹt] | [kæ(ː)ɻθ̠~kä(ː)ɻθ̠] | [kɑːɹt] | [kɐːt] | [kɐːt] |
| Output for | cat | [kat] | [kat] | [kat] | [kæθ̠~kaθ̠] | [kæt] | [kat] | [kɛt] |
| Output for | glad | [ɡla(ː)d] | [ɡlad] | [ɡlad] | [ɡlæd~ɡlad] | [ɡlæd] | [ɡlaːd] | [ɡlɛd] |
| Output for | gas | [ɡas] | [ɡas] | [ɡas] | [ɡæs~ɡas] | [ɡæs]* | [ɡas] | [ɡɛs] |

* May undergo /æ/-tensing.

== Old and Middle English ==
Old English (OE) had an open back vowel /ɑ/, written ⟨a⟩, as well as a front vowel /æ/, written ⟨æ⟩. These had corresponding long vowels /ɑː/ and /æː/ but were not normally distinguished from the short vowels in spelling although modern editions of Old English texts often mark them as ⟨ā⟩ and ⟨ǣ⟩. In the low vowel area, there was also a pair of short and long diphthongs, /æɑ/ and /æːɑ/, written ⟨ea⟩ (the long one also ⟨ēa⟩ in modern editions).

In Middle English (ME), the short /ɑ/, /æ/ and /æɑ/ became merged into a single vowel /a/, written ⟨a⟩. In some cases (before certain pairs of consonants) the corresponding long vowels also developed into this short /a/. Mostly, however, OE /æː/ and /æːɑ/ were raised to become Middle English /ɛː/ (the sound that often gives ⟨ea⟩ in modern spelling), and OE /ɑː/ was raised and rounded to become ME /ɔː/ (often ⟨o⟩, ⟨oa⟩ in modern spelling). For more details, see English historical vowel correspondences.

During the Middle English period, like other short vowels, the /a/ was lengthened in open syllables. Later, with the gradual loss of unstressed endings, many such syllables ceased to be open, but the vowel remained long.

For example, the word name originally had two syllables, the first being open, so the /a/ was lengthened; later, the final vowel was dropped, leaving a closed syllable with a long vowel. As a result, there were now two phonemes /a/ and /aː/, both written ⟨a⟩, the long one being often indicated by a silent ⟨e⟩ after the following consonant (or, in some cases, by a pronounced vowel after the following consonant, as in naked and bacon).

== Further development of Middle English /aː/ ==
As a result of the Great Vowel Shift, the long /aː/ that resulted from Middle English open syllable lengthening was raised, initially to [æː] and later to [ɛː]. [æː] "seems to have been the normal pronunciation in careful speech before 1650, and [ɛː] after 1650". After 1700 it was raised even further, and then diphthongized, leading to the modern standard pronunciation /eɪ/, found in words like name, face, bacon. However, some accents, in the north of England and in Scotland, for example, retain a monophthongal pronunciation of this vowel, while other accents have a variety of different diphthongs.

Before (historical) /r/, in words like square, the vowel has become [ɛə] (often practically [ɛː]) in Standard Southern British, and [ɛ] in General American.

== Changes in realization of /a/ ==
Independently of the development of the long vowel, the short /a/ came to be fronted and raised to [æ]. This change was mostly confined to "vulgar or popular" speech in the 16th century, but it gradually replaced the more conservative [a] in the 17th century, and was "generally accepted by careful speakers by about 1670".

This vowel (that of trap, cat, man, bad, etc.) is now normally denoted as /æ/. In present-day RP, however, it has lowered to a fully front [a]. Such a quality is also found in the accents of northern England, Wales, Scotland, Ireland, Canada, California and the Caribbean. Raised pronunciations are also found in Southern Hemisphere English, and are also associated with Cockney. For the possibility of phonemic length differentiation, see bad–lad split, below.

== Development of the new long A ==
In Modern English, a new phoneme /ɑː/ developed that did not exist in Middle English. The phoneme /ɑː/ comes from three sources: the word father lengthening from /a/ to /aː/ for an unknown reason (thus splitting from gather); the compensatory lengthening of the short /a/ in words like calm, palm, psalm when /l/ was lost in this environment; and the lengthening of /a/ before /r/ in words like car, card, hard, part, etc. In most dialects that developed the broad A class, words containing it joined this new phoneme /ɑː/ as well. The new phoneme also became common in onomatopoeic words like baa, ah, ha ha, as well as in foreign borrowed words like spa, taco, llama, drama, piranha, Bahamas, pasta, Bach, many of which vary between /ɑː/ and /æ/ among different dialects of English.

Some of these developments are discussed in detail in the following sections.

=== Before /r/ ===
In late Middle English, pairs such as cat, cart, were pronounced [kat], [kart] respectively, distinguished only by the presence or absence of [r]. However, by the late 17th century they were also distinguished by the quality and length of the vowel. In cat, the vowel had been fronted to /kæt/, while in cart it had been lengthened to /kaːrt/. This latter change seems to have first occurred in the dialects of southern England in the early 15th century, but did not affect Standard English until the later 17th century. It has affected most varieties of contemporary English, which have distinct vowels in pairs such as cat, cart. In non-rhotic accents, the /r/ of cart has been lost; in Standard Southern British the word is pronounced /kɑːt/, distinguished from cat only by the quality and length of the vowel.

This lengthening occurred when /a/ was followed by non-pre-vocalic /r/; it did not generally apply before intervocalic /r/ (when the /r/ was followed by another vowel). Hence the first vowel of carrot and marry has normally remained the same as that of cat (but see the mary–marry–merry merger). However, inflected forms and derivatives of words ending in (historical) /r/ generally inherit the lengthened vowel, so words like barring and starry have /ɑː/ as do bar and star.

=== Before fricatives ===
Unlike lengthening before nonprevocalic /r/, which applied universally in Standard English, lengthening, or broadening, before fricatives was inconsistent and sporadic. This seems to have first occurred in the dialects of Southern England between about 1500 and 1650. It penetrated into Standard English from these dialects around the mid-17th century.

The primary environment which favored broadening was before preconsonantal or morpheme-final voiceless fricatives /f, θ, s/. The voiceless fricative /ʃ/ has never promoted broadening in Standard English in words like ash and crash. There is, however, evidence that such broadening did occur in dialects.

Once broadening affected a particular word, it tended to spread by analogy to its inflectional derivatives. For example, from pass ([paːs]) there was also passing [ˈpaːsɪŋ]. This introduced broadening into the environment _sV, from which it was otherwise excluded (compare passage which is not an inflectional form, and was never affected by broadening).

In a phenomenon going back to Middle English, [f, θ] alternate with their voiced equivalents [v, ð]. For example, late Middle English path [paθ] alternated with paths [paðz]. When broadening applied to words such as path, it naturally extended to these derivatives: thus when [paθ] broadened to [paːθ], [paðz] also broadened to [paːðz]. This introduced broadening into the environment before a voiced fricative.

Broadening affected Standard English extremely inconsistently. It seems to have been favored when /a/ was adjacent to labial consonants or /r/. It is apparent that it occurred most commonly in short words, especially monosyllables, that were common and well-established in English at the time broadening took place (c. 1500–1650). Words of 3 or more syllables were hardly ever subject to broadening. Learned words, neologisms (such as gas, first found in the late 17th century), and Latinate or Greek borrowings were rarely broadened.

A particularly interesting case is that of the word father. In late Middle English this was generally pronounced [ˈfaðər], thus rhyming with gather [ˈɡaðər]. Broadening of father is notable both in two respects:

- its occurrence before an intervocalic voiced fricative [ð]
- its distribution in many accents that do not otherwise have broadening, such as those of North America.

The Oxford English Dictionary describes the broadening of father as "anomalous". Dobson, however, sees broadening in father as due to the influence of the adjacent /f/ and /r/ combined. Rather and lather appear to have been subject to broadening later, and in fewer varieties of English, by analogy with father.

The table below represents the results of broadening before fricatives in Standard Southern British.

| Environment | RP /æ/ as in TRAP ("flat A") | RP /ɑː/ as in PALM or FAther ("broad A") |
|---|---|---|
| _[f]$ | carafe*, chiffchaff, gaffe, naff, riffraff | calf**, chaff*, giraffe, graph (telegraph, see above), half**, laugh**, staff |
| _[f]C | Daphne, hermaphrodite, kaftan, naphtha | aft, after, craft, daft, draft/draught**, graft, laughter**, raft, rafter, shaft |
| _[θ]$ | hath, math (abbrev. for mathematics) | bath, lath*, path |
| _[θ]C | athlete, decathlon (pentathlon, biathlon, etc.), maths | |
| _[s]$ | alas*, ass (donkey), ass (term of abuse)*, crass, gas, lass, mass (amount), Mass (religious service)* | brass, class, glass, grass, pass |
| _[sp] | asp, aspect, aspen, aspic (jelly), aspirant, aspirin, Diaspora, exasperate*, jasper | clasp, gasp, grasp, hasp*, rasp |
| _[st] | aster, asteroid, astronaut (astronomical, etc.), bastion, blastocyst (blastopore, etc.), canasta, castanets, chastity, elastic*, fantastic, gastric, gymnastic, hast, Jocasta, mastic, masticate, mastiff*, mastitis, mastoid, mastodon, masturbate*, monastic, onomastic, pasta, pastel, plastic*, procrastinate, Rastafarian, raster, sarcastic, scholastic, spastic | aghast, avast, bastard*, blast, cast, caster, fast, ghastly, last, mast, master, nasty, past, pasteurize*, pastime, pastor, pastoral*, pasture, plaster, repast, vast |
| _[sk] | Alaska, Basque*, emasculate, gasket, Madagascar, mascot, masculine, masquerade*, Nebraska, paschal*, vascular | ask, bask, basket, cask, casket, flask, mask, masque*, rascal, task |
| _[sf] | blasphemy* | |
| _[ð] | blather, fathom, gather, slather | father, lather*, rather |
| other (see below) | | calve**, castle, fasten, halve**, raspberry |

- * indicates that the other pronunciation is also current in RP.
- ** indicates that this word had late Middle English /au/ (possibly in addition to late Middle English /a/)
- Words in italics were first recorded by the Oxford English Dictionary later than 1650

In general, all these words, to the extent that they existed in Middle English, had /a/ ("short A" as in trap) which was broadened to [aː]. The exceptions are:

- half and calf, which had been pronounced with [half, kalf] in early Middle English before developing around the early 15th century to [hauf, kauf] by L-vocalization. In accents of England the development was subsequently the same as that in words such as palm (see below). The North American development to [æ] as in trap seems to be the result of shortening from [hauf, kauf] to [haf, kaf], although there is little evidence of this development.
- laugh, laughter and draft/draught, which all had [auχ] in Middle English. This first changed to [auf] (accepted in Standard English from about 1625, but earlier in dialects), and was then shortened to [af]. The subsequent development was similar to other words with [af], such as staff. The development of draft/draught is notable: in the 17th century it was usually spelled draught and pronounced to rhyme with caught, making clear its derivation from the verb to draw. The pronunciation with [f] was rare, and its use in current English is a historical accident resulting, according to Dobson, from the establishment of the spelling variant draft.

The words castle, fasten and raspberry are special cases where subsequent sound changes have altered the conditions initially responsible for lengthening. In castle and fasten, the /t/ was pronounced, according to a slight majority of 16th and 17th century sources. In raspberry we find /s/ rather than /z/.

The pattern of lengthening shown here for Received Pronunciation is generally found in southern England, the Caribbean, and the Southern hemisphere (parts of Australia, New Zealand and South Africa). In North America, with the possible exception of older Boston accents, broadening is found only in father (the success of broadening in this word alone in North America unexplained) and pasta (which follows the general pattern for recent Italian loanwords, cf. mafia). In the Boston area there has historically been a tendency to copy RP lengthening which perhaps reached its zenith in the 1930s but has since receded in the face of general North American norms.

In Irish English broadening is found only in father (which may, however, also have the FACE vowel). In Scottish and Ulster English the great majority of speakers have no distinction between TRAP and PALM (the Sam–psalm merger). In Welsh English Wells finds broadening generally only in father, with some variation. In the north of England, broadening is usually found only in father and half, and in some regions master.

=== Before nasals ===
There was a class of Middle English words in which /au/ varied with /a/ before a nasal. These are nearly all loanwords from French, in which uncertainty about how to realize the nasalization of the French vowel resulted in two varying pronunciations in English. (One might compare the different ways in which modern French loanwords like envelope are pronounced in contemporary varieties of English.)

Words with Middle English with the /au/ diphthong generally developed to [ɒː] in Early Modern English (e.g. paw, daughter). However, in some of the words with the /a ~ au/ alternation, especially short words in common use, the vowel instead developed into a long A. In words like change and angel, this development preceded the Great Vowel Shift, and so the resulting long A followed the normal development to modern /eɪ/. In other cases, however, the long A appeared later, and thus did not undergo the Great Vowel Shift, but instead merged with the long A that had developed before /r/ and some fricatives (as described above). Thus words like dance and example have come to be pronounced (in Standard Southern British, although mostly not in General American) with the /ɑː/ vowel of start and bath.

Words in this category may therefore have ended up with a variety of pronunciations in modern standard English: /æ/ (where the short A pronunciation survived), /ɑː/ (where the pronunciation with lengthened A was adopted), /ɔː/ (where the normal development of the AU diphthong was followed), and /eɪ/ (where the A was lengthened before the Great Vowel Shift). The table below shows the pronunciation of many of these words, classified according to the lexical sets of John Wells: TRAP for /æ/, BATH for RP /ɑː/ vs. General American /æ/, PALM for /ɑː/, THOUGHT for /ɔː/, FACE for /eɪ/. Although these words were often spelled with both ⟨a⟩ and ⟨au⟩ in Middle English, the current English spelling generally reflects the pronunciation, with ⟨au⟩ used only for those words which have /ɔː/; one common exception is aunt.

| Environment | TRAP lexical set | BATH lexical set | PALM lexical set | THOUGHT lexical set | FACE lexical set |
|---|---|---|---|---|---|
| _[m]$ | | | alms, balm, calm, palm, psalm, qualm | shawm | |
| _[mp] | champion, rampant, stamp* | example, sample | | | |
| _[mb] | amber | | | | chamber |
| _[mf] | pamphlet | | | | |
| _[nt] | ant*, lantern, phantom, rant, scant | advantage, aunt, can't*, chant, grant, plant, slant, vantage | | daunt, flaunt*, gaunt*, gauntlet, haunt, jaunt*, saunter, taunt, vaunt | |
| _[nd] | abandon, grand, random | command, demand, Flanders, remand, reprimand, slander | | jaundice, laundry, Maundy | |
| _[n(t)ʃ] | franchise | avalanche, blanch, branch, ranch*, stanch, stanchion | | haunch, launch, paunch, staunch | |
| _[n(d)ʒ] | evangelist, phalange | | | | angel, arrange, change, danger, grange, mange, range, strange |
| _[ŋk] | bank ("bench/financial institution"), canker, flank, plank, ranco(u)r, sanctity | | | | |
| _[ŋɡ] | anger*, angle, strangle | | | | |
| _[ns] | ancestor, finance, ransom, romance | answer*, chance, chancellor, dance, enhance, France, lance, lancet, prance, stance, trance, transfer (trans-) | | launce | ancient |
| Other | salmon | almond | | | |

* Not a French loanword

In some cases, both the /a/ and the /au/ forms have survived into Modern English. For example, from Sandre, a Norman French form of the name Alexander, the Modern English surnames Sanders and Saunders are both derived.

== TRAP–BATH split ==
TRAP–BATH split
An example of the TRAP–BATH split

The TRAP–BATH split is a vowel split that occurs mainly in the southern and mainstream varieties of English in England (including Received Pronunciation), in the Southern Hemisphere accents of English (Australian English, New Zealand English, South African English), and also to a lesser extent in older Boston English, by which the Early Modern English phoneme /æ/ was lengthened in certain environments and ultimately merged with the long /ɑː/ of father. Similar changes took place in words with ⟨o⟩; see lot–cloth split.

Minimal pairs created by the split
| /æ/ | /ɑː/ | Notes |
|---|---|---|
| aff | half | With h-dropping. |
| ant | aunt | |
| asp | hasp | With h-dropping. |
| baff | bath | With th-fronting. |
| bat | bath | With th-stopping. |
| caf | calf | |
| cant | can't | |
| hath | half | With th-fronting. |
| have | halve | |
| lat | lath | With th-stopping and lat meaning 'latitude'. |
| pat | path | With th-stopping. |

== TRAP–STRUT merger ==
The TRAP–STRUT merger is a merger of /æ/ and /ʌ/ occasionally occurring in Received Pronunciation. It is the outcome of lowering the TRAP vowel to [a] for those speakers who have a fronted STRUT vowel. The merger is likely not categorical, which means that the phonemes remain distinct in their underlying form. In Standard Southern British (SSB), [a] is the norm for TRAP, whereas STRUT is usually backer and somewhat higher than TRAP, [ɐ] or even [ʌ]. In the early days of TRAP-lowering, the fully open pronunciation of TRAP was typically heard as a merger regardless of the exact phonetic realization of STRUT.

In Cockney, /æ/ and /ʌ/ can come close as [æ] and [ɐ̟]. Thus, Cockney may be an example of a language variety that contrasts near-front and fully front vowels of the same height, roundedness and length, though the former tends to undergo lengthening before /d/ (see bad–lad split).

In General Australian English, the vowels are distinguished as [a] and [ä] before non-nasal consonants.

A three-way merger of /æ/, /ʌ/ and /ɑː/ is a common pronunciation error among L2 speakers of English whose native language is Italian, Spanish or Catalan.

Homophonous pairs
| /æ/ | /ʌ/ | IPA | Notes |
|---|---|---|---|
| back | buck | ˈbak | |
| bad | bud | ˈbad | |
| ban | bun | ˈban | |
| bat | but | ˈbat | With the strong form of but. |
| bat | butt | ˈbat | |
| cal | cull | ˈkal | |
| cant | cunt | ˈkant | |
| cap | cup | ˈkap | |
| carry | curry | ˈkari | |
| cat | cut | ˈkat | |
| fan | fun | ˈfan | |
| gat | gut | ˈgat | |
| Harry | hurry | ˈhari | |
| hat | hut | ˈhat | |
| lack | luck | ˈlak | |
| mad | mud | ˈmad | |
| pat | putt | ˈpat | |
| sack | suck | ˈsak | |
| Sam | sum | ˈsam | |
| tack | tuck | ˈtak | |

== STRUT–PALM merger ==
The STRUT–PALM merger is a merger of /ʌ/ and /ɑː/ that occurs in Black South African English and commonly also in non-native speech.

== Bad–lad split ==
The bad–lad split has been described as a phonemic split of the Early Modern English short vowel phoneme /æ/ into a short /æ/ and a long /æː/. This split is found in Australian English and some varieties of English English in which bad (with long [æː]) and lad (with short [æ]) do not rhyme.

The phoneme /æ/ is usually lengthened to /æː/ when it comes before an /m/ or /n/, within the same syllable. It is furthermore lengthened in the adjectives bad, glad and mad; family also sometimes has a long vowel, regardless of whether it is pronounced as two or three syllables. Some speakers and regional varieties also use /æː/ before /ɡ/, /ŋ/, /l/ and/or /dʒ/; such lengthening may be more irregular than others. Lengthening is prohibited in the past tense of irregular verbs and function words and in modern contractions of polysyllabic words where the /æ/ was before a consonant followed by a vowel. Lengthening is not stopped by the addition of word-level suffixes.

British dialects with the bad–lad split have instead broad /ɑː/ in some words where an /m/ or /n/ follows the vowel. In this circumstance, Australian speakers usually (but not universally) use /æː/, except in the words aunt, can't and shan't, which have broad /aː/.

Daniel Jones noted for RP that some speakers had a phonemic contrast between a long and a short /æ/, which he wrote as /æː/ and /æ/, respectively. Thus, in An outline of English phonetics (1962, ninth edition, Cambridge: W. Heffer & Sons) he noted that sad, bad generally had /æː/ but lad, pad had /æ/. In his pronouncing dictionary, he recorded several minimal pairs, for example bad /bæːd/, bade /bæd/ (also pronounced /ˈbeɪd/). He noted that for some speakers, jam actually represented two different pronunciations, one pronounced /dʒæːm/ meaning 'fruit conserve', the other /dʒæm/ meaning 'crush, wedging'. Later editions of this dictionary, edited by Alfred C. Gimson, dropped this distinction.

Outside of England, can meaning 'able to' remains /kæn/, whereas the noun can 'container' or the verb can 'to put into a container' is /kæːn/; this is similar to the situation found in /æ/ raising in some varieties of American English. A common minimal pair for Standard Southern British speakers is band /bæːnd/ and banned /bænd/. Australian speakers who use 'span' as the past tense of 'spin' also have a minimal pair between longer /spæːn/ (meaning width or the transitive verb with a river or divide) and /spæn/, the past tense of 'spin' (/spæn/). Other minimal pairs found in Australian English include 'Manning' (the surname) /ˈmænɪŋ/ and 'manning' (the present participle and gerund of the verb 'to man') /ˈmæːnɪŋ/ as well as 'planet' /ˈplænət/ versus 'plan it' /ˈplæːnət/.

Apart from Jones's, dictionaries rarely show a difference between these varieties of /æ/.

Experimental recordings of RP-speaking Cambridge University undergraduates has indicated that after coarticulatory effects are taken into account, words such as bag, that, gab, Ann, ban, damp, mad, bad, and sad may have slightly longer /æː/ vowels than relatively shorter words such as lad, snag, pad, Pam, and plan. However, no evidence of consistent duration differentiation was found in the possible minimal pairs adder/adder, cad/CAD, can (noun)/can (verb), dam/damn, jam/jam, lam/lamb, manning/Manning, mass/mass, sad/SAD. This casts doubt on its status as a true phonemic split among RP-speakers, and has been described instead as diachronically stable, lexically specific sub-phonemic variation.

== /æ/ raising ==
In the sociolinguistics of English, /æ/ raising is a process that occurs in many accents of American English, and to some degree in Canadian English, by which /æ/, the "short a" vowel found in such words as ash, bath, man, lamp, pal, rag, sack, trap, etc., is tensed: pronounced as more raised, and lengthened and/or diphthongized in various environments. The realization of this "tense" (as opposed to "lax") /æ/ varies from [ɛː] to [ɛə] to [eə] to [ɪə], depending on the speaker's regional accent. The most commonly tensed variant of /æ/ throughout North American English is when it appears before nasal consonants (thus, for example, in fan as opposed to fat).

== In foreign borrowings ==
Many foreign borrowed words such as taco, llama, drama, piranha, Bahamas, pasta, Bach, pecan, pajamas etc. vary as to whether or not they have the PALM vowel or the TRAP vowel in various dialects in English. In Canada and Northern England, many speakers pronounce such words with the same vowel as TRAP, whereas in American, Australian and New Zealand English as well as RP, they usually have the same vowel as PALM (although taco and pasta have the TRAP vowel in RP). However the pronunciation of certain words can vary even in regions which either usually assign the TRAP vowel or usually assign the PALM vowel to such words; pajamas and pecan, for instance, vary among Americans as to whether or not they have /æ/ or /ɑː/.

== Other pronunciations ==
Other pronunciations of the letter ⟨a⟩ in English have come about through:

- Fronting of the TRAP vowel to a vowel close to [ɛ], as in conservative RP of the early 20th century (see Received Pronunciation § Historical variation). This never led to a merger with the DRESS vowel in RP, but a fronted pronunciation of the TRAP vowel is also found in Singapore English, (typically) along with a partial or full met-mat merger, as well as in non-native speech, such as in L1 speakers of German (see Standard German phonology § Loanwords from English).
- Rounding caused by a following dark L (which may no longer be pronounced), to produce (in RP) /ɔː/, e.g. in also, alter, ball, call, chalk, halt, talk, etc. See English-language vowel changes before historical /l/.
- Rounding following /w/, resulting in the same two vowels as above, as in wash, what, quantity, water, warm. This change is typically blocked before a velar consonant, as in wag, quack and twang, and is also absent in swam (the irregular past tense of swim). See Phonological history of English low back vowels (17th-century changes).
- Reduction to schwa in most unstressed syllables, as in about, along, Hilary, comma, solar, standard, breakfast. (Like other instances of schwa, this can combine with a following /l/, /m/ or /n/ to produce a syllabic consonant in certain environments, as in rival.) Another possible reduced pronunciation (depending on dialect) is /ɪ/ in cases where the reduction of FACE vowel might be expected, -ace, -age, -ate (only adjectives and nouns), as in the second syllables of palace, message and private, etc.
- Irregular developments in a few words, particularly any and many. In the case of any, the spelling represents the pronunciation in the Midland dialect of Middle English, while the modern pronunciation comes from that of the southern dialect (the alternative spelling eny is also found in texts up to around 1530; the spelling ony, representing a northern dialect pronunciation, is also found). The situation is similar with many (with the spellings meny and mony formerly occurring).

== See also ==
- List of Latin-script digraphs
- Phonological history of English
- Phonological history of English vowels
