= Middle English phonology =

Historical, reconstructed phonology

The phonology of Middle English is necessarily somewhat speculative since it is preserved only as a written language. Nevertheless, there is a very large text corpus of Middle English. The dialects of Middle English vary greatly over both time and place, and in contrast with Old English and Modern English, spelling was usually phonetic rather than conventional. Words were generally spelled according to how they sounded to the person writing a text, rather than according to a formalised system that might not accurately represent the way the writer's dialect was pronounced, as Modern English is today.

The Middle English speech of the city of London in the late 14th century (essentially, the speech of Geoffrey Chaucer) is used as the standard Middle English dialect in teaching and when specifying "the" grammar or phonology of Middle English. It is this form that is described below, unless otherwise indicated.

In the rest of the article, abbreviations are used as follows:

- PIE = Proto-Indo-European
- OE = Old English
- PreOE = Pre-Old English
- ME = Middle English
- EME = Early Middle English
- LME = Late Middle English
- LLME = very late Middle English (post-Chaucer)
- NE = Modern English
- ENE = Early Modern English

== Sound inventory ==
The surface sounds of Chaucer's Middle English (whether allophones or phonemes) are shown in the tables below. Phonemes in bold were added across Middle English; those in italics were removed during the period.

=== Consonants ===
Middle English consonants
	Labial	Dental	Alveolar	Postalveolar	Palatal	Velar	Glottal
Nasal	m		n̥ • n			(**ŋ**)	
Stop	p • b		t • d	tʃ • dʒ		k • **g**	
Fricative	f • **v**	θ • **ð**	s • **z**	ʃ	(ç)	(x) • ɣ	h
Approximant			r̥ • r • rˠ		j	ʍ • w	
Lateral			ɬ • l • lˠ				

1. ^r The exact nature of Middle English r is unknown. This article uses ⟨r⟩ indiscriminately.

==== Consonant allophones ====
The sounds marked in parentheses in the table above are allophones:

- [ŋ] is an allophone of /n/ occurring before /k/ and /ɡ/
  - For example, ring ('ring') is [riŋɡ]; [ŋ] did not occur alone in Middle English, unlike in Modern English.
- [ç, x] are allophones of /h/ in syllable-final position after front and back vowels, respectively.
- Based on evidence from Old English and Modern English, /l/ and /r/ apparently had velarised counterparts or allophones [lˠ] and [rˠ]. These occurred after back vowels or the consonant /w/.

==== Voiced fricatives ====
In Old English, [v], [ð], [z] were allophones of /f/, /θ/, /s/, respectively, occurring between vowels or voiced consonants. That led to many alternations: hūs ('house') [huːs] vs. hūses ('of a house') [ˈhuːzes]; wīf ('woman') [wiːf] vs. wīfes ('of a woman') [ˈwiːves]. In Middle English, voiced allophones become phonemes and have become solidly established in Modern English as separate phonemes by several sources:

1. Borrowings from foreign languages, especially Latin, Ancient Greek and Old French, which introduced sounds where they had not occurred: modern fine vs. vine (both borrowings from French); ether (from Greek) vs. either (native).
2. Dialect mixture between Old English dialects (like Kentish) that voiced initial fricatives and the more standard dialects that did not. Compare fat vs. vat (both with f- in standard Old English) and fox vs. vixen (Old English fox vs. fyxen, from Proto-Germanic *fuhsa- vs. *fuhsin-).
3. Analogical changes that levelled former alternations: grass, grasses, grassy and glass, glasses, glassy with /s/ replacing the original /z/ between vowels (but to graze and to glaze, still with /z/, originally derived from grass and glass, respectively). Contrast wife vs. wives; greasy, still with a /z/ in some dialects (such as Southern American English) and staff, with two plurals, analogical staffs and inherited staves.
4. Loss of final /e/, resulting in voiced fricatives at the end of a word where only voiceless fricatives had occurred. That is the source of the modern distinctions teeth vs. to teethe, half vs. to halve, house vs. to house.
5. Reduction of double consonants to single consonants, which explains the contrast between kiss, to kiss (Old English coss, cyssan, with a double s) vs. house, to house with /z/ in the verb (Old English hūs, hūsian, with a single s).
6. A sandhi that introduced the voiced fricative /ð/, instead of original /θ/, at the beginning of unstressed function words. Contrast this with initial /ð/ vs. thistle with initial /θ/.
7. A sound change that caused fricatives to be voiced after a fully unstressed syllable. That is reflected in the modern pronunciation of the endings that are spelled -s (the noun plural ending, the 'Saxon genitive' ending and the third-person present indicative ending), which now have the phonemic shape -/z/, having developed in Middle English from -[əs] to -[əz] and then, after the deletion of the unstressed vowel, to -/z/ (e.g. halls, tells from earlier halles, telles). The sound change also affects function words ending in original -/s/ that are normally unstressed. Contrast this with /s/ vs. is with /z/; off with /f/ vs. of with /v/, originally the same word; with with /ð/ in many varieties of English vs. pith with /θ/.

The status of the sources in Chaucer's Middle English is as follows:

- The first three sources (borrowing, dialect mixture and analogy) were already established.
- As indicated by versification, the loss of final /e/ was normal in Chaucer's time before a vowel-initial word and optional elsewhere. That is assumed to be a poetic relic, with the loss of final /e/ having been completed in spoken English (a similar situation to Modern French; see e muet).
- The reduction of double consonants was apparently about to occur.
- The sandhi effects on unstressed function words occurred somewhat later, during the transition to Modern English.

The strongest distinction was between /f/ and /v/ because of the large number of borrowings from Old French. It is also the only distinction that is consistently indicated in spelling, as ⟨f⟩ and ⟨v⟩ respectively. /z/ sometimes appears as ⟨z⟩, especially in borrowings from Greek, and sometimes as ⟨s⟩. Both /θ/ and /ð/ are spelled ⟨th⟩.

=== Vowels ===
Middle English vowels
		Monophthong		Diphthong	
		Short	Long	+ /j/	+ /w/
Close	Front	i→**ɪ** • y	iː • yː	—	iw
Close	Back	u→**ʊ**	uː	uj	—
Close-mid	Front	e→**ɛ** • ø	eː • øː	ej→iː	ew→iw
Close-mid	Back	o→**ɔ**	oː	oj→uj	ow→ɔw (early), uː (late)^{1}
Mid		(**ə**)			
Open-mid	Front		ɛː • œː	ɛj	ɛw
Open-mid	Back		ɔː	ɔj	ɔw
Open		a	**aː**	æj→ɛj	ɒw

^{1} The Old English sequences /oːw/, /oːɣ/ produced late Middle English /ɔw/ and had apparently passed through early Middle English /ow/: OE grōwan ('grow') /ˈgroːwən/→ LME /ˈɡrɔwə/. However, early Middle English /owx/ that was produced by Middle English breaking became late Middle English /uːh/: OE tōh (tough') /toːx/→ EME /towx/ → LME /tuːx/. Apparently, early /ow/ became /ɔw/ before the occurrence of Middle English breaking, which generated new occurrences of /ow/, which later became /uː/.

==== Monophthongs ====
Middle English had a distinction between close-mid and open-mid long vowels but no corresponding distinction in short vowels. The behaviour of open syllable lengthening seems to indicate that the short vowels were open-mid in quality, but according to Lass, they were close-mid. (There is some direct documentary evidence: in early texts, open-mid /ɛː/ was spelled ⟨ea⟩, but both /e/ and /eː/ were spelled ⟨eo⟩.) Later, the short vowels were in fact lowered to become open-mid vowels, as is shown by their values in Modern English.

The front rounded vowels /y yː ø øː œː/ existed in the southwest dialects of Middle English, which developed from the standard Late West Saxon dialect of Old English, but not in the standard Middle English dialect of London. The close vowels /y/ and /yː/ are direct descendants of the corresponding Old English vowels and were indicated as ⟨u⟩. (In the standard dialect of Middle English, the sounds became /i/ and /iː/; in Kentish, they became /e/ and /eː/.) /yː/ may have existed in learned speech in loanwords from Old French, also spelled ⟨u⟩, but, as it merged with /iw/, becoming /juː/ in Modern English, rather than /iː/, it can be assumed that /iw/ was the vernacular pronunciation that was used in French-derived words.

The mid-front rounded vowels /ø øː œː/ likewise had existed in the southwest dialects but not in the standard Middle English dialect of London and were indicated as ⟨o⟩. Sometime in the 13th century, they became unrounded and merged with the normal front mid vowels. They derived from the Old English diphthongs /eo̯/ and /eːo̯/. There is no direct evidence that there was ever a distinction between open-mid /œː/ and close-mid /øː/, but it can be assumed because of the corresponding distinction in the unrounded mid front vowels. /øː/ would have derived directly from Old English /eːo̯/, and /œː/ derived from the open syllable lengthening of short /ø/, from the Old English short diphthong /eo̯/.

The quality of the short open vowel is unclear. In early Middle English, it was presumably central /a/ since it represented the coalescence of the Old English vowels /æ/ and /ɑ/. During Middle English breaking, it could not have been a front vowel since /u/ rather than /i/ was introduced after it. During Early Modern English, it was fronted in most environments to [æ] in southern England, and it and even closer values are found in the contemporary speech of southern England, North America and the Southern Hemisphere. It remains [a] in much of Northern England, Scotland and the Caribbean. Meanwhile, the long open vowel, which developed later because of open syllable lengthening, was [aː]. It was gradually fronted, to successively [æː], [ɛː] and [eː], in the 16th and the 17th centuries.

==== Diphthongs ====
All of the above diphthongs came about during the Middle English. Old English had a number of diphthongs, but all of them had been reduced to monophthongs in the transition to Middle English. Diphthongs in Middle English came about by various processes and at various time periods and tended to change their quality over time. The changes above occurred mostly between early and late Middle English. Early Middle English had a distinction between open-mid and close-mid diphthongs, and all of the close-mid diphthongs had been eliminated by late Middle English.

The following processes produced the above diphthongs:

- Reinterpretation of Old English sequences of a vowel followed by Old English /ɣ/ (which became /w/ after back vowels and /ʝ/ after front vowels) or with pre-existing /j/, /w/:
  - OE weġ ('way') /weʝ/→ EME /wɛj/
  - OE dæġ ('day') /daʝ/ → ME /dæj/ → LME /dɛj/
- Middle English breaking before /h/ ([x] after back vowels, [ç] after front vowels)
- Borrowing, especially from Old French

== Phonological processes ==
The following sections describe the major phonological processes occurring between written Late West Saxon, the standard written form of Old English, and the end of Middle English, which is conventionally dated to around 1500 AD.

=== Homorganic lengthening ===
In late Old English, vowels were lengthened before certain clusters: /nd/, /ld/, /rd/, /mb/, /ŋɡ/. Later, the vowels in many of those words were shortened again, which gives the appearance that no lengthening happened, but evidence from the Ormulum indicates otherwise. For details see Phonological history of Old English: Vowel lengthening.

=== Stressed vowel changes ===
Late West Saxon, the standard written form of Old English, included matched pairs of short and long vowels, including seven pairs of pure vowels (the monophthongs /ɑ(ː)/ /æ(ː)/ /e(ː)/ /i(ː)/ /o(ː)/ /u(ː)/ /y(ː)/) and two pairs of height-harmonic diphthongs: /æ(ː)ɑ̯/ and /e(ː)o̯/. Two additional pairs of diphthongs, /i(ː)u̯/ and /i(ː)y̯/, existed in earlier Old English but had been reduced to /e(ː)o̯/ and /y(ː)/, respectively, by late Old English.

In the transition to Middle English, the system underwent major changes by eliminating the diphthongs and leaving only one pair of low vowels but with a vowel distinction appearing in the long mid vowels:

- The diphthongs /æɑ̯/ /æːɑ̯/ simplified to /æ/ and /æː/, respectively. Subsequently, the low vowels were modified as follows:
  - /æ/ and /ɑ/ merged to a single central vowel /a/.
  - /æː/ and /ɑː/ rose to /ɛː/ and /ɔː/, respectively.
- The diphthongs /eo̯/ and /eːo̯/ (as in OE ċēosan 'to choose', frēond 'friend', and sċēotan 'to shoot') respectively simplified to new front-round vowels /ø/ and /øː/ (yielding /tʃøːzən/, /frøːnd/, and /ʃøːtən/ respectively). Everywhere except in the southwest, /ø/ and /øː/ were soon respectively backened to /o/ and /oː/ between a palatal consonant and a following syllable (yielding Middle English cheosen /tʃoːzən/ 'to choose' and shoten /ʃoːtən/ 'to shoot'), and unrounded to /e/ and /eː/ (yielding Middle English freend /freːnd/ 'friend') everywhere else. In the southwest, it took 200 or 300 years for the process to take place, and in the meantime, the sounds were spelled ⟨o⟩ in texts there.
- The front rounded vowels /y/ and /yː/ unrounded to /i/ and /iː/ respectively everywhere but in the southwest (the former West Saxon area) and the southeast (former Kentish area).
  - In the southwest, the front rounded vowels /y/ and /yː/ remained, and were spelled ⟨u⟩.
  - In the southeast, the vowels had already been unrounded to /e/ and /eː/ respectively in Old English and remained as such in Middle English.

That left an asymmetric system consisting of five short vowels /a/ /e/ /i/ /o/ /u/ and six long vowels /ɛː/ /eː/ /iː/ /ɔː/ /oː/ /uː/, with additional front rounded vowels /ø(ː)/ /y(ː)/ in the southwest. Some symmetry was restored by open syllable lengthening, which restored a long low vowel /aː/.

=== Reduction and loss of unstressed vowels ===
Unstressed vowels were gradually confused in late Old English although spelling lagged behind because a standardized spelling system existed. By Early Middle English, all unstressed vowels were written ⟨e⟩, which probably represented /ə/. Also, in late Old English, final unstressed /m/ became /n/; during the Middle English period, this final /n/ was dropped when it was part of an inflectional syllable but remained when part of the root like seven or in derivational endings like written). Around Chaucer's time, final /ə/ was dropped. Inflectional evidence suggests that occurred first when the following word began with a vowel. A century or so later, unstressed /ə/ also dropped in the plural genitive ending -es (spelled -s in Modern English) and the past ending -ed.

The changes steadily effaced most inflectional endings:

- OE mētan → ME meete(n) → LME /meːt/ → NE meet /miːt/
- OE wicu → ME weeke → LME /weːk/ → NE week /wiːk/
- OE nama → ME nāme → LME /næːm/ → NE name /neɪ̯m/

In the last two examples, the stressed vowel was affected by open-syllable lengthening.

=== Vocalization of [ɣ] and development of new diphthongs ===
The sound [ɣ], which had been a post-vocalic allophone of /ɡ/, became vocalized to [u]. This occurred around the year 1200.

A new set of diphthongs developed from combinations of vowel+[u] (either from [ɣ] or from pre-existing /w/) or vowel+[i] (from pre-existing /j/) and also from French loanwords: see Diphthongs above.

=== Breaking ===
During the 12th or the 13th century, /i/ was inserted between a front vowel and a following /h/ (pronounced [ç] in this context), and a vowel /u/ was inserted between a back vowel and a following /h/ (pronounced [x] in this context). A short /a/ was treated as a back vowel in the process; the long equivalent did not occur in the relevant context. See H-loss below.

=== Open-syllable lengthening ===
Around the 13th century, short vowels were lengthened in an open syllable (when they followed by a single consonant that in turn was followed by another vowel). In addition, non-low vowels were lowered: /i/ → /eː/, /e/ → /ɛː/, /u/ → /oː/, /o/ → /ɔː/. That accounts, for example, for the vowel difference between staff and the alternative plural staves (Middle English staf vs. stāves, with open-syllable lengthening in the latter word). The process was restricted in the following ways:

1. It did not occur when two or more syllables followed because of the opposing process of trisyllabic laxing.
2. It only occasionally applied to the high vowels /i/ and /u/, e.g. OE wudu → ME /woːd/ → wood; OE wicu → ME /weːk/ → week. Most instances of /i/ and /u/ remained as such: OE hnutu → NE nut, OE riden → NE ridden.

The effects of open-syllable lengthening and trisyllabic laxing often led to differences in the stem vowel between singular and plural/genitive. Generally, such differences were regularized by analogy in one direction or another but not in a consistent way:

- ME path, pāthes → NE path, paths, but ME whal, whāles → NE whale, whales
- ME crādel, cradeles → NE cradle, cradles, but ME sādel, sadeles → NE saddle, saddles

=== Trisyllabic laxing ===
In late Old English, vowels were shortened before clusters of two consonants when two or more syllables followed. Later in Middle English, the process was expanded, and applied to all vowels when two or more syllables followed. This led to the Modern English variations between divine vs. divinity, school vs. scholarly, grateful vs. gratitude, etc. In some cases, later changes have led to apparently anomalous results, e.g. south vs. southern with only two syllables (but /suːðernə/ while trisyllabic laxing applied). The effects of this change are still commonly seen in Modern English, and the resulting patterns remain productive in part.

=== Pre-cluster shortening ===
In late Old English, vowels were shortened before clusters of three consonants:

- OE gāst → NE ghost /ɡoʊ̯st/; OE gāstliċ → NE ghastly /ˈɡæstli/, /ˈɡɑːstli/
- OE ċild → NE child /tʃaɪ̯ld/; OE ċildru + OE -an → NE children /ˈtʃɪldrən/
- OE gōd → NE good; OE gōdspell → NE gospel

As shown by ghastly, this shortening occurred before the raising of OE /ɑː/ to EME /ɔː/, which occurred in the transition to Middle English.

Later in Middle English, vowels were shortened before clusters of two consonants, except before /st/ and in some cases where homorganic lengthening applied. Examples:

- OE cēpte → kept (cf. OE cēpan → keep)
- OE mētte → met (cf. OE mētan → meet)

=== Reduction of double consonants ===
Double (geminated) consonants were reduced to single ones. This took place after open syllable lengthening; the syllable before a geminate was a closed syllable and so vowels were not lengthened before (originally) doubled consonants. The loss of gemination may have been stimulated by its small functional load since few minimal pairs of words existed that were distinguished solely by that feature.

=== H-loss ===
The phoneme /h/, when it occurred in the syllable coda, is believed to have had two allophones: the voiceless palatal fricative [ç], occurring after front vowels, and the voiceless velar fricative [x], occurring after back vowels. The usual spelling in both cases was ⟨gh⟩, which is retained today in words like night and taught.

Those sounds were lost during later Middle English and early modern English. The timing of the process depended on the dialect; the fricatives were still pronounced in some educated speech in the 16th century, but they had disappeared by the late 17th. Loss of the fricatives was accompanied by some compensatory lengthening or diphthongization of preceding vowels. In some cases, the velar fricative [x] developed into /f/; as such, the preceding vowel was shortened, and the [u] of a diphthong was absorbed. Some developments are illustrated below:

- OE niht ('night') → ME /niht/ [niçt] → /niːt/ → NE /naɪt/ (by the Great Vowel Shift)
- OE hlæhhan ('to laugh') → ME [ˈlauxə] → LLME /laf/ → ENE /laːf/ → NE /læ(ː)f, lɑːf/
- OE tōh ('tough') → ME [tuːx] → LLME /tuf/ → NE /tʌf/

The variable outcome, along with other variable changes and the ambiguity of the Middle English spelling ⟨ou⟩ (either /ou̯/ or /uː/ in Early Middle English), accounts for the numerous pronunciations of Modern English words in -ough- (e.g. though, through, bough, rough, trough, thought, with -ough- pronounced /ou/, /uː/, /au/, /ʌf/, /ɒf/, /ɔː/ respectively).

/h/ spelled -gh- is realized as [x] even today in some traditional dialects of northern England and more famously in Scots. Some accents in northern England lack the /x/ and instead exhibit special vowel developments in some such words: night as /niːt/ (sounds like neat) and in the dialectal words owt and nowt (from aught and naught, pronounced like out and nout, meaning 'anything' and 'nothing').

The modern phoneme /x/ most commonly appears today in the typically-Scottish word loch and in names such as Buchan. There, the /x/ is usual in Scotland although the alternative /k/ is becoming more common among some younger speakers. The same is true in Wales, in names such as Loughor. English-speakers from elsewhere may replace the /x/ in such cases with /k/, but some use /x/ in imitation of the local pronunciations as they may in certain foreign words such as Bach, Kharkiv, Sakhalin and chutzpah.

=== Great Vowel Shift ===
The Great Vowel Shift was a fundamental change in late Middle English (post-Chaucer) and Early Modern English that affected the pronunciation of all of the long vowels. The high vowels /iː/ and /uː/ were diphthongized, ultimately producing the modern diphthongs /aɪ̯/ and /aʊ̯/, and all other vowels were raised.

=== Diphthong loss ===
This is not normally considered a part of the Great Vowel Shift, but during the same time period, most pre-existing Middle English diphthongs were monophthongized:

- /ai̯/ → ENE /ɛː/ → /eː/ → NE /eɪ̯/
- /au̯/ → ENE /ɔː/
- /ɔu̯/ → ENE /oː/ → NE /oʊ̯/

The remaining diphthongs developed as follows:

- /ɛu̯/, /iu̯/ → ENE /ɪu̯/ → NE /juː/. /ɪu̯/ is still used in Welsh English.
- /ɔi̯/, /ui̯/ → NE /ɔɪ̯/

== Vowel equivalents from Old English to Modern English ==
For a detailed description of the changes between Old English and Middle and Modern English, see the article on the phonological history of English. A summary of the main vowel changes is presented below. The spelling of Modern English largely reflects Middle English pronunciation.

=== Monophthongs ===
This table presents the general developments. Many exceptional outcomes occurred in particular environments. For example, vowels were often lengthened in late Old English before /ld/, /nd/, /mb/, and vowels changed in complex ways before /r/ throughout the history of English. Vowels were diphthongized in Middle English before /h/, and new diphthongs arose in Middle English by the combination of vowels with Old English ⟨w⟩, ⟨g⟩ /ɣ/ → /w/, and ⟨ġ⟩ /j/. For more information, see the section below. The only conditional development considered in detail below is Middle English open-syllable lengthening. In the column on modern spelling, CV means a sequence of a single consonant followed by a vowel.

NOTE: In this table, abbreviations are used as follows:

- OE = Old English
- WS = West Saxon (dialect of Old English)
- ME = Middle English
- NE = Modern English
- GA = General American (generalised U.S. accent of Modern English)
- RP = Received Pronunciation (prestige British accent of Modern English)
- AN = Anglo-Norman
- leng. = lengthened by open-syllable lengthening
- occ. = occasionally
- > = produces by regular sound change
- >! = produces by analogy or irregular change

Late Old English (Anglian), c. 1000	Middle English pronunciation, c. 1400	Modern English spelling, c. 1500	Early Modern English pronunciation, c. 1600	Modern English pronunciation, c. 2000	Source	Example
a; æ; ea; ā+CC; often ǣ+CC,ēa+CC; occ. ē+CC (WS ǣ+CC)	/a/	a	/a/	/æ/	OE a	OE mann > man; OE lamb > lamb; OE sang > sang; OE sacc > sack; OE assa > ass (donkey)
a; æ; ea; ā+CC; often ǣ+CC,ēa+CC; occ. ē+CC (WS ǣ+CC)	/a/	a	/a/	/æ/	OE æ	OE fæþm > fathom; OE sæt > sat; OE æt > at; OE mæsse > mass (at church)
a; æ; ea; ā+CC; often ǣ+CC,ēa+CC; occ. ē+CC (WS ǣ+CC)	/a/	a	/a/	/æ/	OE ea	OE weax > wax; OE healf > half /hæf/ (GA)
a; æ; ea; ā+CC; often ǣ+CC,ēa+CC; occ. ē+CC (WS ǣ+CC)	/a/	a	/a/	/æ/	OE +CC	OE āscian > ask /æsk/ (GA); OE fǣtt > fat; OE lǣstan > to last /læst/ (GA) ; OE blēddre (WS blǣddre) > bladder; OE brēmbel (WS brǣmbel) > bramble
a; æ; ea; ā+CC; often ǣ+CC,ēa+CC; occ. ē+CC (WS ǣ+CC)	/a/	a	/a/	(w+, not +g,ck,ng,nk) GA /ɑ/, RP /ɒ/	OE a	OE swan > swan; OE wasċan > to wash; OE wann dark > wan
a; æ; ea; ā+CC; often ǣ+CC,ēa+CC; occ. ē+CC (WS ǣ+CC)	/a/	a	/a/	(w+, not +g,ck,ng,nk) GA /ɑ/, RP /ɒ/	OE æ	OE swæþ > swath; OE wæsp > wasp
a; æ; ea; ā+CC; often ǣ+CC,ēa+CC; occ. ē+CC (WS ǣ+CC)	/a/	a	/a/	(w+, not +g,ck,ng,nk) GA /ɑ/, RP /ɒ/	OE ea	OE wealwian > to wallow; OE swealwe > swallow (bird)
a; æ; ea; ā+CC; often ǣ+CC,ēa+CC; occ. ē+CC (WS ǣ+CC)	/a/	a	/a/	(+r) /ar/ > GA /ɑr/, RP /ɑː/		OE heard > hard; OE ærc (WS earc) > ark
a; æ; ea; ā+CC; often ǣ+CC,ēa+CC; occ. ē+CC (WS ǣ+CC)	/a/	a	/a/	(w+ and +r) /ɔr/ > GA /ɔr/, RP /ɔː/	OE ea	OE swearm > swarm; OE sweart > old poetic swart >! swarthy; OE weardian > to ward; OE wearm > warm; OE wearnian > to warn
a; æ; ea; ā+CC; often ǣ+CC,ēa+CC; occ. ē+CC (WS ǣ+CC)	/a/	a	/a/	(+lC,l#) /ɔː/		OE smæl > small; OE all (WS eall) > all; OE walcian (WS wealcian) to roll > to walk
a; æ; ea; ā+CC; often ǣ+CC,ēa+CC; occ. ē+CC (WS ǣ+CC)	/a/	a	/a/	(+lm) GA /ɑ/, RP /ɑː/		OE ælmesse > alms; Latin palma > OE 'palm > palm
a; æ; ea; ā+CC; often ǣ+CC,ēa+CC; occ. ē+CC (WS ǣ+CC)	/a/	a	/a/	(RP, often +f,s,th) /ɑː/		OE glæs > glass; OE græs > grass; OE pæþ > path; OE æfter > after; OE āscian /ɑːsk/ > to ask; OE lǣstan /lɑːst/ > to last
a; æ; ea; ā+CC; often ǣ+CC,ēa+CC; occ. ē+CC (WS ǣ+CC)	(leng.) /aː/ [æː]	aCV	/ɛː/	/eː/ > /eɪ/	OE a	OE nama > name; OE nacod > naked; OE bacan > to bake
a; æ; ea; ā+CC; often ǣ+CC,ēa+CC; occ. ē+CC (WS ǣ+CC)	(leng.) /aː/ [æː]	aCV	/ɛː/	/eː/ > /eɪ/	OE æ	OE æcer > acre; OE hwæl > whale; OE hræfn > raven
a; æ; ea; ā+CC; often ǣ+CC,ēa+CC; occ. ē+CC (WS ǣ+CC)	(leng.) /aː/ [æː]	aCV	/ɛː/	(+r) /eːr/ > GA /ɛr/, RP /ɛə/	OE a	OE caru > care; OE faran > to fare; OE starian > to stare
e; eo; occ. y; ē+CC; ēo+CC; occ. ǣ+CC,ēa+CC	/e/	e	/ɛ/	/ɛ/	OE e	OE helpan > to help; OE elh (WS eolh) > elk; OE tellan > to tell; OE betera > better; OE streċċan > to stretch
e; eo; occ. y; ē+CC; ēo+CC; occ. ǣ+CC,ēa+CC	/e/	e	/ɛ/	/ɛ/	OE eo	OE seofon > seven
e; eo; occ. y; ē+CC; ēo+CC; occ. ǣ+CC,ēa+CC	/e/	e	/ɛ/	/ɛ/	OE y	OE myriġ > merry; OE byrġan > to bury /ˈbɛri/; OE lyft- weak > left (hand); OE cnyll > knell
e; eo; occ. y; ē+CC; ēo+CC; occ. ǣ+CC,ēa+CC	/e/	e	/ɛ/	/ɛ/	OE +CC	OE cēpte > kept; OE mētte > met; OE bēcnan (WS bīecnan) > to beckon; OE clǣnsian > to cleanse; OE flǣsċ > flesh; OE lǣssa > less; OE frēond > friend /frɛnd/; OE þēofþ (WS þīefþ) > theft; OE hēold > held
e; eo; occ. y; ē+CC; ēo+CC; occ. ǣ+CC,ēa+CC	/e/	(+r) ar	/ar/	GA /ɑr/, RP /ɑː/		OE heorte > heart; OE bercan (WS beorcan) > to bark; OE teoru (WS teru) > tar; OE steorra > star
e; eo; occ. y; ē+CC; ēo+CC; occ. ǣ+CC,ēa+CC	/e/	(+r) ar	/ar/	(w+ and +r) /ɔr/ > GA /ɔr/, RP /ɔː/		AN werra > war; AN werbler > to warble
e; eo; occ. y; ē+CC; ēo+CC; occ. ǣ+CC,ēa+CC	/e/	(occ. +r) er	/ɛr/	/ər/ > GA /ər/, RP /ɜː/	OE e	OE sterne (WS stierne, styrne) > stern
e; eo; occ. y; ē+CC; ēo+CC; occ. ǣ+CC,ēa+CC	/e/	(occ. +r) er	/ɛr/	/ər/ > GA /ər/, RP /ɜː/	OE eo	OE eorl > earl; OE eorþe > earth; OE liornian, leornian > to learn
e; eo; occ. y; ē+CC; ēo+CC; occ. ǣ+CC,ēa+CC	/e/	(occ. +r) er	/ɛr/	/ər/ > GA /ər/, RP /ɜː/	OE +CC	OE hērde (WS hīerde) > heard
e; eo; occ. y; ē+CC; ēo+CC; occ. ǣ+CC,ēa+CC	(leng.) /ɛː/	ea,eCV	/eː/	/iː/, [ɪi]		OE specan > to speak; OE mete > meat; OE beofor > beaver; OE meotan (WS metan) > to mete /miːt/; OE eotan (WS etan) > to eat; OE meodu (WS medu) > mead; OE yfel > evil
e; eo; occ. y; ē+CC; ēo+CC; occ. ǣ+CC,ēa+CC	(leng.) /ɛː/	ea,eCV	/eː/	(+r) /iːr/ > GA /ɪr/, RP /ɪə/		OE spere > spear; OE mere > mere (lake)
e; eo; occ. y; ē+CC; ēo+CC; occ. ǣ+CC,ēa+CC	(leng.) /ɛː/	ea,eCV	/eː/	(occ.) /eɪ/		OE brecan > to break /breɪk/
e; eo; occ. y; ē+CC; ēo+CC; occ. ǣ+CC,ēa+CC	(leng.) /ɛː/	ea,eCV	/eː/	(occ. +r) /eːr/ > GA /ɛr/, RP /ɛə/		OE beoran (WS beran) > to bear; OE pere, peru > pear; OE swerian > to swear; OE wer man > were-
e; eo; occ. y; ē+CC; ēo+CC; occ. ǣ+CC,ēa+CC	(leng.) /ɛː/	ea,eCV	/eː/	(often +th,d,t,v) /ɛ/		OE leþer > leather /lɛðɚ/; OE stede > stead; OE weder > weather; OE heofon > heaven; OE hefiġ > heavy
i; y; ī+CC,ȳ+CC; occ. ēoc,ēc; occ. ī+CV,ȳ+CV	/i/	i	/ɪ/	/ɪ/	OE i	OE writen > written; OE sittan > to sit; OE fisċ > fish; OE lifer > liver
i; y; ī+CC,ȳ+CC; occ. ēoc,ēc; occ. ī+CV,ȳ+CV	/i/	i	/ɪ/	/ɪ/	OE y	OE bryċġ > bridge; OE cyssan > to kiss; OE dyde > did; OE synn > sin; OE gyldan > to gild; OE bysiġ > busy /ˈbɪzi/
i; y; ī+CC,ȳ+CC; occ. ēoc,ēc; occ. ī+CV,ȳ+CV	/i/	i	/ɪ/	/ɪ/	OE +CC	OE wīsdōm > wisdom; OE fīftiġ > fifty; OE wȳsċan > to wish; OE cȳþþ(u) > kith; OE fȳst > fist
i; y; ī+CC,ȳ+CC; occ. ēoc,ēc; occ. ī+CV,ȳ+CV	/i/	i	/ɪ/	/ɪ/	OE ȳ+CV,ī+CV	OE ċīcen > chicken; OE lȳtel > little
i; y; ī+CC,ȳ+CC; occ. ēoc,ēc; occ. ī+CV,ȳ+CV	/i/	i	/ɪ/	/ɪ/	OE ēoc,ēc	OE sēoc > sick; OE wēoce > wick; OE ēc + nama > ME eke-name >! nickname
i; y; ī+CC,ȳ+CC; occ. ēoc,ēc; occ. ī+CV,ȳ+CV	/i/	i	/ɪ/	(+r) /ər/ > GA /ər/, RP /ɜː/		OE gyrdan > to gird; OE fyrst > first; OE styrian > to stir
i; y; ī+CC,ȳ+CC; occ. ēoc,ēc; occ. ī+CV,ȳ+CV	(leng. — occ.) /eː/	ee	/iː/	/iː/, [ɪi]		OE wicu > week; OE pilian > to peel; OE bitela > beetle
o; ō+CC	/o/	o	/ɔ/	GA /ɑ/, RP /ɒ/	OE o	OE god > god; OE beġeondan > beyond
o; ō+CC	/o/	o	/ɔ/	GA /ɑ/, RP /ɒ/	OE +CC	OE gōdspell > gospel; OE fōddor > fodder; OE fōstrian > to foster
o; ō+CC	/o/	o	/ɔ/	(GA, +f,s,th,g,ng) /ɔː/		OE moþþe > moth; OE cros > cross; OE frost > frost; OE of > off; OE oft > oft; OE sōfte > soft
o; ō+CC	/o/	o	/ɔ/	(+r) /ɔr/ > GA /ɔr/, RP /ɔː/		OE corn > corn; OE storc > storc; OE storm > storm
o; ō+CC	(leng.) /ɔː/	oa,oCV	/oː/	GA /oʊ/, RP /əʊ/		OE fola > foal; OE nosu > nose; OE ofer > over
o; ō+CC	(leng.) /ɔː/	oa,oCV	/oː/	(+r) /oːr/ > GA /ɔr/, RP /ɔː/		OE borian > to bore; OE fore > fore; OE bord > board
u; occ. y; ū+CC; w+ e,eo,o,y +r	/u/	u,o	/ʊ/	/ʌ/	OE u	OE bucc > buck /bʌk/; OE lufian > to love /lʌv/; OE uppe > up; OE on bufan > above
u; occ. y; ū+CC; w+ e,eo,o,y +r	/u/	u,o	/ʊ/	/ʌ/	OE y	OE myċel > ME muchel >! much; OE blysċan > to blush; OE cyċġel > cudgel; OE clyċċan > to clutch; OE sċytel > shuttle
u; occ. y; ū+CC; w+ e,eo,o,y +r	/u/	u,o	/ʊ/	/ʌ/	OE +CC	OE dūst > dust; OE tūsc > tusk; OE rūst > rust
u; occ. y; ū+CC; w+ e,eo,o,y +r	/u/	u,o	/ʊ/	(b,f,p+ and +l,sh) /ʊ/		OE full > full /fʊl/; OE bula > bull; OE bysċ > bush
u; occ. y; ū+CC; w+ e,eo,o,y +r	/u/	u,o	/ʊ/	(+r) /ər/ > GA /ər/, RP /ɜː/	OE u	OE spurnan > to spurn
u; occ. y; ū+CC; w+ e,eo,o,y +r	/u/	u,o	/ʊ/	(+r) /ər/ > GA /ər/, RP /ɜː/	OE y	OE ċyriċe > church; OE byrþen > burden; OE hyrdel > hurdle
u; occ. y; ū+CC; w+ e,eo,o,y +r	/u/	u,o	/ʊ/	(+r) /ər/ > GA /ər/, RP /ɜː/	OE w+,+r	OE word > word; OE werc (WS weorc) > work; OE werold > world; OE wyrm > worm; OE wersa (WS wiersa) > worse; OE weorþ > worth
u; occ. y; ū+CC; w+ e,eo,o,y +r	(leng. — occ.) /oː/	oo	/uː/	/uː/, [ʊu]		OE (brȳd)-guma > ME (bride)-gome >! (bride)-groom
u; occ. y; ū+CC; w+ e,eo,o,y +r	(leng. — occ.) /oː/	oo	/uː/	(+r) /uːr/ > /oːr/ > GA /ɔr/, RP /ɔː/		OE duru > door
u; occ. y; ū+CC; w+ e,eo,o,y +r	(leng. — occ.) /oː/	oo	/uː/	(often +th,d,t) /ʌ/		?
u; occ. y; ū+CC; w+ e,eo,o,y +r	(leng. — occ.) /oː/	oo	/uː/	(occ. +th,d,t) /ʊ/		OE wudu > wood /wʊd/
ā; often a+ld,mb	/ɔː/	oa,oCV	/oː/	GA /oʊ/, RP /əʊ/	OE ā	OE āc > oak; OE hāl > whole
ā; often a+ld,mb	/ɔː/	oa,oCV	/oː/	GA /oʊ/, RP /əʊ/	OE +ld,mb	OE camb > comb; OE ald (WS eald) > old; OE haldan (WS healdan) > to hold
ā; often a+ld,mb	/ɔː/	oa,oCV	/oː/	(+r) /oːr/ > GA /ɔr/, RP /ɔː/		OE ār > oar, ore; OE māra > more; OE bār > boar; OE sār > sore
ǣ; ēa	/ɛː/	ea,eCV	/eː/	/iː/, [ɪi]	OE ǣ	OE hǣlan > to heal /hiːl/; OE hǣtu > heat; OE hwǣte > wheat
ǣ; ēa	/ɛː/	ea,eCV	/eː/	/iː/, [ɪi]	OE ēa	OE bēatan > to beat /biːt/; OE lēaf > leaf; OE ċēap > cheap
ǣ; ēa	/ɛː/	ea,eCV	/eː/	(+r) /iːr/ > GA /ɪr/, RP /ɪə/		OE rǣran > to rear ; OE ēare > ear; OE sēar > sere; OE sēarian > to sear
ǣ; ēa	/ɛː/	ea,eCV	/eː/	(occ.) /eɪ/		OE grēat > great /greɪt/
ǣ; ēa	/ɛː/	ea,eCV	/eː/	(occ. +r) /eːr/ > GA /ɛr/, RP /ɛə/		OE ǣr > ere (before)
ǣ; ēa	/ɛː/	ea,eCV	/eː/	(often +th,d,t) /ɛ/	OE ǣ	OE brǣþ odor > breath; OE swǣtan > to sweat; OE sprǣdan > to spread
ǣ; ēa	/ɛː/	ea,eCV	/eː/	(often +th,d,t) /ɛ/	OE ēa	OE dēad > dead /dɛd/; OE dēaþ death; OE þrēat menace > threat; OE rēad > red; OE dēaf > deaf
ē; ēo; often e+ld	/eː/	ee,ie(nd/ld)	/iː/	/iː/, [ɪi]	OE ē	OE fēdan > to feed; OE grēdiġ (WS grǣdiġ) > greedy; OE mē > me; OE fēt > feet; OE dēd (WS dǣd) > deed; OE nēdl (WS nǣdl) > needle
ē; ēo; often e+ld	/eː/	ee,ie(nd/ld)	/iː/	/iː/, [ɪi]	OE ēo	OE dēop deep; OE fēond > fiend; OE betwēonum > between; OE bēon > to be
ē; ēo; often e+ld	/eː/	ee,ie(nd/ld)	/iː/	/iː/, [ɪi]	OE +ld	OE feld > field; OE ġeldan (WS ġieldan) to pay > to yield
ē; ēo; often e+ld	(often +r) /ɛːr/	ear,erV	/eːr/	/iːr/ > GA /ɪr/, RP /ɪə/	OE ē	OE hēr > here; OE hēran (WS hīeran) > to hear; OE fēr (WS fǣr) > fear
ē; ēo; often e+ld	(often +r) /ɛːr/	ear,erV	/eːr/	/iːr/ > GA /ɪr/, RP /ɪə/	OE ēo	OE dēore (WS dīere) > dear
ē; ēo; often e+ld	(often +r) /ɛːr/	ear,erV	/eːr/	(occ.) /eːr/ > GA /ɛr/, RP /ɛə/		OE þēr (WS þǣr) > there; OE hwēr (WS hwǣr) > where
ē; ēo; often e+ld	(occ. +r) /eːr/	eer	/iːr/	/iːr/ > GA /ɪr/, RP /ɪə/		OE bēor > beer; OE dēor > deer; OE stēran (WS stīeran) > to steer; OE bēr (WS bǣr) > bier
ī; ȳ; often i+ld,mb,nd; often y+ld,mb,nd	/iː/	i,iCV	/əi/	/aɪ/	OE ī	OE rīdan > to ride; OE tīma > time; OE hwīt > white; OE mīn > mine (of me)
ī; ȳ; often i+ld,mb,nd; often y+ld,mb,nd	/iː/	i,iCV	/əi/	/aɪ/	OE ȳ	OE mȳs > mice; OE brȳd > bride; OE hȳdan > to hide
ī; ȳ; often i+ld,mb,nd; often y+ld,mb,nd	/iː/	i,iCV	/əi/	/aɪ/	OE +ld,mb,nd	OE findan > to find; OE ċild > child; OE climban > to climb; OE mynd > mind
ī; ȳ; often i+ld,mb,nd; often y+ld,mb,nd	/iː/	i,iCV	/əi/	(+r) /air/ > GA /aɪr/, RP /aɪə/		OE fȳr > fire; OE hȳrian > to hire; OE wīr > wire
ō; occ. ēo	/oː/	oo	/uː/	/uː/, [ʊu]	OE ō	OE mōna > moon; OE sōna > soon; OE fōd > food /fuːd/; OE dōn > to do
ō; occ. ēo	/oː/	oo	/uː/	/uː/, [ʊu]	OE ēo	OE ċēosan > to choose; OE sċēotan > to shoot
ō; occ. ēo	/oː/	oo	/uː/	(+r) /uːr/ > /oːr/ > GA /ɔr/, RP /ɔː/		OE flōr > floor; OE mōr > moor
ō; occ. ēo	/oː/	oo	/uː/	(occ. +th,d,v) /ʌ/		OE blōd > blood /blʌd/; OE mōdor > mother /mʌðə(r)/; OE glōf > glove /glʌv/
ō; occ. ēo	/oː/	oo	/uː/	(often +th,d,t,k) /ʊ/		OE gōd > good /gʊd/; OE bōc > book /bʊk/; OE lōcian > to look /lʊk/; OE fōt > foot /fʊt/
ū; often u+nd	/uː/	ou	/əu/	/aʊ/	OE ū	OE mūs > mouse; OE ūt, ūte > out; OE hlūd > loud
ū; often u+nd	/uː/	ou	/əu/	/aʊ/	OE +nd	OE ġefunden > found; OE hund > hound; OE ġesund > sound (safe)
ū; often u+nd	/uː/	ou	/əu/	(+r) /aur/ > GA /aʊr/, RP /aʊə/	OE	OE ūre > our; OE sċūr > shower; OE sūr > sour
ū; often u+nd	/uː/	ou	/əu/	(occ. +t) /ʌ/		OE būtan > but; OE strūtian > ME strouten > to strut

The Modern English vowel that is usually spelled ⟨au⟩ (Received Pronunciation: /ɔː/, General American: /ɔ/ ~ /ɑ/) does not appear in the above chart. Its main source is late Middle English /au̯/ < early /au̯/ and /ɔu/, which come from various sources: Old English ⟨aw⟩ and ⟨ag⟩ (claw < clawu, law < lagu); diphthongization before /h/ (sought < sōhte, taught < tāhte, daughter < dohtor); borrowings from Latin and French (fawn < Old French faune, Paul < Latin Paulus). Other sources are early modern English lengthening of /a/ before /l/ (salt, all); occasional shortening and later relengthening of Middle English /ɔː/ (broad < /brɔːd/ < brād); and in American English, lengthening of short o before unvoiced fricatives and voiced velars (dog, long, off, cross, moth, all with /ɔ/ in American dialects that still maintain the difference between /ɑ/ and /ɔ/).

As mentioned above, Modern English is derived from the Middle English of London, which is derived largely from Anglian Old English, with some admixture of West Saxon and Kentish. One of the most noticeable differences among the dialects is the handling of original Old English /y/. By the time of the written Old English documents, the Old English of Kent had already unrounded /y/ to /e/, and the late Old English of Anglia unrounded /y/ to /i/. In the West Saxon area, /y/ remained as such well into Middle English times and was written ⟨u⟩ in Middle English documents from the area. Some words with the sound were borrowed into London Middle English, where the unfamiliar /y/ was substituted with /u/:

- gild < gyldan, did < dyde, sin < synn, mind < mynd, dizzy < dysiġ, lift < lyft etc. show the normal (Anglian) development;
- much < myċel shows the West Saxon development;
- merry < myriġ shows the Kentish development;
- bury /ˈbɛri/ < byrġan has its spelling from West Saxon but its pronunciation from Kentish;
- busy /ˈbɪzi/ < bysiġ, build < byldan, buy < bycġan have their spelling from West Saxon but their pronunciation from Anglian.

Some apparent instances of modern ⟨e⟩ for Old English ⟨y⟩ are actually regular developments, particularly if the ⟨y⟩ is a development of earlier (West Saxon) ⟨ie⟩ from i-mutation of ⟨ea⟩, as the normal i-mutation of ⟨ea⟩ in Anglian is ⟨e⟩; for example, stern < styrne < *starnijaz, steel < stȳle < *stahliją (cf. Old Saxon stehli). Also, some apparent instances of modern ⟨u⟩ for Old English ⟨y⟩ may actually be from the influence of a related form with unmutated ⟨u⟩: sundry < syndriġ, influenced by sundor "apart, differently" (compare to sunder and asunder).

=== Diphthongs ===
Note: V means "any vowel"; C means "any consonant"; # means "end of word".

Late Old English (Anglian)	Early Middle English	Late Middle English	Early Modern English	Modern English	Example (Old and Modern English forms given)
æġ, ǣġ	/ai/	/ai/ [æi]	/eː/	/eɪ/	dæġ > day; mæġ > may; mæġden > maiden; næġl > nail; fæġer > fair; clǣġ > clay; grǣġ > gray
eġ, ēġ#	/ɛi/	/ai/ [æi]	/eː/	/eɪ/	weġ > way; pleġan > to play; reġn > rain; leġer > lair; leġde > laid; hēġ (WS hīeġ) > hay
ēġV	/ei/ > /iː/	/iː/	/əi/	/aɪ/	ēage > ēġe > eye; lēogan > lēġan > to lie (deceive); flēoge > flēġe > fly
iġ, īġ, yġ, ȳġ	/iː/	/iː/	/əi/	/aɪ/	tiġel > tile; liġe > (I) lie ("recline"); hīġian > to hie; ryġe > rye; byġe > (I) buy; drȳġe > dry
æw, aw, agV	/au/	/au/	/ɔː/	/ɔː/	clawu > claw; lagu > law; dragan > to draw
ǣw, ēaw, ew, eow	/ɛu/	/ɛu/	/juː/	/(j)uː/	mǣw > mew; lǣwede > lewd; scrēawa > shrew; dēaw > dew
ēw, ēow	/eu/	/iu/	/juː/	/(j)uː/	ċēowan > to chew; hrēowan > to rue; blēow > blew; trēowþ > truth
iw, īw, yw, ȳw	/iu/	/iu/	/juː/	/(j)uː/	hīw > hue; nīwe > new; trīewe (WS) > true; Tīwesdæġ > Tiwesdæġ > Tuesday
āw, āgV, ow, ogV, ōw, ōgV	/ɔu/	/ɔu/	/ou/ > /oː/	/əʊ/ (British), /oʊ/ (American)	cnāwan > to know; crāwa > crow; snāw > snow; sāwol > soul; āgan > to owe; āgen > own; grōwan > to grow; blōwen > blown; boga > bow /bou/; flogen > flown
ugV, ūgV	/uː/	/uː/	/əu/	/aʊ/	fugol > fowl; drugaþ > drouth > drought; būgan > to bow /baʊ/
æh, ah, ag#	/auh/	/auh/	([x] > ∅) /ɔː/	/ɔː/	slæht (WS sleaht) + -or > slaughter
æh, ah, ag#	/auh/	/auh/	([x] > /f/) /af/	/æf/, /ɑːf/	hlæhtor > laughter
eh	/ɛih/	/ɛih/	/ei/ > /eː/	/eɪ/	streht > straight
ēh	/eih/ > /iːh/	/iːh/	/əi/	/aɪ/	hēah > hēh > high; þēoh > þēh > thigh; nēh > nigh
ih, īh, yh, ȳh	/iːh/	/iːh/	/əi/	/aɪ/	reht > riht > right; flyht > flight; līoht > līht > light
āh, āg#, oh, og#	/ɔuh/	/ɔuh/	([x] > ∅) /ou/ > /oː/	/əʊ/ (British), /oʊ/ (American)	dāg > dāh > dough
āh, āg#, oh, og#	/ɔuh/	/ɔuh/	([x] > /f/) /ɔf/	/ɒf/, /ɔːf/	trog > trough
āhC, ohC, ōhC	/ɔuh/	/ɔuh/	/ɔː/	/ɔː/	āhte > ought; dohtor > daughter; þoht > thought; sōhte > sought
ōh#, ōg#	/ouh/ > /uːh/	/uːh/	([x] > ∅) /əu/	/aʊ/	bōg > bough; plōg > plōh > plough
ōh#, ōg#	/ouh/ > /uːh/	/uːh/	([x] > /f/) /ʊf/	(centralized) /ʌf/	ġenōg, ġenōh > enough; tōh > tough; ruh > rough
uh, ug#, ūh, ūg#	/uːh/	/uːh/	([x] > /f/) /ʊf/	(non-centralized) /ʊf/	Weōcetun > Woughton

== Sources ==
- Dobson, E.J. (1968). English pronunciation, 1500–1700. Vol. 2. Oxford: Clarendon Press. OCLC 310545793.
