= Phi features =

Concept in pronoun-noun agreement

In linguistics, especially within generative grammar, phi features (denoted with the Greek letter φ 'phi') are the morphological expression of a semantic process in which a word or morpheme varies with the form of another word or phrase in the same sentence. This variation can include person, number, or gender as encoded in pronominal agreement with nouns and pronouns (the latter are said to consist only of phi-features, containing no lexical head). Several other features are included in the set of phi-features, such as the categorical features ±N (nominal) and ±V (verbal), which can be used to describe lexical categories.

Phi-features are often thought of as the "silent" features that exist on lexical heads (or, according to some theories, within the syntactic structure) that are understood for number, gender, person or reflexivity. Due to their silent nature, phi-features are often only understood if someone is a native speaker of a language, or if the translation includes a gloss of all these features. Many languages exhibit a pro-drop phenomenon which means that they rely on other lexical categories to determine the phi-features of the lexical heads.

== Agreement on nouns ==
Chomsky first proposed that the N node in a clause carries with it all the features to include person, number and gender. In English, we rely on nouns to determine the phi-features of a word, but some other languages rely on inflections of the different parts of speech to determine person, number and gender of the nominal phrases to which they refer. Adjectives also carry phi-features in some languages, however, they tend to agree in number and gender but rarely for person.

=== Number ===
The grammatical term number is the name of the system contrasting singular and plural. In English, number agreement is not expressed through agreement of verbal elements like they are in other languages (though present tense verbs do agree in number with third person subjects). This is partly because English is a language that requires subjects and the subjects in English overtly express number. Instead, English number is a phi-feature that is inflected on nouns when the nominal phrase is plural. The most common in English is -s inflected on nouns that are plural:

- Ducks, fridges, baseballs, cups, books, mirrors, cars, buildings, clowns, bridges, creams....

Some cases of plurality in English require inflection within the noun to express the phi-feature of plurality:

- Men, women, mice, teeth....

Neither verbs nor adjectives are used to agree with the number feature of the noun that they are agreeing with in English.

Some languages, however, like Salish Halkomelem, differ from English in their syntactic categorization of plural marking. Halkomelem allows for both marked and unmarked plural forms of its nouns. It also allows for the determiners to be marked or unmarked in their plurality. Plural nouns and determiners in Halkomelem can be freely combined as well, but it appears that if a determiner is plural in a phrase it is sufficient to pluralize the noun that it modifies:

Plurality in Salish Halkomelem
	noun	determiner	translation
unmarked	swíyeqe	te	man (plural OR singular)
marked	swí:wíqe	ye	men (plural only)

=== Gender ===
English is a language that does not have nominal phrases that belong to a gender class where agreement of other elements in the phrase is required. Dutch is another language that only differentiates between neuter and the common gender. Many other languages of the world do have gender classes. German, for example, has three genders; feminine, masculine and neuter. For a Romance language like Italian, there are feminine and masculine genders. Inflections on the adjectives and determiners are used for gender agreement within the pronominal phrase.

English only expresses gender when the pronoun addresses a specific person who semantically belongs to a certain gender. See the table below for Pronominal Case Forms in English under 3 sg. fem/masc.

In many languages, reflexivity is not overt for person. A prime example is apparent in French se. French se is used to express reflexivity for every expression of the third person, regardless of gender or number. It also functions as a middle, an inchoative, an applicative and an impersonal. For this reason, some theories suggest that reflexive phi-features for languages such as French posit in a level on the syntactic structure that is silent, between the determiner and the noun. This creates a new "silent" projection to a node specifically for φ-reflexives in French structure.

== Agreement on verbs ==
When phi feature agreement occurs on a verb, it typically marks features relating to grammatical function (subject versus object), person, or gender. A key area of verbal agreement is attraction, in which case verbs are sensitive to the grammatical number of a noun phrase that is not the expected controller, but is close in vicinity. In other words, agreement is understood to be a relationship between a probing head and a target goal in the probe's c-command domain.

=== Person agreement ===
In English, agreement on a verb is triggered by the highest DP in subject position of a finite clause. Overt agreement is found only in the present tense, with a 3rd person singular subject, in which case the verb is suffixed with -s:

English walk
	singular	plural
1st person	I walk	We walk
2nd person	You walk	You (all) walk
3rd person	He/she/it walks	They walk

In a null-subject language such as Italian, however, pronominal subjects are not required (in fact, in many null-subject languages, producing overt subjects is a sign of non-nativity). These types of "unstressed" pronouns are called clitic pronouns. Therefore, Italian uses a different inflectional morphology on verbs that is based on the person features of the nominal subject it agrees with:

Italian camminare ('to walk')
	singular	plural
1st person	cammino (I walk)	camminiamo (we walk)
2nd person	cammini (you walk)	camminate (you all walk)
3rd person	cammina (he/she walks)	camminano (they walk)

=== Tense ===
Past tense, present continuous tense and the future tense are the three divisions of time expression of the action of a verb. In languages such as English, verbs agree with their subjects and not their objects. However, in Mohawk, an Indigenous language of North America, verbs agree with their subjects as well as their objects. Interestingly in Mohawk, a predicate can be counted as a verb, like 'big'. As shown in 1a), the form of 'big' changes to express the particular grammatical function, tense.

Ra-kowan-v-hne' ne Sak.
MsS-be.big-STAT-PAST NE Sak
‘Sak used to be big.’

This change utilizes /v-hne/ as can be compared with the verb present in sentence 1b), 'fallen'.

t-yo-ya't-y'-v-hne'
CIS-NsO-body-fall-STAT-PAST
‘It has fallen.'

Example 2) demonstrates the use of 'big' without inflecting for tense (/v-hne/), but instead we see, /-v/.

w-a'shar-owan-v.
NsS-knife-be.big-STAT
"The knife is big; it is a big knife.'

=== Polarity agreement ===
Verb negation in many languages, including English, is not subject to phi-feature agreement. However, there do exist some languages which possess the morphological variance that indicates agreement. As an example, one of these is the Ibibio language in Nigeria. In sentences with an auxiliary verb, the auxiliary verb is directly affixed with a negation agreement morpheme /í/, in place of the typical subject-verb agreement morphemes /á/ or /é/, and the non-auxiliary verb subject-verb agreement also changes in agreement with the negation, despite the fact that only the auxiliary undergoes negation. This double variation is shown in 1a-b), where I in the sentence gloss indicates the agreement affix /í/. In these examples, the verbs are undergoing morphological changes in order to be in agreement with the negation, regardless of whether they are directly negated or not.

Okon i-sʌk-kɔ i-di
Okon I-AUX-NEG I-come
'Okon has still not come (in spite of...)'

Okon i-sɔp-pɔ i-dɔk ekpat.
Okon I-do.quickly-NEG I-make bag
'Okon did not make the bag quickly.'

=== Honorific agreement ===
In certain languages, verb agreement can be controlled by formality, as with Korean subject honorific agreement. When the subject of the sentence is a respected person, the honorific suffix si occurs after the verb root and the honorific subject case marker is Kkeyse in as seen in (3a). Moreover, honorific agreement is optional, as seen in(3b).,

Seonsaengnim-kkeys-e o-si-ess-ta.
teacher-HON.NOM come-HON-past-DEC
‘The teacher came.’

Seonsaengnim-i o-ass-ta.
teacher-NOM come-past-DEC
‘The teacher came.’

There is a debate about whether Korean subject honorific marking is authentic agreement. The debate stems from the fact that languages where verbs show person agreement, the agreement is obligatory. Based on this reason, some scholars contend that since honorific marking is optional, it is not an instance of agreement. However, other scholars others argue that it is indeed agreement. A fundamental quality about honorific marking that is often overlooked is the fact that is it possible only with a human referent. Consequently, as shown by the examples in (4), when the subject is non-human, honorific agreement is ungrammatical.

cha-ka o-(*si)-ess-e.
car-NOM come-HON-PST-DECL
‘The car came.’

kwukhoy-ka ku pepan-ul simuy-ha-(*si)-ess-e
congress-NOM the bill-ACC review-do-HON-PST-DECL
‘The congress reviewed the bill.’

== Phi features as categorizing features ==
Phi-features can also be considered the silent features that determine whether a root word is a noun or a verb. This is called the noun-verb distinction of Distributed Morphology. The table below describes how category classes are organized by their Nominal or Verbal characteristics. Definitions for these four categories of predicates have been described as follows:

A verbal predicate has a predicative use only; a nominal predicate can be used as the head of a term; an adjectival predicate can be used as a modifier of a nominal head; a preposition acts as a term-predicate for which the noun is still the head; an adverbial (not shown below) predicate can be used as a modifier of a non-nominal head.

	+ N	N
+ V	+V +N "adjectival"	+V -N "verb"
V	-V +N "noun"	-V -N "prepositional"

X-bar theory approaches categorical features in this way: when a head X selects its complement to project to X', the XP that it projects to then is a combination of the head X and all of its categorical features, those being either nominal, verbal, adjectival or prepositional features. It has also been argued that adpositions (cover term for prepositions and postpositions) are not part of the [+/-N] [+/-V] system as shown above. This is because they resist being part of a single class category, like nouns, verbs and adjectives do. This argument also posits that some appositions may behave as part of this type of categorization, but not all of them do.

There are three main hypotheses regarding the syntactic categories of words. The first one is the Strong Lexical hypothesis, which states that verbs and nouns are inherent in nature, and when a word such as "walk" in English can surface as either a noun or a verb, depending on the speaker's intuitions of what the meaning of the verb is. This means that the root "walk" in English has two separate lexical entries:

walk N <[AP]> an act or instance of going on foot especially for exercise or pleasure

walk V <[DPtheme]> to move along on foot : advance by steps

=== Syntactic analysis ===
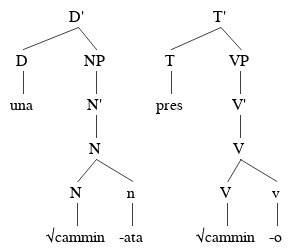
Left is the environment for categorizing a noun; right is the environment for verb categorization.

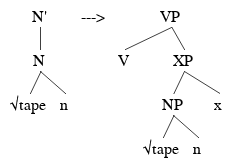
"The verbalizing head takes as its complement a structure that already contains a noun".

This analysis states that the category is determined by syntax or context. A root word is inserted into the syntax as bare and the surrounding syntax determines if it will behave as a verb or a noun. Once the environment has determined its category, morphological inflections also surface on the root according to the determined category. Typically, if the element before it is a determiner, the word will surface as a noun, and if the element before it is a tense element, the root word will surface as a verb. The example in the photo shows an example from Italian. The root of the word is cammin- ("walk"). This word could surface as either a noun or verb. The first tree shows that when the element before is a D "una", the root will be an N and the following morphology will inflect -ata which is the correct full orthography for the noun "walk" in Italian. The tree on the right shows a similar process but in the environment where the root follows a tense element, and the morphology inflects -o as a suffix, which makes the verb surface not only as a verb, but as discussed before in person agreement, also shows that this is the first person present form of the verb ("I walk").

=== Combinatorial analysis ===
Syntactic decomposition for categorization of parts of speech includes an explanation for why some verbs and nouns have a predictable relationship to their nominal counterparts and why some don't. It says that the predictable forms are denominal and that the unpredictable forms are strictly root-derived. The examples provided are of the English verbs hammer and tape. A verb such as hammer is a root-derived form, meaning that it can appear within an NP or within a VP. A denominalized verb, such as tape must first be converted from an NP because its meaning relies on the semantics of the noun.

The discussion of how categorical features are determined is still up for debate and there have been numerous other theories trying to explain how words get their meanings and surface in a category. This is an issue within categorical distinction theories that has not yet come to a conclusion which is agreed upon in the linguistic community. This is interesting because phi-features in terms of person, number and gender are concrete features that have been observed numerous times in natural languages, and are consistent patterns that are rooted in rule-based grammar.
