= Null sign =

Sign representing zero or empty set

A null sign

The null sign (∅) is a symbol often used in mathematics for denoting the empty set. The same letter in linguistics represents zero, the lack of an element. It is commonly used in phonology, morphology, and syntax.

== Encodings ==
The symbol ∅ is available at Unicode point U+2205. It can be coded in HTML as &empty;, &#8709;, or &#x2205;. In LaTeX, it can be encoded as \varnothing ($\varnothing$) or \emptyset ($\emptyset$).

== Similar letters ==
Similar letters and symbols include the following:

- Diameter sign for example in geometry, engineering and photography: U+2300 ⌀ DIAMETER SIGN
- Scandinavian letter Ø: majuscule U+00D8 Ø LATIN CAPITAL LETTER O WITH STROKE and minuscule U+00F8 ø LATIN SMALL LETTER O WITH STROKE are a part of the alphabet of Scandinavian languages. The minuscule letter is also used in the International Phonetic Alphabet (IPA) to represent the close-mid front rounded vowel.
- Greek letter Φ: majuscule U+03A6 Φ GREEK CAPITAL LETTER PHI and minuscule U+03C6 φ GREEK SMALL LETTER PHI are a part of the Greek alphabet. It sometimes take the form of U+03D5 ϕ GREEK PHI SYMBOL and is used as a sign in different fields of studies. The U+0278 ɸ LATIN SMALL LETTER PHI is used in the IPA for voiceless bilabial fricative.
- Greek letter Θ: majuscule U+0398 Θ GREEK CAPITAL LETTER THETA and minuscule U+03B8 θ GREEK SMALL LETTER THETA are a part of the Greek alphabet. The minuscule is used in the IPA for voiceless dental fricative. The capital letter sometimes are rendered as U+03F4 ϴ GREEK CAPITAL THETA SYMBOL.
- Cyrillic letter Ө: majuscule U+04E8 Ө CYRILLIC CAPITAL LETTER BARRED O and minuscule U+04E9 ө CYRILLIC SMALL LETTER BARRED O are a part of the Cyrillic script. It is used in the IPA for close-mid central rounded vowel.
- Cyrillic letter Ф: majuscule U+0424 Ф CYRILLIC CAPITAL LETTER EF and minuscule U+0444 ф CYRILLIC SMALL LETTER EF are a part of the Cyrillic script. The letter took the place of fita (U+0472 Ѳ CYRILLIC CAPITAL LETTER FITA and U+0473 ѳ CYRILLIC SMALL LETTER FITA), a letter of Early Cyrillic alphabet in modern usages.

== Use in mathematics ==
In mathematics, the null sign (∅) denotes the empty set. Note that a null set is not necessarily an empty set. Common notations for the empty set include "{}", "∅", and "$\emptyset$". The latter two symbols were introduced by the Bourbaki group (specifically André Weil) in 1939, inspired by the letter Ø in the Danish and Norwegian alphabets (and not related in any way to the Greek letter Φ).

Empty sets are used in set operations. For example:

$A=\{2,3,5,7,11\}$

$B=\{4,6,8,9\}$

$A \cap B = ?$

There are no common elements in the solution; so it should be denoted as:

$A \cap B = \varnothing$ or $A \cap B = \{ \}$

== Use in linguistics ==
In linguistics, the null sign is used to indicate the absence of an element, such as a phoneme or morpheme.

=== Morphology ===
The English language was a fusional language, this means the language makes use of inflectional changes to convey multiple grammatical meanings. Although the inflectional complexity of English has been largely reduced in the course of development, the inflectional endings can be seen in earlier forms of English, such as Early Modern English (abbreviated as EModE).

The verb endings of EModE were summarised in the table below by Roger Lass:

Verb Endings of EModE
	Present	Past
First person singular	-∅	-d
Second person singular	-st	-dst
Third person singular	-th, -s	-d
