= Open syllable lengthening =

Phonetic process

Open syllable lengthening, in linguistics, is the process by which short vowels become long in an open syllable. It occurs in many languages at a phonetic or allophonic level, and no meaningful distinction in length is made. However, as it became phonemic in many Germanic languages, it is especially significant in them, both historically and in the modern languages.

Open syllable lengthening affected the stressed syllables of all modern Germanic languages in their history to some degree. It seems to have affected the languages around a similar time, between the 12th and the 16th centuries, during the late Middle Ages. The languages differ mainly as to the specific vowels that were lengthened the specific environment but also in the result of the lengthening. There is substantial variation, and in many languages, the process has been obscured by paradigmatic levelling. Sometimes, the newly lengthened vowels merged with existing long vowels, but in other languages, they remained distinct because the older long vowels underwent changes of their own such as in Icelandic and, to a lesser degree, the continental Scandinavian languages.

The lengthening often also applied in reverse at some point by shortening long vowels in closed syllables. As a consequence of the combination of the two changes, vowel length and consonant length came to be in complementary distribution: one of the two features is no longer distinctive but is predictable from the other.

Many languages later shortened the long consonants. That had consequences for spelling, as consonant length was generally marked by doubling in the various Germanic languages, but vowel length was not. The doubled consonants then came to be used as an indicator for vowel length and, later, quality. That feature is seen in most Germanic languages today.

Some Germanic varieties such as High Alemannic German, Elfdalian and Finland Swedish dialects have no general open syllabic lengthening. It may be restricted to a few cases before sonorant consonants, as in Bernese German [ˈv̥aːrə] ('to drive') or [ˈtæːlər] ('valleys'), or it may not occur at all, as in Walser German. Consequently, the varieties feature both distinctive vowel length and distinctive consonant length.

== Continental West Germanic ==
Open syllable lengthening in the continental West Germanic languages (excluding Frisian) is theorized to have been a single process. It is first attested in Middle Dutch, where it may have already been completed during the Old Low Franconian period (prior to 1200). From there it is thought to have spread first to Low German and then to High German. A competing theory suggests that it may have arisen independently in the Upper German dialect area of High German; there is some early evidence for lengthening in Bavarian that would predate a spread from the north.

=== Dutch ===
In Dutch, the process was already underway around the 12th century, which made it one of the earliest languages to be affected. In written documents of the 13th century, long vowels in closed syllables are generally written by doubling the vowel or by adding e or i. In open syllables, only a single vowel was written regardless of whether the vowel was originally short or originally long, suggesting that length was implicit there. Early Middle Dutch still had long consonants, which closed the preceding syllable and prevented lengthening. Once the lengthening had occurred, the consonants began to lose their distinctive length, and vowel length once again became distinctive in open syllables.

The lengthened vowels did not merge with any of the older long vowels, as can be judged from evidence in texts from certain areas and the modern dialects that retain such a distinction. Instead, the lengthening produced four new long vowels (see Middle Dutch phonology). They are conventionally denoted with a macron, and the original long vowels are denoted with a circumflex. The exact phonetic nature of the two types of long vowel is unknown and probably differed by area. Differences in vowel height, backness and/or diphthongal quality may have played a role. The following table shows the changes:

Lengthened		Originally long	
Old Dutch	Middle Dutch	Middle Dutch	Old Dutch
a	ā /ɑː~ aː/	â /ɒː~ æː/	ā
e	ē /ɛː~ ɛi/	ê /eː~ eɛ/	ē
i	ē /ɛː~ ɛi/	î /iː/	ī
o	ō /ɔː/	ô /oː~ oɔ/	ō
u	ō /ɔː/	û /yː/	ū
y	ø̄	û /yː/	ū

Vowels ā and â merged early on in most dialects, but were kept distinct in the easternmost areas (Limburg, Low Rhenish), where â tended to merge with ō (that also happened in Middle Low German). Vowels ē and ō were generally kept separate from ê and ô but were eventually merged in Modern Dutch. Some dialects still retain a difference, however.

Modern Dutch orthography uses a combination of vowel and consonant doubling to indicate vowel length, a tradition that began in the 13th century. However, because consonant length is no longer contrastive, doubled consonants are purely an orthographical device to indicate vowel length. Long vowels in closed syllables are doubled, and consonants are doubled following short vowels in open syllables even when it is not etymological.

=== Low German ===
Lengthening occurred in the transition from Old Saxon to Middle Low German along the same lines as it did in Middle Dutch. Lengthened vowels remained distinct from original long vowels, which were more closed and eventually became diphthongs in most areas. Unlike in most of Middle Dutch, the Germanic umlaut had also affected long vowels. The umlauted long vowels remained distinct from the lengthened vowels. The following table shows the development:

Lengthened		Originally long	
Old Saxon	Middle Low German	Old Saxon	Middle Low German
a	ā	ā	â
e	ē	ē	ê
i	ē	ī	î
o	ō	ō	ô
u	ō	ū	û
y	ø̄	ȳ	ŷ
y	ø̄	ø̄	ø̂

Vowels â and ō were later merged.

=== High German ===
Vowel lengthening in German is generally thought to have occurred somewhat later, towards the end of the Middle Ages. As a feature, it probably spread north and south from the Netherlands and northern Germany and took a century or two to reach High German. The process itself was much the same, however, as in Dutch.

Because the process did not begin until scribal traditions were already in place, the spelling was generally not adapted to the change in length, and long vowels continued to be written as single vowels. As a result, the consonants after the vowels were taken to indicate length, but it was not always consistent. Substantial levelling also occurred in noun and verb paradigms; the short-vowel forms with no ending generally adopted, by analogy, the long vowel of the forms with an ending.

== Anglo-Frisian ==
=== English ===
Vowel lengthening in English was very similar to the process in Dutch and began only a short while later. According to one theory, vowels were lowered when lengthened, as in Dutch and Low German. However, apart from /a/, they merged with the existing long vowels.

Lengthened		Originally long
Early Middle English	Late Middle English	Early Middle English
a	aː	
e	ɛː	ɛː
i	eː	eː
	iː	iː
o	ɔː	ɔː
u	oː	oː
	uː	uː

The process was restricted in the following ways:

1. It did not occur when two or more syllables followed because of the opposing process of trisyllabic laxing.
2. It only occasionally applied to the high vowels /i/ and /u/: Old English wudu > Middle English /woːd/ > "wood"; Old English wicu > Middle English /weːk/ > "week". Most instances of /i/ and /u/ remained as such: Old English hnutu > "nut", Old English riden > "ridden".

As in Dutch, long vowels were often written doubled in closed syllables, and they were often long in open syllables. The process applied neither as consistently nor as thoroughly as in Dutch, however. Generally, only e and o were doubled. As word-final schwa began to disappear, the newly created silent e was added to the end of the words in which it was not etymologically justified to indicate vowel length.

The lengthening still survives in Modern English and accounts, for example, for the vowel difference between "staff" and the alternative plural "staves" (Middle English staf vs. stāves, with open-syllable lengthening in the latter word). The effects of open-syllable lengthening and trisyllabic laxing often led to differences in the stem vowel between singular and plural/genitive. Generally, the differences were regularised by analogy in one direction or another but not in a consistent way:

- Middle English path, pāthes > "path, paths" but Middle English whal, whāles > "whale, whales"
- Middle English crādel, cradeles > "cradle, cradles" but Middle English sādel, sadeles > "saddle, saddles"

=== Frisian ===
Open syllable lengthening occurred relatively late in West Frisian, occurring around the 14th and 15th centuries. It was different from other continental west Germanic languages in that Frisian at the time still possessed two distinctive vowels in unstressed syllables, a and e. Lengthening only occurred widely before e, while it was limited to the dialects of southwestern Friesland in the case of following a.

== North Germanic languages ==
The North Germanic languages do not have open-syllable lengthening as such, except for Danish, which follows the pattern for West Germanic languages. In old Danish, /i/, /y/, /u/, and /ɑː/ were changed to /e/, /ø/, /o/, and /ɔː/ before the lengthening.

Instead, they underwent a similar process of syllable weight neutralization. Vowels were lengthened in short syllables regardless of whether the syllable was open or not; single-syllable words were also affected. An opposing process acted to shorten long vowels in overlong syllables.

As a result, all stressed syllables came to have heavy syllable weight. The lengthening and the shortening also increased the number of phonemes, as the new sounds did not always merge with the old ones. For example, while Old Norse originally possessed short i and long í, Modern Icelandic has short and long i as well as short and long í, which depends entirely on syllable structure.

The following table shows the result of lengthening and shortening from Icelandic Old Norse to Modern Icelandic. "(ː)" indicates that length depends on syllable structure.

Originally short			Originally long		
Spelling	Icelandic Old Norse	Modern Icelandic	Spelling	Icelandic Old Norse	Modern Icelandic
a	/a/	/a(ː)/	á	/aː/	/au(ː)/
e	/e/	/ɛ(ː)/	é	/eː/	/jɛ(ː)/
i, y	/i/, /y/	/ɪ(ː)/	í, ý	/iː/, /yː/	/i(ː)/
o	/o/	/ɔ(ː)/	ó	/oː/	/ou(ː)/
u	/u/	/ʏ(ː)/	ú	/uː/	/u(ː)/
ö (ø, ǫ)	/ø/	/œ(ː)/	æ (œ)	/ɛː/	/ai(ː)/

The following table shows the outcomes for Old East Norse to Modern Swedish. They remained distinct for original /a(ː)/, /o(ː)/ and /u(ː)/, and high vowels lowered when they lengthened. Early Modern Swedish kept old short /o/ and rounded older /a:/ <å> distinct, with the former being long or short /ɞ/ or /ɔ/, that later merged with /o/ in Standard Swedish, *but is still distinct in dialects such as Värmländska and Västgötska with minimal pairs like kol/kål and gott/gått. Some dialects, like Dalecarlian along with northern and Finland Swedish varieties have only limited or no syllable lengthening.

Originally short	Originally long	Originally short	Originally long
Old East Norse		Modern Swedish	
/a/	/aː/	/a/ ~ /ɑː/	/ɔ/ ~ /oː/
	/e:/	/e/ ~ /eː/	
/i/	/iː/	/i/ /e/ ~ /eː/	/i/ ~ /iː/
/o/	/oː/	/ɔ/ ~ /oː/ */ɞ(:)/	/ʊ/ ~ /uː/
/u/	/uː/	/ɵ/ ~ /ʉː/, /ɔː/	/ɵ/ ~ /ʉː/
/y/	/yː/	/ʏ/ /œ/ ~ /øː/	/ʏ/ ~ /yː/
/ɛ/	/ɛː/	/ɛ/ ~ /ɛː/	
/ø/	/øː/	/œ/ ~ /øː/	

== Works cited ==
- de Vaan, Michiel (2017). The Dawn of Dutch: Language contact in the Western Low Countries before 1200. NOWELE Supplement Series. Vol. 30. John Benjamins. doi:10.1075/nss.30. ISBN 978-90-272-0020-4.
- Donaldson, B.C. (1983). Dutch: A Linguistic History of Holland and Belgium. Martinus Nijhoff.
- Foerste, William (1957). "Geschichte der niederdeutschen Mundarten". In Wolfgang Stammler (ed.). Deutsche Philologie im Aufriß. Vol. 1 (2nd ed.). Berlin: Erich Schmidt. pp. 1729–1898.
- Goblirsch, Kurt Gustav (2018). Gemination, Lenition, and Vowel Lengthening: On the History of Quantity in Germanic. Cambridge University Press. doi:10.1017/9781139540780. ISBN 978-1-139-54078-0.
- Goossens, Jan (1974). Historische Phonologie des Niederländischen. de Gruyter. doi:10.1515/9783111411576. ISBN 978-3-484-60035-5.
- Lahiri, Aditi; Dresher, B. Elan (1999). "Open Syllable Lengthening in West Germanic". Language. 75 (4): 678–719. doi:10.2307/417730. JSTOR 417730.
- Lasch, Agathe (1974). Mittelniederdeutsche Grammatik (2 ed.). Niemeyer. doi:10.1515/9783111393124. ISBN 978-3-484-10183-8.
- Paul, Hermann; Wiehl, Peter; Grosse, Siegfried (1998). Mittelhochdeutsche Grammatik (24 ed.). Niemeyer.
- Salmons, Joseph (2018). A History of German: What the Past Reveals about Today's Language (2 ed.). Oxford University Press.
- Seiler, Guido (2009). "Sound change or analogy? Monosyllabic lengthening in German and some of its consequences". Journal of Comparative Germanic Linguistics. 12 (3): 229–272. doi:10.1007/s10828-009-9031-y.
- Van Bree, Cor (2016). Leerboek voor de historische grammatica van het Nederlands - Deel 1: Gotische grammatica, inleiding, klankleer (2 ed.). Universitet Leiden. hdl:1887/38870.
- van Loey, Adolphe (1964). Schönfelds Historische Grammatica van het Nederlands (7 ed.). N.V. W. J. Thieme & Cie.
- Wiesinger, Peter (1983d). "Dehnung und Kürzung in den deutschen Dialekten". In Besch, Werner (ed.). Dialektologie: Ein Handbuch zur deutschen und allgemeinen Dialektforschung. Berlin, New York: De Gruyter. pp. 1088–1101. doi:10.1515/9783110203332-003.
- Zhirmunski, Viktor M. (2010). Naidich, Larissa (ed.). Deutsche Mundartkunde. Peter Lang.
