= Great Vowel Shift =

Pronunciation change in English between 1350 and 1700

Diagram of the changes in English vowels during the Great Vowel Shift

The Great Vowel Shift was a series of pronunciation changes in the vowels of the English language that took place primarily between 1400 and 1700 (the 15th century forming the transition period from Middle English to Early Modern English), beginning in southern England and having influenced effectively all dialects of English today. Through this extensive vowel shift, the pronunciation of all Middle English long vowels altered. Some consonant sounds also changed, specifically becoming silent; the term Great Vowel Shift is occasionally used to include these consonantal changes.

The standardization of English spelling began in the 15th and 16th centuries; the Great Vowel Shift is the major reason English spellings now often deviate considerably from how they represent pronunciations.

Notable early researchers of the Great Vowel Shift include Alexander J. Ellis, in On Early English Pronunciation, with Especial Reference to Shakespeare and Chaucer (1869–1889); Henry Sweet, in A History of English Sounds (1874, revised edition 1888); Karl Luick from Vienna, in a series of works dating from 1892 and Untersuchungen zur englischen Lautgeschichte (1896); and Otto Jespersen (a Danish linguist and Anglicist) who first produced a diagram for it and who in Part I (1909) of A Modern English Grammar on Historical Principles coined the term. (Note: Jespersen writes "the great vowel-shift": with a hyphen, and not capitalized. Jespersen, Otto (1961) [1909]. A Modern English Grammar on Historical Principles. Part 1: Sounds and Spellings. London: George Allen & Unwin. pp. 231–247.)

== Overall changes ==
The main difference between the pronunciation of Middle English in the year 1400 and Modern English (Received Pronunciation) is in the value of the long vowels.

Long vowels in Middle English had "continental" values, much like those in Italian and Standard German; in standard Modern English, they have entirely different pronunciations. The differing pronunciations of English vowel letters do not stem from the Great Shift as such but rather because English spelling did not adapt to the changes.

German had undergone vowel changes quite similar to the Great Shift slightly earlier. Still, the spelling was changed accordingly (e.g., Middle High German bīzen → modern German beißen "to bite").

Word	Vowel pronunciation	
Word	Late Middle English before the GVS	Modern English after the GVS
bite	[iː]	[aɪ]
meet	[eː]	[iː]
meat	[ɛː]	[iː]
serene	[ɛː]	[iː]
mate	[aː]	[eɪ]
out	[uː]	[aʊ]
boot	[oː]	[uː]
boat	[ɔː]	[oʊ]
stone	[ɔː]	[oʊ]

Word	Diphthong pronunciation	
Word	Late Middle English before the GVS	Modern English after the GVS
day	[æɪ]	[eɪ]
they	[æɪ]	[eɪ]
boy	[ɔɪ]	[ɔɪ]
point	[ʊɪ]	[ɔɪ]
law	[ɑʊ]	[ɔː]
knew	[eʊ]	[juː]
dew	[ɛʊ]	[juː]
know	[ɔʊ]	[oʊ]

=== Timeline ===
This timeline uses representative words to show the main vowel changes between late Middle English in the year 1400 and Received Pronunciation in the mid-20th century. (Note: Geoff Lindsey has criticised some aspects of this diagram, specifically the use of Gimson's symbols at the top.) The Great Vowel Shift occurred in the lower half of the table, between 1400 and 1600–1700, so the changes after 1700 are not considered part of it. Pronunciation is given in the International Phonetic Alphabet:

== Details ==
=== Middle English vowel system ===
Before the Great Vowel Shift, Middle English in Southern England had seven long vowels, /iː eː ɛː aː ɔː oː uː/. The vowels occurred in, for example, the words mite, meet, meat, mate, boat, boot, and bout, respectively.

Southern Middle English vowel system
	front	back
close	/iː/: mite	/uː/: bout
close-mid	/eː/: meet	/oː/: boot
open-mid	/ɛː/: meat	/ɔː/: boat
open	/aː/: mate	—

The words had very different pronunciations in Middle English from those in Modern English:

- Long i in mite was pronounced as /iː/, so Middle English mite sounded similar to Modern English meet.
- Long e in meet was pronounced as /eː/, so Middle English meet sounded similar to modern Australian English met but pronounced longer.
- Long a in mate was pronounced as /aː/, with a vowel similar to the broad a of ma.
- Long o in boot was pronounced as /oː/, so Middle English boot sounded similar to modern Southern England, Australian and New Zealand English bought.

In addition, Middle English had:

- Long /ɛː/ in meat, like Received Pronunciation air, or modern short e in met but pronounced longer.
- Long /ɔː/ in boat, with a vowel similar to aw in modern Northern England English law, or like modern Southern England, Australian and New Zealand English bot but pronounced longer.
- Long /uː/ in bout, similar to Modern English boot.

=== Changes ===
After around 1300, the long vowels of Middle English began changing in pronunciation as follows:

- Diphthongisation – The two close vowels, /iː uː/, became diphthongs (vowel breaking).
- Vowel raising – The other five, /eː ɛː aː ɔː oː/, underwent an increase in tongue height (raising).

These changes occurred over several centuries and can be divided into two phases. The first phase affected the close vowels /iː uː/ and the close-mid vowels /eː oː/: /eː oː/ were raised to /iː uː/, and /iː uː/ became the diphthongs /ei ou/ or /əi əu/. The second phase affected the open vowel /aː/ and the open-mid vowels /ɛː ɔː/: /aː ɛː ɔː/ were raised, in most cases changing to /eː iː oː/.

The Great Vowel Shift changed vowels without merger, so Middle English before the vowel shift had the same number of vowel phonemes as early modern English after the vowel shift.

After the Great Vowel Shift, some vowel phonemes began merging. Immediately after the Great Vowel Shift, the vowels of meet and meat were different, but they are merged in Modern English, and both words are pronounced as /miːt/.

However, during the 16th and the 17th centuries, there were many different mergers, and some mergers can be seen in individual Modern English words like great, which is pronounced with the vowel /eɪ/ as in mate rather than the vowel /iː/ as in meat.

This is a simplified picture of the changes that happened between late Middle English (late ME), Early Modern English (EModE), and today's English (ModE). Pronunciations in 1400, 1500, 1600, and 1900 are shown. To hear recordings of the sounds, click the phonetic symbols.

Word	Vowel pronunciation				Sound file
Word	late ME	EModE		ModE	Sound file
Word	1400	1500	1600	by 1900	Sound file
bite	/iː/	/ei/	/ɛi/	/aɪ/	
out	/uː/	/ou/	/ɔu/	/aʊ/	
meet	/eː/	/iː/			
boot	/oː/	/uː/			
meat	/ɛː/		/eː/	/iː/	
boat	/ɔː/		/oː/	/oʊ/	
mate	/aː/	/æː/	/ɛː/	/eɪ/	

Before labial consonants and also after /j/, /uː/ did not shift, and /uː/ remains as in soup.

=== First phase ===
The first phase of the Great Vowel Shift affected the Middle English close-mid vowels /eː oː/, as in beet and boot, and the close vowels /iː uː/, as in bite and out. The close vowels /iː uː/ became diphthongs and the close-mid vowels /eː oː/ became close /iː uː/. The first phase was completed in 1500, meaning that by that time, words like beet and boot had lost their Middle English pronunciation and were pronounced with the same vowels as in Modern English. The words bite and out were pronounced with diphthongs, but not the same diphthongs as in Modern English.

First phase of the Great Vowel Shift
Word	Vowel pronunciation	
Word	1400	1550
bite	/iː/	/ɛi/
meet	/eː/	/iː/
out	/uː/	/ɔu/
boot	/oː/	/uː/

Scholars agree that the Middle English close vowels /iː uː/ became diphthongs around 1500, but disagree about what diphthongs they changed to. According to Lass, the words bite and out after diphthongisation were pronounced as /beit/ and /out/, similar to American English bait /beɪt/ and oat /oʊt/. Later, the diphthongs /ei ou/ shifted to /ɛi ɔu/, then /əi əu/, and finally to Modern English /aɪ aʊ/. This sequence of events is supported by the testimony of orthoepists before Richard Hodges in 1644.

However, many scholars such as Dobson (1968), Kökeritz (1953), and Cercignani (1981) argue for theoretical reasons that, contrary to what 16th-century witnesses report, the vowels /iː uː/ were immediately centralised and lowered to /əi əu/. (Note: Centralizing to /ɨi ɨu/ and then lowering to /əi əu/ argued by Stockwell (1961).)

Evidence from Northern English and Scots (see below) suggests that the close-mid vowels /eː oː/ were the first to shift. As the Middle English vowels /eː oː/ were raised towards /iː uː/, they forced the original Middle English /iː uː/ out of place and caused them to become diphthongs /ei ou/. This type of sound change, in which one vowel's pronunciation shifts so that it is pronounced like a second vowel, and the second vowel is forced to change its pronunciation, is called a push chain.

However, according to professor Jürgen Handke, for some time, there was a phonetic split between words with the vowel /iː/ and the diphthong /əi/, in words where the Middle English /iː/ shifted to the Modern English /aɪ/. For an example, high was pronounced with the vowel /iː/, and like and my were pronounced with the diphthong /əi/. Therefore, for logical reasons, the close vowels /iː uː/ could have diphthongised before the close-mid vowels /eː oː/ raised. Otherwise, high would probably rhyme with thee rather than my. This type of chain is called a drag chain.

=== Second phase ===
The second phase of the Great Vowel Shift affected the Middle English open vowel /aː/, as in mate, and the Middle English open-mid vowels /ɛː ɔː/, as in meat and boat. Around 1550, Middle English /aː/ was raised to /æː/. Then, after 1600, the new /æː/ was raised to /ɛː/, with the Middle English open-mid vowels /ɛː ɔː/ raised to close-mid /eː oː/.

Second phase of the Great Vowel Shift
Word	Vowel pronunciation		
Word	1400	1550	1640
meat	/ɛː/	/ɛː/	/eː/
mate	/aː/	/aː/, /æː/	/ɛː/
boat	/ɔː/	/ɔː/	/oː/

=== Later mergers ===
During the first and the second phases of the Great Vowel Shift, long vowels were shifted without merging with other vowels, but after the second phase, several vowels merged. The later changes also involved the Middle English diphthong /ɛj/, as in day, which often (but not always, see the pane-pain merger) monophthongised to /ɛː/, and merged with Middle English /aː/ as in mate or /ɛː/ as in meat.

During the 16th and 17th centuries, several different pronunciation variants existed among different parts of the population for words like meet, meat, mate, and day. Different pairs or trios of words were merged in pronunciation in each pronunciation variant. Four different pronunciation variants are shown in the table below. The fourth pronunciation variant gave rise to Modern English pronunciation. In Modern English, meet and meat are merged in pronunciation and both have the vowel /iː/, and mate and day are merged with the diphthong /eɪ/, which developed from the 16th-century long vowel /eː/.

Meet–meat mergers
Word	Middle English	1500s pronunciation variants			
Word	Middle English	1	2	3	4
meet	/eː/	/iː/	/iː/	/iː/	/iː/
meat	/ɛː/	/ɛː/	/eː/	/eː/	/iː/
day	/ɛj/	/ɛː/	/eː/	/ɛː/	/eː/
mate	/aː/	/æː/	/eː/	/ɛː/	/eː/

Modern English typically has the meet–meat merger: both meet and meat are pronounced with the vowel /iː/. Words like great and steak, however, have merged with mate and are pronounced with the vowel /eɪ/, which developed from the /eː/ shown in the table above. Before historic /r/ some of these vowels merged with /ə/, /ɛ/, /ɪ/ and respectively /ʊ/.

== Northern English and Scots ==
The Great Vowel Shift affected other dialects and the standard English of southern England but in different ways. In Northern England, the shift did not operate on the long back vowels because they had undergone an earlier shift. Similarly, the dialect in Scotland had a different vowel system before the Great Vowel Shift, as /oː/ had shifted to /øː/ in Early Scots. In the Scots equivalent of the Great Vowel Shift, the long vowels /iː/, /eː/ and /aː/ shifted to /ei/, /iː/ and /eː/ by the Middle Scots period and /uː/ remained unaffected.

The first step in the Great Vowel Shift in Northern and Southern English is shown in the table below. The Northern English developments of Middle English /iː, eː/ and /oː, uː/ were different from Southern English. In particular, the Northern English vowels /iː/ in bite, /eː/ in feet, and /oː/ in boot shifted, while the vowel /uː/ in house did not. These developments below fall under the label "older" to refer to Scots and a more conservative and increasingly rural Northern sound, while "younger" refers to a more mainstream Northern sound largely emerging just since the twentieth century.

Word	Vowel			
Word	Middle English	Modern English		
Word	Middle English	Scots/ Northern (older)	Northern (younger)	Southern
bite	/iː/	/ɛj/	/aj/	/ɑj/
feet	/eː/	/iː/	/iː/	/ɪj/
house	/uː/	/uː/	/ɐw/~/aw/	/aw/
boot	/oː/	/iː/	/yː/~/uː/	/ʉw/

The vowel systems of Northern and Southern Middle English immediately before the Great Vowel Shift were different in one way. In Northern Middle English, the back close-mid vowel /oː/ in boot had already shifted to front /øː/ (a sound change known as fronting), like the long ö in German hören [ˈhøːʁən] "hear". Thus, Southern English had a back close-mid vowel /oː/, but Northern English did not:

Southern Middle English vowel system
	front	back
close	iː	uː
close-mid	eː	oː
open-mid	ɛː	ɔː
open	aː	—

Northern Middle English vowel system
	front	back
close	iː	uː
close-mid	eː, øː	—
open-mid	ɛː	ɔː
open	aː	—

In Northern and Southern English, the first step of the Great Vowel Shift raised the close-mid vowels to become close. Northern Middle English had two close-mid vowels – /eː/ in feet and /øː/ in boot – which were raised to /iː/ and /yː/. Later on, Northern English /yː/ changed to /iː/ in many dialects (though not in all, see Phonological history of Scots § Vowel 7), so that boot has the same vowel as feet. Southern Middle English had two close-mid vowels – /eː/ in feet and /oː/ in boot – which were raised to /iː/ and /uː/.

In Southern English, the close vowels /iː/ in bite and /uː/ in house shifted to become diphthongs, but in Northern English, /iː/ in bite shifted but /uː/ in house did not.

If the vowel systems at the time of the Great Vowel Shift caused the difference between the Northern and Southern vowel shifts, /uː/ did not shift because there was no back mid vowel /oː/ in Northern English. In Southern English, shifting of /oː/ to /uː/ could have caused diphthongisation of original /uː/, but because Northern English had no back close-mid vowel /oː/ to shift, the back close vowel /uː/ did not diphthongise.

== See also ==
- Canaanite Shift
- "The Chaos"—a poem using the irregularity of English spelling and pronunciation
- Grimm's law
- High German consonant shift
- History of English
- Ingvaeonic nasal spirant law
- Middle English creole hypothesis
- Phonological history of English vowels
- Slavic palatalisation

== Sources ==
=== General and cited sources ===
- Baugh, Alfred C.; Cable, Thomas (1993). A History of the English Language (4th ed.). Englewood Cliffs, New Jersey: Prentice-Hall.
- Cable, Thomas (1983). A Companion to Baugh & Cable's History of the English Language. Englewood Cliffs, New Jersey: Prentice-Hall.
- Cercignani, Fausto (1981). Shakespeare's Works and Elizabethan Pronunciation. Oxford: Clarendon Press.
- Dillon, George L. "American English vowels". Archived from the original on 5 July 2013. Studying Phonetics on the Net.
- Dobson, E. J. (1968). English Pronunciation 1500–1700 (2 vols) (2nd ed.). Oxford: Clarendon Press. (See vol. 2, 594–713 for discussion of long stressed vowels)
- Freeborn, Dennis (1992). From Old English to Standard English: A Course Book in Language Variation Across Time. Ottawa, Canada: University of Ottawa Press.
- Görlach, Manfred (1991). Introduction to Early Modern English. Cambridge University Press.
- Kökeritz, Helge (1953). Shakespeare's Pronunciation. New Haven: Yale University Press.
- Lass, Roger (2000). "Chapter 3: Phonology and Morphology". In Lass, Roger (ed.). The Cambridge History of the English Language, Volume III: 1476–1776. Cambridge University Press. pp. 56–186.
- Millward, Celia (1996). A Biography of the English Language (2nd ed.). Fort Worth: Harcourt Brace.
- Pyles, Thomas; Algeo, John (1993). The Origins and Development of the English Language (4th ed.). Orlando, FL: Harcourt Brace & Co.
- Rogers, William 'Bill'. "A Simplified History of the Phonemes of English". Furman. Archived from the original on 2002-08-03.
