= Lexical diffusion =

Theory of sound changes in linguistics

Lexical diffusion is the hypothesis that a sound change is an abrupt change that spreads gradually across the words in a language to which it is applicable. It contrasts with the Neogrammarian view that a sound change results from phonetically-conditioned articulatory drift acting uniformly on all applicable words, which implies that sound changes are regular, with exceptions attributed to analogy and dialect borrowing.

Similar views were expressed by Romance dialectologists in the late 19th century but were reformulated and renamed by William Wang and coworkers studying varieties of Chinese in the 1960s and the 1970s. William Labov found evidence for both processes but argued that they operate at different levels.

== Neogrammarian viewpoint ==
Schematic diagram of a uniform sound change, a gradual change that applies equally to all words

A key assumption of historical linguistics is that sound change is regular. The principle was summarized by the Neogrammarians in the late 19th century with the quote "sound laws suffer no exceptions" and forms the basis of the comparative method of reconstruction and the tree model of linguistic evolution. Inspired by the Uniformitarian Principle of geology, Neogrammarians such as Hermann Paul described regularity as a consequence of the operation of sound change as an imperceptible articulatory drift conditioned by the phonetic environment.

Leonard Bloomfield later summarized this view:

Sound change is merely a change in the speaker's manner of producing phonemes and accordingly affects a phoneme at every occurrence, regardless of the nature of any particular linguistic form in which the phoneme happens to occur.

He summarized the mechanism as "phonemes change". Despite the unequivocal form in which these slogans are often quoted, the Neogrammarians admitted two exceptions to regular sound change: analogy and dialect borrowing.

== Dialectologists ==
Isoglosses of the vowel in the word sun in England

Uniform sound change was first challenged by Hugo Schuchardt, a dialectologist of Romance languages, who wrote in his criticism of the Neogrammarians:

Rarely-used words lag behind; very frequently used ones rush ahead. Exceptions to the sound laws are thus formed on both sides.

Dialectologists studying the Romance languages found many apparent exceptions to uniformity, as reflected in their motto, chaque mot a son histoire ('every word has its own history'). This is commonly ascribed to Jules Gilliéron but also originated with Schuchardt.

An example of this phenomenon is the shortening of English 'u' (i.e. the foot-strut split). This sound change results in two different vowels in words such as cut and put. When the isogloss defining this feature in England is examined closely, it emerges that individual words are moving from /ʊ/ to /ʌ/ over time. It can also be seen that individual speakers fluctuate in their own pronunciation of the same words.

Other arguments against regular, gradual sound change have also been given. For instance, some sound changes, such as metathesis or haplology, are inherently discontinuous and hence incompatible with gradual, imperceptible change.

== Wang's reformulation ==
Schematic diagram of lexical diffusion, in which an abrupt change spreads through the lexicon

In 1962, Peking University published Hanyu Fangyin Zihui, containing transcriptions of 2444 morphemes in 17 modern varieties of Chinese. The DOC project at the University of California, Berkeley, headed by William Wang, attempted to apply the comparative method to a computerized form of this data. However, the Chinese data revealed pervasive irregularities.

For example, Middle Chinese words in the third tone class (the "departing" tone) with voiced initials have two forms in the modern Teochew dialect, but no phonetic factor has been found to condition the split. Cheng and Wang list 12 pairs of words that were homophonous in Middle Chinese but have different modern pronunciations. Similar examples were found on other Chinese varieties and other language families. Wang accounted for such irregularities by positing a form of lexical diffusion:

We hold that words change their pronunciations by discrete, perceptible increments (i.e. phonetically abrupt), but severally at a time (i.e. lexically gradual) rather than always in a homogeneous block.

In his view, a sound change would be regular if the change had completed its progress through the lexicon, but irregularity would be seen if the change were still incomplete or if it were interrupted by another change.

Other linguists responded that the explanation of the irregularities should be found in dialect mixture. Indeed, Wang and Lien discovered that the Teochew phenomenon was the result of borrowing from the local literary reading tradition. They present a revised model that distinguishes between the initial "actuation" of a sound change by language contact or internal factors, and its "implementation" by lexical diffusion.

== Evaluation ==
Labov found evidence for both processes, but argued that they operate at different levels:

- Regular sound change occurs when the phonetic realization of a phoneme varies gradually and continuously. The process affects all words containing the phoneme uniformly. Examples include vowel shifts and diphthongization, weakening of glides and unstressed vowels, vocalization of liquids, and changes in the manner of articulation of consonants.
- Lexical diffusion represents a change in the phonemes in a word (substitution, metathesis, elision, epenthesis). It is abrupt and applies to words selected by lexical, grammatical or social criteria.

Paul Kiparsky argues that under a proper definition of analogy as optimization, lexical diffusion is a non-proportional type of analogy similar to leveling, rather than a type of sound change.

== See also ==
- Diachronic linguistics
- Comparative method
