= Consonant shift =

A consonant shift is a type of sound change in a language and may refer to:

- Grimm's law, also known as the first Germanic sound Shift
- High German consonant shift or second Germanic consonant shift

== See also ==
- Vowel shift
