= Morphological leveling =

Generalization of inflection

In linguistics, morphological leveling or paradigm leveling is the generalization of an inflection across a linguistic paradigm, a group of forms with the same stem in which each form corresponds in usage to different syntactic environments, or between words. The result of such leveling is a paradigm that is less varied, having fewer forms.

When a language becomes less synthetic, it is often a matter of morphological leveling. An example is the conjugation of English verbs, which has become almost unchanging today (see also null morpheme), thus contrasting sharply, for example, with Latin, in which one verb has dozens of forms, each one expressing a different tense, aspect, mood, voice, person, and number. For instance, English sing has only two forms in the present tense (I/you/we/they sing and he/she sings), but its Latin equivalent cantāre has six: one for each combination of person and number.

== Types ==
There are two types of paradigm leveling.

=== Paradigm internal leveling ===
In this case, the paradigm leveling occurs within the same paradigm. In this way, one form of a word takes on the characteristic(s) of another form within its own paradigm.

=== Trans-paradigmatic leveling ===
In trans-paradigmatic leveling, the process occurs between two forms originating from two separate paradigms. This means that a form from one paradigm begins to resemble the form of another from a separate paradigm.

== Applications ==
=== to be leveling ===
In this application of leveling, the verb to be becomes leveled to a select few forms used in the language. To be leveling is considered the extension by analogy of the (more frequent) third-person singular form is to other persons, such as I is and they is. In English, this would be the use of I is for I am and they is for they are. This leveling extends to the past tense for was. In dialects that use this leveling, examples would be "They was late" and "We was fixing it".

=== Ablaut leveling ===
An ablaut is the vowel changes within a single root or its relations that is common to many Indo-European languages. Within the terms of paradigm leveling, ablaut leveling occurs when the variation in the vowels used to differentiate between forms weakens, or lessens, to mimic a similar form.

=== Prosodic paradigm leveling (PPL) ===
Prosody deals with the pitch, length, and loudness of the segments of words. In prosodic paradigm leveling (PPL), the prosody of the forms of a word will be leveled so that the prosodic distinction between the words is minor, or they are prosodically similar. This application of leveling occurs in two steps. The first being when a new form begins to gain use alongside an older version of the word. The second step is when the older form falls out of use and the newer one becomes the primary form of the word.

== In languages ==
=== English ===
Because of the many dialects in English, there are multiple ways morphological leveling affects the language.

==== to be leveling ====
African American Vernacular English (AAVE) and Appalachian English both exhibit the to be leveling mentioned above.

In AAVE, this kind of leveling can be used to change the semantics of a sentence. When a speaker of this dialect says a phrase like, "I be working when they call," it does not mean the same as "I am working when they call." It means that the speaker is usually working when they receive the phone call. Thus, the leveling of the verb is used to show a recurring event instead of the typical immediate happening of the verb.

In more general terms of Appalachian English, speakers will use the past tense form of to be instead of using the other conjugations of the verb. Thus, sentences like "We was talking" and "They was making a mess" become common in the language. They also make use of a contracted form of the verb was. These sentences look like "We's out last night." This contracted form differs from the contracted is form because of the decidedly past tense context of the sentence.

==== Ablaut leveling ====
An example of ablaut leveling would be the reanalysis of English strong verbs as weak verbs, such as bode becoming bided and swoll becoming swelled. The original strong forms of these and most other leveled verbs are readily understood by modern English speakers but are seldom used. Another example is how for all but a few nouns the original English plural suffixes stemming from the Old English weak declension have been replaced by one general plural marker; as late as the 16th century, shoon was still in use as the plural form of shoe, but in contemporary English the only acceptable form is shoes, using the general plural marker -s.

==== PPL ====
Historically, English has undergone a few changes in relation to prosodic paradigm leveling. For example, the word he'd in Australian English has experienced an internal leveling in terms of vowels. The original word was pronounced /hid/ (in IPA) in the same way as the word "heed" is pronounced in American English. However, it experienced influence from the weaker form of the word, /hɪd/. Thus, the primary pronunciation of the word became /hɪd/. Another example of this would be the word than. The word was originally pronounced /ðæːn/. This leveling occurred in terms of trans-paradigmatic leveling. The change in the word stemmed from paradigms like that (/ðæt) and have (/hæv/), from which than dropped the lengthening of the vowel to become /ðæn/.

=== Germanic languages ===
In Germanic Languages, such as Swedish, Dutch and German, ablaut leveling occurs in relation to strong verbs. In the case of Swedish, the preterite will have a distinct vowel pattern in comparison to the past participle, specifically the preterite. An example of this would be the verb meaning to write, which is conjugated below:

- Infinitive/Present: skriva
- Preterite: skrev
- Past Participle: skrivit

The vowels for the preterite singular and past participle are "e" and "i", respectively. This follows the pattern mentioned above of Swedish keeping the two tenses separate. The leveling comes in with the fact that the other tenses match one or the other of the tenses. In this case, the infinitive/present and preterite plural tenses follow the past participle and use the vowel "i".

German and Dutch follow a different pattern, in that the vowels of the preterite singular and past participle are kept the same. However, this is only the favored pattern and certain verbs do deviate from this.

	Dutch		German	
	to offer	to steal	to offer	to find
Infinitive/Present	bieden	stelen	bieten	finden
Preterite Singular	bood	stal	bot	fand
Preterite Plural	boden	stalen	boten	fanden
Past Participle	geboden	gestolen	geboten	gefunden

In the chart above, both the Dutch and German versions of the verb to offer keep the vowel of the preterite singular the same as the past participle. However, in the German verb to find and the Dutch verb to steal each have a different vowel used in the preterite singular and past participle.

== See also ==
- Lexical diffusion
- Realizational morphology
