= Onbin =

Early Middle Japanese euphonic sound changes

Onbin (Japanese onbin (音便) "euphony") is a set of sound changes that occurred in Early Middle Japanese around the end of the eighth century to the beginning of the tenth century, first attested in written texts of the Heian period. Onbin changes affected certain consonant-vowel sequences in non-word-initial position, causing them to become replaced with either a single vowel sound (as in oite, from earlier /okite/) or a single consonant sound (as in shinde, from earlier /sinite/). (In some cases, this also caused a change in the pronunciation of the preceding vowel or following consonant, as in the development of original /te/ to /de/ in shinde.) Onbin played a role in diversifying the syllable structure of native Japanese words by creating heavy syllables that ended in two vowels or in a vowel followed by a consonant.

Historical onbin changes did not occur systematically, and some sequences could yield multiple outcomes. The non-deterministic nature of the historical sound changes is exemplified by doublets showing different outcomes of the same original form, such as komichi (without onbin) versus kōji (with u-onbin) from original /komiti/, or akindo (with N-onbin) versus akyūdo (with u-onbin) from original /akibito/. However, some onbin changes have come to be grammaticalized in the conjugation of Japanese verbs: as a result, certain verbs systematically display an "onbin stem" before certain suffixes in standard modern Japanese. The formation of these onbin stems varies between dialects.

== Sound changes ==
The outcomes of onbin changes were bound moraic phonemes pronounced in the same syllable as the preceding vowel. Four distinct outcomes can be identified based on modern Japanese kana spellings: the two high vowels /i u/ and the two moraic consonants /N Q/:

- i-onbin (イ音便), currently spelled as い in hiragana and イ in katakana (romanized as i)
- u-onbin (ウ音便), currently spelled as う in hiragana and ウ in katakana (forms long vowels romanized as ō or ū)
- hatsuonbin (撥音便) or N-onbin, currently spelled as ん in hiragana and ン in katakana (romanized as syllable-final n)
- sokuonbin (促音便) or Q-onbin, currently spelled as っ in hiragana and ッ in katakana (romanized as consonant doubling)

Frellesvig (2010) divides i-onbin and u-onbin into two categories based on whether they were originally nasalized, and so recognizes six possible outcomes of onbin in the Early Middle Japanese period: /i u ĩ ũ N Q/.

The core set of onbin changes affected non-word-initial syllables that contained the consonants /p k b ɡ m n/ followed by /i u/. (In this context, /p/ represents a consonant phoneme derived from Proto-Japonic *p: it was some kind of bilabial consonant in Early Middle Japanese, although its exact pronunciation is debated. The syllables transcribed here as /pa pi pu pe po/ are sometimes alternatively romanized as "fa fi fu fe fo" or "ha hi fu he ho": the use of "h" is anachronistic in terms of Early Middle Japanese pronunciation, but corresponds to the modern pronunciation of the kana that were used to spell these syllables in historical kana orthography, before Japanese script reform.) Some onbin changes could affect word-final syllables, such as the change of /ki/ to /i/ (as in /kisaki/ to /kisai/ 'empress') or /ku/ to /u/ (as in /kaku/ to /kau/ 'in this way'), and occasionally /nu/ to /N/, or /mi mu/ to /N/ or /ũ/ (as in /asomi/ to /asoN/ 'courtier'). In contrast, onbin changes involving /bi bu ɡi ɡu/ seem to be attested only in the middle of words.

These core changes can be summarized as follows:

Core onbin changes
Source	Outcome (modern hiragana/katakana)		Examples		
Source	vowel	moraic consonant	source word	vowel	moraic consonant
pi pu	u (う/ウ)	Q (っ/ッ)	nipi₁ + ta taputo₁-	niuta tauto-	nitta tatto-
ki	i (い/イ)		yoki₁	yoi	
ku	u (う/ウ)		takume₂	taume	
bi	ũ > u (う/ウ)	N (ん/ン)	aki₁ + bi₁to₂	akiũdo	akindo
bu	ũ > u (う/ウ)		*sabusabu-si	saũzaũ-(si)-	
gi	ĩ > i (い/イ)		tugi₁te	tuĩde	
gu	ũ > u (う/ウ)	N (ん/ン)	kagupasi	kaũbasi	kanbasi
mi mu	ũ > u (う/ウ)	N (ん/ン)	ko₁ + mi₁ti pi₁ + muka(si)	koũdi piũga	kondi pingasi
ni nu		N (ん/ン)	sinite kinu + kaki		sinde kingai

Subscript numbers distinguish syllables that were different in Old Japanese, as indicated by man'yōgana, but that merged in the transition to Early Middle Japanese. Frellesvig (2010) considers it likely that onbin changes affected only /pi₁ ki₁ mi₁ bi₁ gi₁/ and not /pi₂ ki₂ mi₂ bi₂ gi₂/ (and so took place before their merger), whereas Unger (1997) disagrees. Since syllables with /i₂/ were less frequent, the relevant evidence is limited, and there is a possible case of /ki₂/ > /i/ in the word tsuitachi (ついたち, first day of the month), normally derived from Old Japanese tuki₂ "moon, month": Frellesvig argues this could be a folk etymology.

=== Additional changes ===
When the consonant in the affected sequence was either nasal /m n/ or prenasalized /b g/, onbin produced a nasal output: either a nasalized high vowel /ĩ, ũ/ or a moraic nasal consonant /N/. These nasal sounds caused following /p t k s/ to be replaced with their prenasalized counterparts, /b d g z/. By Late Middle Japanese, the nasalized vowels /ĩ, ũ/ had merged with /i, u/, and the change of /p t k s/ to /b d g z/ after a nasal sound ceased to apply as an automatic process, although it had lasting effects on the form of some inflectional morphemes and lexicalized compound words.

During Late Middle Japanese, vowel sequences ending in /u/ (including that derived from earlier /ũ/) fused into long vowels (which can be phonologically analyzed as sequences of two identical vowel phonemes in one syllable). If the first vowel was originally /i/ or /e/, the resulting long vowel was preceded by a palatal glide /j/. This produced the following outcomes:

Fusion of vowel + U
late Early Middle Japanese	Late Middle Japanese	Modern Japanese
/iu/	/juu/	/juu/
/eu/	/joo/	/joo/
/au/	/ɔɔ/	/oo/
/ou/	/oo/	/oo/

Because of this vowel fusion, words with u-onbin, such as shirōto (しろうと, amateur), do not always contain the vowel phoneme /u/ in modern Japanese, although they are still spelled with the kana う/ウ (u) because of a convention of spelling long [oː] non-phonetically in this context.

== In verbs and adjectives ==
=== Verb stems ===
As a result of onbin changes, consonant-stem verbs developed variant "onbin stems" used before certain suffixes (in modern Japanese, the past -ta, gerund -te, conditional -tara, and representative -tari). Consonant-stem verbs are those that can be analyzed as having underlying stems that end in a consonant (in modern Japanese, any of /w t k b ɡ m n r s/): these verbs take the suffix -u in the dictionary form, in contrast to vowel-stem verbs, which have stems that end in either /e/ or /i/ and take the suffix -ru in the dictionary form. In Japanese grammatical terminology, consonant-stem verbs are called five-grade (五段, godan) verbs, because their inflected forms make use of the five kana that represent the stem-final consonant plus each of the five Japanese vowels (/a i u e o/). Verbs with stems ending in /w/ show an additional complication: stem-final /w/ is deleted before suffixes that start with /i u e o/, since Japanese phonotactics only allow /w/ to occur before the vowel /a/. In terms of historical development, verb stems that end in /w/ originally ended in the consonant *p.

The onbin stem developed from the Early Middle Japanese infinitive (ren'yōkei) form, which ended in /i/. When the infinitive form of a consonant-stem verb ended in one of the syllables /pi ki bi ɡi mi ni/, it could undergo the onbin sound changes described above. In addition, it came to be possible for /ri ti si/ to undergo analogous changes in this context: thus, /ri ti/ could become /Q/ (as in /torite/ > /toQte/, /motite/ > /moQte/) and /si/ could become /i/ (as in /idasite/ > /idaite/). Frellesvig (1995) argues that verbs with stems ending in /r t s/ developed onbin stems purely as a result of the morphological process of analogy, rather than as a result of the same phonetic processes as the other onbin changes.

In modern Standard Japanese, the form of a verb's onbin stem can typically be predicted from the underlying stem-final consonant: /w r t/ give /Q/, /b m n/ give /N/ (with voicing of the following /t/ to /d/ in the suffix), /k/ gives /i/, and /ɡ/ gives /i/ (with voicing of the following /t/ to /d/ in the suffix). Verbs with underlying stems ending in /s/ do not show onbin in contemporary standard speech, but instead use /si/ (-shi-) before the relevant suffixes.

Examples of grammatical onbin in verb stems
stem consonant	onbin type	Example verb forms		
stem consonant	onbin type	Dictionary	Negative	Gerundive
/w/ (original p)	/Q/ -t-t-	morau	moraw-anai	morat-te
/r/	/Q/ -t-t-	hasiru	hasir-anai	hasit-te
/t/	/Q/ -t-t-	motsu	mot-anai	mot-te
/b/	/N/ -n-d-	asobu	asob-anai	ason-de
/m/	/N/ -n-d-	nomu	nom-anai	non-de
/n/^{[a]}	/N/ -n-d-	shinu	shin-anai	shin-de
/k/	/i/ -i-t-	kaku	kak-anai	kai-te
/ɡ/	/i/ -i-d-	oyogu	oyog-anai	oyoi-de

^{[a]} shinu (死ぬ, to die) is the only n-stem verb in modern Japanese.

A few verbs have an exceptionally formed onbin stem. For example:

- the verb iku (行く, to go) (stem ik-) has an onbin stem in /Q/, e.g. itta (行った), rather than the expected /i/.
- the verbs tou (問う, to ask) and kou (請う, to request) (stems tow-, kow-, originally /top/-, /kop/-) have u-onbin stems, e.g. tōta (問うた), kōta (請うた), rather than the expected /Q/.
- the honorific verbs irassharu (いらっしゃる, to go; to be), kudasaru (くださる, to give), nasaru (なさる, to do), ossharu (おっしゃる, to say), and gozaru (ござる, to exist; to be) all exhibit an i-onbin stem prior to the polite auxiliary verb masu (ます), e.g. irasshaimasu (いらっしゃいます), kudasaimasu (くださいます), etc., rather than the expected non-onbin form /ri/. These verbs have the expected /Q/ onbin forms before suffixes -ta, -te, -tara, -tari.

Dialects show some differences in the formation of onbin stems. Some dialects regularly use u-onbin (with fusion of /iu eu au ou/ to /juu joo oo oo/) for verb with underlying stems that end in /w/ (where standard Japanese has Q-onbin) or verbs with underlying stems that end in /m b/ (where standard Japanese has N-onbin).

- Use of u-onbin for verbs with stems that end in /w/ (original /p/) is a feature of dialects spoken in western regions, such as Kansai (including Kyoto) and Kyushu. For example, in the Kyoto dialect the verb kau (to buy) (stem kaw-) has the past form kōta, in contrast to standard Japanese katta. The 17th-century Arte da Lingoa de Iapam by João Rodrigues identified the use of u-onbin in this context as a feature of the Japanese spoken in Kyoto, in contrast to the use of Q in the Kanto dialect.
- Use of u-onbin for verbs with stems that end in /m b/ is found on Kyushu and in the far west of Honshu; in contrast, in Kyoto and most of Kansai, these verbs currently show consonantal onbin as in the standard language. For example, in some dialects the verb yobu (to call) (stem yob-) has the gerund form yōde, in contrast to yonde (used in standard Japanese and in the Kyoto dialect). The voicing of the suffix -te to -de indicates that these u-onbin forms originally contained nasalized /ũ/.
- Use of i-onbin for verbs with stems that end in /s/ survives dialectally in some regions, including much of Kansai (although not in Kyoto). Thus, forms such as daite can occur in place of standard dashite for the gerund of the verb dasu (to put out) (stem das-).
- Some dialect forms show consonantal onbin in verbs with stems ending in /k/ or /g/, where standard Japanese has i-onbin.

The use of onbin stems in inflected verb forms never become normative in literary written Classical Japanese. It is difficult to tell how frequent they were in speech at various historical periods.

Poser (1986), citing Wenck (1959), gives the following chronology for the written attestation of onbin in verb forms:

- /ri/ to /Q/: seen from the late 9th century.
- /ki gi/ to /i/: rarely seen until the mid 10th century, from which point it is found regularly.
- /wi/ (original /pi/) to /Q/: seen from the first half of the 11th century.
- /ti/ to /Q/: seen sporadically from 11th century, becoming regular at the end of the 16th century.

However, Frellesvig (1995) suggests that onbin changes must have been active well before these dates, arguing that they precede the intervocalic merger of /p/ and /w/ (dated at the latest to the end of the 10th century) and most likely began in the early 9th century or even the late 8th century.

=== Adjective endings ===
Two suffixes used in the inflection of adjectives underwent onbin changes. The Old Japanese adnominal ending -ki developed by onbin into the Late Middle Japanese and Modern Japanese nonpast ending -i, as in takai, the nonpast form of the adjective stem taka- (tall). The adjectival infinitive ending -ku developed an onbin variant -u: however, -ku remains the normal form of this ending in Standard Japanese. The use of -u (which fuses with the preceding vowel) as an adjectival infinitive ending is a characteristic of the language spoken in the Kansai (including Kyoto) and Kyushu regions. Using the adjective taka- again as an example, the Kansai dialect form takō corresponds to the Standard Japanese infinitive takaku. The pronunciation of the adjectival infinitive ending as -u in Kyoto vs. -ku in the Kanto region is mentioned as a dialectal difference in Rodrigues' Arte da Lingoa de Iapam. The variant ending -u shows some limited use in Standard Japanese as part of the rarely used "super-polite" construction (which occurs when the adjective is followed by the copula gozaimasu) and in a few isolated, fixed expressions: its use in these contexts can be attributed to borrowing from the Kyoto dialect.

== Phonetic development ==
Onbin sound changes likely had their roots in earlier phonetic variation in the pronunciation of Old Japanese consonants and vowels. Namely, the Old Japanese consonants /p k/ might have varied phonetically between voiceless stops [p k], voiced stops [b g], voiceless fricatives [ɸ x], and voiced continuants [β ɣ]. The consonants /b g/ were prenasalized and possibly could vary between stops [ᵐb ᵑg] and continuants [ᵐβ ᵑɣ]; vowels before /b g m n/ were likely phonetically nasalized. The high vowels /i u/ could possibly be reduced to coarticulations [ʲ ʷ] on the preceding consonant.

Between vowels in the middle of a word, original /p/ merged with the phoneme /w/ around the second half of the tenth century or during the 11th century. After this merger, /w/ eventually was lost before any vowel other than /a/. At the start of a word, original /p/ had come to be regularly pronounced as a voiceless labial fricative [ɸ] by the end of the 16th century (later on, a 17-18th century sound change turned [ɸ] into [h] before any vowel other than /u/). It was once widely thought that /p/ was completely replaced with [ɸ] already in Old Japanese, but Frellesvig (2010) argues that this assumption is not well justified. According to the traditional assumption, intervocalic /p/ merged with /w/ as a result of [ɸ] being voiced to [w]. According to a competing hypothesis, word-medial intervocalic /p/ was already phonetically voiced [b] or [β] in Early Middle Japanese prior to its merger with [w].

Consonantal variants of verbal onbin stems are attested later than the vocalic variants, but this does not necessarily mean that consonantal onbin are chronologically more recent sound changes: it could simply mean that the varieties of speech in which they arose were not well represented in writing until later on.

There is disagreement about the exact phonetic path by which onbin developed. The development of the consonantal onbin N and Q can be explained in terms of vowel deletion, whereas the development of i- and u-onbin can be interpreted as involving deletion of consonants between vowels. If intervocalic consonant deletion is the correct explanation for the origin of u-onbin from sequences involving original labial consonants (/p b m/), then the deletion of these consonants must have been preceded by a sound change that turned /pi bi mi/ into /pu bu mu/ in contexts where onbin would occur. Such a change does appear to be attested by spelling variations in texts from the 11th and 12th centuries, although some of this evidence admits other interpretations (such as a change of /bi mi/ in this context to a moraic [m] sound). The hypothesis of intervocalic consonant deletion implies that in cases where i-onbin or u-onbin is derived from a consonant-vowel sequence that originally started with a nasal or prenasalized consonant, the change of following /p t k s/ to prenasalized (modern voiced) /b d g z/ was not caused by assimilation between adjacent consonants; rather, it may have arisen by 'rightward' (progressive) spreading of nasality from a phonetically nasalized vowel that originally preceded the deleted consonant. The following examples illustrate ways i- and u-onbin might have developed per this approach:

- /tobite/ [tõᵐbite] > [tõᵐbute] > [tõmute] > [tõute] > [tõũte] > [tõũde]
- /kakite/ [kakite] > [kagite] > [kaɣite] > [kaite] /kaite/
- /kagite/ [kãgite] > [kãɣite] > [kãite] > [kãĩde] /kaide/
- /jomite/ > /jomute/ [jomute] > [jõute] > [jõũde] /joode/

De Chene 1991 advocates an alternative account for the development of i-onbin from original /gi/ and u-onbin from original /mu mi bu bi gu/, arguing there was an initial change of /gi/ to moraic [ɲ], /gu/ to moraic [ŋ], and /mu mi bu bi/ to moraic [m], followed by vocalization of moraic [ɲ] to [i] and of moraic [ŋ] and [m] to [u] (in cases where they did not alternatively become /N/). In support, de Chene cites the development of [u] from original /ga/ in the form kauburu "to place on the head' from kagapuru, (Note: De Chene uses the romanization "kagahuru".) arguing that this is easier to explain in terms of moraic nasal formation and vocalization ([ᵑga] > [ŋ] > [u]) rather than intervocalic consonant loss. De Chene also argues that the lack of onbin outcomes for word-final /gi/ and /bu bi gu/ implies that the development of these sequences to /i/ and /u/ involved a different mechanism from the intervocalic consonant deletion seen in the development of /ki ku/ to /i u/, which could occur word-finally. Like de Chene, Vance (1982) considers it possible that /gi/ became /i/ by means of vocalization of [ɲ], as in [kõᵑgʲite] > [kõɲde] > [kõĩde]. De Chene interprets the use in Heian-era texts of the "mu" kana in the spelling of words like "yomutaru" as an orthographic device representing moraic /m/; the following examples illustrate the development of u-onbin according to this approach:

- /jomitaru/ > /jomdaru/ > /joudaru/~/joNdaru/
- /waragutu/ > [waraŋdu] > /waraudu/~/waraNdu/

Instead of vowel or consonant deletion, Frellesvig (2010) prefers to explain onbin as a consequence of phonetic reduction of both the consonant and vowel, resulting in their fusion into a single phonetic segment (e.g. /mi/ > [mʲː], /pi/ > [βʲː]): that could then be phonologically reinterpreted as a single phoneme (vocalic or consonantal). The following example illustrates Frellesvig's approach to explaining onbin:

- /tugite/ [tũᵑɣʲːdʲe] > [tũĩⁿdʲe]

=== Reduction to mere prenasalization ===
The onbin sound changes discussed above turned consonant-vowel sequences (such as /bi ɡi mi ni/ or /bu ɡu mu nu/) into single segments (such as /ĩ ũ N/) that still counted as a mora when measuring the length of a word. However, some words appear to show a similar but distinct outcome, where a sequence such as /mi/ or /ni/ was reduced to prenasalization of the following consonant without leaving a moraic phoneme behind. These outcomes might be the result of sporadic reductions that were similar to onbin changes but occurred earlier, during time periods when syllables were only permitted to end in a short vowel. Reduction of the genitive particle no or the dative particle ni may be the origin of rendaku, or voicing of the second element of a Japanese compound word, which occurs often but not automatically.

Examples:

- Old Japanese /abiki/ 'trawling' from */ami-piki/ 'net-pull(ing)', /kizi/ from /kigisi/ 'pheasant', /jamadi/ from */jama-miti/ 'mountain-path'
- Early Middle Japanese /de/ from /nite/ and /nado/ from /nani-to/

== Examples of lexical onbin ==
The words listed below show the effects of onbin as a sound change, not including the grammatical onbin seen in verb and adjective forms. Many examples are compound words, in which case the first consonant of the second element may or may not become voiced as a result of rendaku. In some cases, it is not possible to determine whether rendaku was present before the application of onbin sound changes.

=== U-onbin ===
==== From -hito ====
The Old Japanese morpheme pi₁to₂ 'person' (Modern Japanese hito (人 (ひと)); with rendaku -bito (〜びと)) often shows u-onbin as the second element of a compound, producing words ending in -ōto or -ūto, or with rendaku, -ōdo or -ūdo. Examples include:

source	Old Japanese	outcome	Modern Japanese	alternative outcomes
pi	siro-pi₁to₂ 'white-person'	sirouto	shirōto (素人, layman, novice)	shiroto, shirabito
pi	kuro-pi₁to₂ 'black-person'	kurouto	kurōto (玄人, professional, expert, veteran)	kuroto
pi	oto₂ + pi₁to₂ 'younger sibling' + 'person'	otouto	otōto (弟, younger brother)	
pi	imo₁ + pi₁to₂ 'sister' + 'person'	imouto	imōto (妹, younger sister)	
pi	si + pi₁to₂	siuto	shūto (舅, stepfather; father-in-law)	
bi	aki₁ + pi₁to₂ > aki-bi₁to₂ 'trade-person'	akiũdo	akyūdo (商人, trader)	akindo
bi	kari + pi₁to₂ > kari-bi₁to₂ 'hunt' + 'person'	kariudo	karyūdo (狩人, hunter)	
bi	kura + pi₁to₂ > kura-bi₁to₂ 'warehouse' + 'person'	kuraudo	kurōdo (蔵人, warehouse keeper, archivist; sake/soy sauce/miso maker)	kurabito, kurando, kuraudu
bi	naka + pi₁to₂ > naka-bi₁to₂ 'middle/inside/relationship' + 'person'	nakaudo	nakōdo (仲人, matchmaker)	

==== From other core sources ====
Other examples from core sources (as per Frellesvig's categorization), excluding morphological onbin in verb and adjective inflection:

source	Old Japanese	outcome	Modern Japanese	alternative outcomes
pu	tapu-to₁-	tauto-	tōtoi (尊い, noble, exalted)	tatto-
ku	takume 'wholly'	taume		
bu	*sabusabu-si	saũzaũ-(si)-		
gu	ka + -kupasi > ka-gupasi	kaũbasi	kōbashii (香ばしい, fragrant)	kanbasi
gu	wara + kutu > wara-gutu 'straw'+'footwear'	waraũdu	warōzu (草鞋, straw sandals) (obsolete)	warazu, waranzu, waraji, waranji
gu	sita + kutu > sita-gutu 'below, under'+'footwear'	sitaũdu	shitōzu (type of sock)	sitagutu
mi	ko₁-mi₁ti 'small+road'	koũdi	kōji (小路, lane, alley)	kondi
mi	te-mi₁du 'hand+water'	teũdu	chōzu (手水, washwater; lavatory)	temizu
mi	kami₁-so 'paper+hemp'	kaũzo	kōzo (楮, Japanese paper mulberry)	
mi	kami₁-tu-ke₂no₁ 'high/upper Keno'	kaũduke(no)	Kōzuke (上野) (place name)	
mi	kami₁-pe₁ (or kami₁-be₁) 'upper+side'	kaũbe	kōbe (head)	
mi	kami₂-gami₂(si)	koũgoũ(si)	kōgōshii (神々しい, divine)	
mu	pi₁-muka(si)	piũga	Hyūga (日向) (place name)	pingasi
mu	kamu-pe₁ (or kamu-be₁) 'god-house'	kaũbe	Kōbe (神戸) (place name)	

==== From other sequences ====
Specific words
source	Old Japanese	outcome	Modern Japanese	alternative outcomes
wi > u	mawide	maude	-mōde (詣(で), visit (to a shrine))	
wo > u	mawos-	maus-	mōsu (申す, to say)	
wo > u	*te-wona 'hand-hatchet'	teuna	chōna (手斧, adze)	teono
ga > ũ	kagapuri	kaũburi	kōburi (冠, crown, order, rank)	kaburi, kamuri, kanburi, kanmuri
ga > ũ	kagapuru	kaũburu	kōmuru (被る; incur, sustain)	kaburu, kamuru
pa > u	papaki₁	pauki	hōki (箒, broom)	
pa > u	kapabori?	kaubori/-mori	kōmori (コウモリ, bat)	kawahori

=== I-onbin ===
Examples from core sources (as per Frellesvig's categorization), excluding morphological onbin in verb and adjective inflection:

source	Old Japanese	outcome	Modern Japanese	alternative outcomes
ki	yaki₁ + pa > yaki-ba 'burned-edge'	yaiba	yaiba (刃, forged blade, sword)	
ki	tuki₁ + kaki₁	tuigaki	tsuigaki (築垣, mud wall with a roof) (archaic)	
ki	tuki₁ + fidi	tuizi	tsuiji (築地, roofed mud wall)	
ki	suki + kaki₁	suigai	suigai (透垣, a type of fence) (archaic)	suigaki
ki	saki₁-tama	saitama	Saitama (埼玉) (place name)	Saidama
ki	saki₁-papi₁	saipapi	saiwai (幸い, happiness, fortune)	
gi	tugi₁te	tuĩde	tsuide (序で, order)	
gi	tugi-matu	tuimatu	tsuimatsu (続松, torch) (archaic)	

=== N-onbin (hatsuonbin) ===
Examples from core sources (as per Frellesvig's categorization), excluding morphological onbin in verb and adjective inflection:

source	Old Japanese	outcome	Modern Japanese	alternative outcomes
ni	nani	naN	nan (何, what)	
nu	kinu + kaki 'silk'+'fence'	kiNgai	kingai (type of ceremonial silk shroud) (archaic)	
mi	womi₁na	woNna	onna (女, woman)	wouna (archaic)
mu	kamukapu	kaNgapu	kangaeru (考える, think, consider)	
mu	kamu-nagi kamu-nusi	kaNnagi kaNnusi	kannagi (巫, shrine maiden, medium) kannushi (神主, a Shinto priest)	kaunagi
bi	aki₁ + pi₁to₂ > aki-bi₁to₂ 'trade-man'	akiNdo	akindo (商人, merchant)	akiudo > akyūdo
gu	ka + -kupasi > ka-gupasi	kaNbasi	kanbashii (芳しい, fragrant)	kaũbasi
gu	wara + kutu > wara-gutu 'straw' + 'footwear'	waraNdu	waranzu, waranji (草鞋, straw sandals) (obsolete)	warazu, waraji, waraudu > warōzu

From other sequences:

source	Old Japanese	outcome	Modern Japanese	alternative outcomes
di > N	kadi + tori 'rudder/oar' + 'take'	kaNdori		kajitori (舵取り, helmsman; steersman; steering)
ga > N	kagapuri	kaNburi	kanburi, kanmuri (冠, headdress, crown)	kōburi, kaburi, kamuri
ma > N	sama	saN	-san (さん) (polite suffix)	
mo > N	nemoko₂ro₂	neNgoro	nengoro (懇ろ, courteous)	

=== Q-onbin (sokuonbin) ===
Examples from core sources (as per Frellesvig's categorization), excluding morphological onbin in verb and adjective inflection:

source	Old Japanese	outcome	Modern Japanese	alternative outcomes
pi	*nipi₁-ta 'new + field'	nitta	Nitta (新田) (a surname)	niuta
pi	*wo-pi₁to₂ 'man + person'	wotto	otto (夫, husband)	
pu	tapu-to₁-	tatto-	tattoi (尊い, noble, exalted)	tauto-

From other sequences:

source	Old Japanese	outcome	Modern Japanese	alternative outcomes
ri	*kari-ta	katta	Katta-gun (刈田郡; Katta district) (place name)	
ri	pori-su	possu	hossuru (欲する, to desire, attempt)	
ri	kusuguri-ta-	kusugutta-	kusuguttai (くすぐったい, ticklish)	
ru	urutapu	uttapu	uttaeru (訴える, to sue, complain)	
ti	*moti-para	moppara		
ti	*uti-te	utte		
tu	*yatu-ko₁	yakko	yakko (奴, servant, footman)	
ra	warapa	wappa	wappa (わっぱ, child) (archaic)	warawa

== Bibliography ==
- Ashworth, David (1976), "Historical Perspective on Voicing and the Gerund in Japanese", Papers in Japanese Linguistics, 5: 27–39
- de Chene, Brent (1991), "The Onbin of g-initial syllables", Journal of Japanese Linguistics, 13
- Frellesvig, Bjarke (1995). A Case Study in Diachronic Phonology: The Japanese Onbin Sound Changes. Aarhus University Press. ISBN 87-7288-489-4.
- Frellesvig, Bjarke (2010). A History of the Japanese Language. Cambridge University Press.
- Hamano, Shoko (2000), "Voicing of Obstruents in Old Japanese: Evidence from the Sound-Symbolic Stratum", Journal of East Asian Linguistics, 9 (3): 207–225
- Hepburn, J. C. (1894), A Japanese-English and English-Japanese dictionary (Fifth ed.)
- Irwin, Mark (2009). "Mora Obstruent Allomorphy in Sino-Japanese Morphemes".
- Ito, Junko; Mester, Armin (2015), "Word formation and phonological processes", in Kubozono, Haruo (ed.), Handbook of Japanese Phonetics and Phonology, Berlin: De Gruyter, pp. 363–395
- Martin, Samuel E. (1987), The Japanese Language Through Time, Yale University Press
- Otake, Takashi (2015), "Mora and mora-timing", in Kubozono, Haruo (ed.), Handbook of Japanese Phonetics and Phonology, Berlin: De Gruyter, pp. 493–524, doi:10.1515/9781614511984.493, ISBN 978-1-61451-252-3
- Poser, William (1986), "Japanese Evidence Bearing on the Compensatory Lengthening Controversy", in Wetzels, Leo; Sezer, Engin (eds.), Studies in Compensatory Lengthening, Foris Publications, pp. 167–186
- Takayama, Tomoaki (2015), "Historical phonology", in Kubozono, Haruo (ed.), Handbook of Japanese Phonetics and Phonology, Berlin: De Gruyter, pp. 621–650, doi:10.1515/9781614511984.621, ISBN 978-1-61451-252-3
- Unger, J. Marshall (1997), "A Case Study in Diachronic Phonology: The Japanese Onbin Sound Changes. By Bjarke Frellesvig. Aarhus, Denmark: Aarhus University Press, 1995. Pp. 168.", Diachronica (review), 14 (2): 363–366
- Unger, J. Marshall (2004), "Alternations of m and b in Early Middle Japanese: The Deeper Significance of the Sound-Symbolic Stratum", Japanese Language and Literature, 38 (2): 323–337
- Vance, Timothy J. (1982), "On the Origin of Voicing Alteration in Japanese Consonants", Journal of the American Oriental Society, 102 (2): 333–341
- Vance, Timothy J. (2022), Irregular Phonological Marking of Japanese Compounds, Mouton-NINJAL Library of Linguistics, De Gruyter, doi:10.1515/9783110755107, ISBN 978-3-11-075501-5
- Wenck, Günther (1959), Japanische Phonetik, vol. 4, Wiesbaden: Otto Harrassowitz
