= Sound change =

Process of language change that affects pronunciation or sound system structure

In historical linguistics, a sound change is a change in the pronunciation of a language. A sound change can involve the replacement of one speech sound (or, more generally, one phonetic feature value) by a different one (called phonetic change) or a more general change to the speech sounds that exist (phonological change), such as the merger of two sounds or the creation of a new sound. A sound change can eliminate the affected sound, or a new sound can be added. Sound changes can be environmentally conditioned if the change occurs in only some sound environments, and not others.

The term "sound change" refers to diachronic changes, which occur in a language's sound system. On the other hand, "alternation" refers to changes that happen synchronically (within the language of an individual speaker, depending on the neighbouring sounds) and do not change the language's underlying system (for example, the -s in the English plural can be pronounced differently depending on the preceding sound, as in bet[s], bed[z], which is a form of alternation, rather than sound change). Since "sound change" can refer to the historical introduction of an alternation (such as postvocalic /k/ in the Tuscan dialect, which was once [k] as in di [k]arlo 'of Carlo' but is now [h] di [h]arlo and alternates with [k] in other positions: con [k]arlo 'with Carlo'), that label is inherently imprecise and must often be clarified as referring to either phonemic change or restructuring.

Research on sound change is usually conducted under the working assumption that it is regular, which means that it is expected to apply mechanically whenever its structural conditions are met, irrespective of any non-phonological factors like the meaning of the words that are affected. Apparent exceptions to regular change can occur because of dialect borrowing, grammatical analogy, or other causes known and unknown; and changes are described as "sporadic" when they affect only one or a few particular words, without any apparent regularity.

The Neogrammarian linguists of the 19th century introduced the term sound law to refer to formulations of regular change, perhaps in imitation of the laws of physics, and the term "law" is still used in referring to specific sound changes that are named after their authors like Grimm's law and Grassmann's law. Real-world sound laws often admit exceptions, but the expectation of their regularity or absence of exceptions is of great heuristic value by allowing historical linguists to define the notion of regular correspondence by the comparative method.

Each sound change is limited in space and time and so it functions in a limited area (within certain dialects) and for a limited period of time. For those and other reasons, the term "sound law" has been criticized for implying a universality that is unrealistic for sound change.

A sound change that affects the phonological system or the number or distribution of its phonemes is a phonological change.

== Principles ==
The following statements are used as heuristics in formulating sound changes as understood within the Neogrammarian model. However, for modern linguistics, they are not taken as inviolable precepts but are seen as guidelines.

Sound change has no memory: Sound change does not discriminate between the sources of a sound. If a previous sound change causes X,Y > Y (features X and Y merge as Y), a new one cannot affect only an original X.

Sound change ignores grammar: A sound change can have only phonological constraints, like X > Z in unstressed syllables. For example, it cannot affect only adjectives. The only exception is that a sound change may recognise word boundaries, even when they are unindicated by prosodic clues. Also, sound changes may be regularized in inflectional paradigms (such as verbal inflection), when it is no longer phonological but morphological in nature.

Sound change is exceptionless: If a sound change can happen at a place, it will affect all sounds that meet the criteria for change. Apparent exceptions are possible because of analogy and other regularization processes, another sound change, or an unrecognized conditioning factor. That is the traditional view expressed by the Neogrammarians. In the past decades, however, this has been challenged by the theory of lexical diffusion, which argues that sound change need not necessarily affect all possible words. However, when a sound change is initiated, it often eventually expands to the whole lexicon. For example, the Spanish fronting of the Vulgar Latin [g] (voiced velar stop) before [i e ɛ] seems to have reached every possible word. By contrast, the voicing of word-initial Latin [k] to [g] occurred in colaphus > golpe and cattus > gato but not in canna > caña.

Sound change is inevitable: All languages vary from place to place and time to time, and neither writing nor media prevents that change.

== Formal notation ==
A statement of the form

A > B

is to be read as "Sound A changes into (or is replaced by, is reflected as, etc.) sound B". Therefore, A belongs to an older stage of the language in question, and B belongs to a more recent stage. The symbol ">" can be reversed, B < A, which also means that the (more recent) B derives from the (older) A":

POc. *t > Rot. f

means that "Proto-Oceanic (POc.) *t is reflected as [f] in Rotuman (Rot.)".

The two sides of such a statement indicate only the start and the end of the change, but additional intermediate stages may have occurred. The example above is actually a compressed account of a sequence of changes: *[t] first changed to [θ] (like the initial consonant of English thin), which has since yielded [f] and can be represented more fully:

t > θ > f

Unless a change operates unconditionally (in all environments), the context in which it applies must be specified:

A > B /X__Y

= "A changes to B when it is preceded by X and followed by Y."

For example:

It. b > v /[vowel]__[vowel], which can be simplified to just
It. b > v /V__V (in which the V stands for any vowel)

= "Intervocalic [b] (inherited from Latin) became [v] in Italian" (such as in caballum, dēbet > cavallo 'horse', deve 'owe (3rd pers. sing.)'

Here is a second example:

PIr. [−cont][−voi] > [+cont] /__[C][+cont]

= "A preconsonantal voiceless non-continuant (voiceless stop) changed into a corresponding voiceless continuant (fricative) in Proto-Iranian (PIr.) when it was immediately followed by a continuant consonant (a resonant or a fricative)": Proto-Indo-Iranian *pra 'forth' > Avestan fra; *trayas "three" (masc. nom. pl.)> Av. θrayō; *čatwāras "four" (masc. nom. pl.) > Av. čaθwārō; *pśaws "of a cow" (nom. *paśu) > Av. fšāoš (nom. pasu). The fricativization did not occur before stops and so *sapta "seven" > Av. hapta. (However, in the variety of Iranian that led to Old Persian, fricativization occurred in all clusters: Old Persian hafta "seven".)

The symbol "#" stands for a word boundary (initial or final) and so the notation "/__#" means "word-finally", and "/#__" means "word-initially":

Gk. [stop] > ∅ /__#

= "Word-final stops were deleted in Greek (Gk.)".

That can be simplified to

Gk. P > ∅ / __#

in which P stands for any plosive.

== Terms for changes in pronunciation ==
In historical linguistics, a number of traditional terms designate types of phonetic change, either by nature or result. A number of such types are often (or usually) sporadic, that is, more or less accidents that happen to a specific form. Others affect a whole phonological system. Sound changes that affect a whole phonological system are also classified according to how they affect the overall shape of the system; see phonological change.

- Assimilation: One sound becomes more like another, or (much more rarely) two sounds become more like each other. Example: in Latin the prefix *kom- becomes con- before an apical stop ([t d]) or [n]: contactus' "touched", condere "to found, establish", connūbium "legal marriage". The great majority of assimilations take place between contiguous segments, and the great majority involve the earlier sound becoming more like the later one (e.g. in connūbium, m- + n becomes -nn- rather than -mm-). Assimilation between contiguous segments are (diachronically speaking) exceptionless sound laws rather than sporadic, isolated changes.
- Dissimilation: The opposite of assimilation. One sound becomes less like another, or (much more rarely) two sounds become less like each other. Examples: Classical Latin quīnque /kʷiːnkʷe/ "five" > Vulgar Latin *kinkʷe (whence French cinq, Italian cinque, etc.); Old Spanish omne "man" > Spanish hombre. The great majority of dissimilations involve segments that are not contiguous, but, as with assimilations, the great majority involve an earlier sound changing with reference to a later one. Dissimilation is usually a sporadic phenomenon, but Grassmann's Law (in Sanskrit and Greek) exemplifies a systematic dissimilation. If the change of a sequence of fricatives such that one becomes a stop is dissimilation, then such changes as Proto-Germanic *hs to /ks/ (spelled x) in English would count as a regular sound law: PGmc. *sehs "six" > Old English siex, etc.
- Metathesis: Two sounds switch places. Example: Old English thridda became Middle English third. Most such changes are sporadic, but occasionally a sound law is involved, as Romance *tl > Spanish ld, thus *kapitlu, *titlu "chapter (of a cathedral)", "tittle" > Spanish cabildo, tilde. Metathesis can take place between non-contiguous segments, as Greek amélgō "I milk" > Modern Greek armégō.
- Lenition: "Weakening" of a consonant from one that takes more effort to pronounce (and more constriction in the vocal tract) to one that takes less, e.g. a stop consonant becoming an affricate or fricative.
- Fortition: the opposite of lenition, "strengthening" a consonant, e.g. an approximant becoming an affricate or fricative.
- Reduction: Whereas the weakening of consonants is called lenition, the weakening of vowels is called reduction. For example, in most varieties of English, unstressed vowels often reduce to a schwa, such as the two a's in arena.
- Tonogenesis: Syllables come to have distinctive pitch contours.
- Sandhi: Conditioned changes that take place at word-boundaries but not elsewhere. It can be morpheme-specific, as in the loss of the vowel in the enclitic forms of English is /ɪz/, with subsequent change of /z/ to /s/ adjacent to a voiceless consonant Frank's not here /ˈfræŋksnɒtˈhɪər/. Or a small class of elements, such as the assimilation of the /ð/ of English the, this and that to a preceding /n/ (including the /n/ of and when the /d/ is elided) or /l/: all the often /ɔːllə/, in the often /ɪnnə/, and so on. As in these examples, such features are rarely indicated in standard orthography. In a striking exception, Sanskrit orthography reflects a wide variety of such features; thus, tat "that" is written tat, tac, taj, tad, or tan depending on what the first sound of the next word is. These are all assimilations, but medial sequences do not assimilate the same way.
- Haplology: The loss of a syllable when an adjacent syllable is similar or (rarely) identical. Example: Old English Englaland became Modern English England, or the common pronunciation of probably as [ˈprɒbli]. This change usually affects commonly used words. The word haplology itself is sometimes jokingly pronounced haplogy.
- Elision, aphaeresis, syncope, and apocope: All are losses of sounds. Elision is the loss of unstressed sounds, aphaeresis the loss of initial sounds, syncope is the loss of medial sounds, and apocope is the loss of final sounds.
  - Elision examples: in the southeastern United States, unstressed schwas tend to drop, so "American" is not /əˈmɛɹəkən/ but /ˈmɚkən/. Standard English is possum < opossum.
  - Syncope examples: the Old French word for "state" is estat, but the s disappeared, yielding état. Similarly, the loss of /t/ in English soften, hasten, castle, etc.
  - Apocope examples: the final -e [ə] in Middle English words was pronounced, but is only retained in spelling as a silent E. In English /b/ and /ɡ/ were apocopated in final position after nasals: lamb, long /læm/, /lɒŋ ~ lɔːŋ/.
- Epenthesis (also known as anaptyxis): The introduction of a sound between two adjacent sounds. Examples: Latin humilis > English humble; in Slavic an -l- intrudes between a labial and a following yod, as *zemya "land" > Russian zemlya (земля). Most commonly, epenthesis is in the nature of a "transitional" consonant, but vowels may be epenthetic: non-standard English film in two syllables, athlete in three. Epenthesis can be regular, as when the Indo-European "tool" suffix *-tlom everywhere becomes Latin -culum (so speculum "mirror" < *speḱtlom, pōculum "drinking cup" < *poH_{3}-tlom). Some scholars reserve the term epenthesis for "intrusive" vowels and use excrescence for intrusive consonants.
- Prothesis: The addition of a sound at the beginning of a word. Example: word-initial /s/ + stop clusters in Latin gained a preceding /e/ in Old Spanish and Old French; hence, the Spanish word for "state" is estado, deriving from Latin status.
- Nasalization: Vowels followed by nasal consonants can become nasalized. If the nasal consonant is lost but the vowel retains its nasalized pronunciation, nasalization becomes phonemic, that is, distinctive. Example: French "-in" words used to be pronounced [in], but are now pronounced [ɛ̃], and the [n] is no longer pronounced (except in cases of liaison).

== Examples of specific sound changes in various languages ==
- Anglo-Frisian nasal spirant law
- Canaanite shift
- Cot-caught merger
- Dahl's law
- Grassmann's law
- Great Vowel Shift (English)
- Grimm's law
- High German consonant shift
- Kluge's law
- Onbin
- Phonetic change "f → h" in Spanish
- Ruki sound law
- Slavic palatalization
- Umlaut
- Verner's law

== See also ==
- Glossary of sound laws in the Indo-European languages
