= Canaanite shift =

Vowel shift/sound change in the Canaanite dialects

In historical linguistics, the Canaanite shift is a vowel shift/sound change that took place in the Canaanite dialects, which belong to the Northwest Semitic branch of the Semitic languages family. This sound change caused Proto-NW-Semitic *ā (long a) to turn into ō (long o) in Proto-Canaanite. It accounts, for example, for the difference between the second vowel of Hebrew שלום (šalom, Tiberian šālōm) and its Arabic cognate سلام (salām). The original word was probably *šalām-, with the ā preserved in Arabic, but transformed into ō in Hebrew. The change is attested in records from the Amarna Period, dating it to the mid-2nd millennium BCE.

== Conditioning ==
This vowel shift is well attested in Hebrew and other Canaanite languages, but its exact nature has historically been contested.

Brockelmann (1908) held that the Canaanite Shift only affected stressed vowels, formulating the shift as *ā́ > *ṓ.

Bauer and Leander (1922) treat the cases of apparently preserved *ā as evidence for their theory of Hebrew as a mixed language.

Birkeland (1940) discounted some of Brockelmann’s most important counterexamples of the Canaanite Shift. Based on irregular correspondences and evidence from Arabic and Phoenician spellings, he explains II-wy and III-wy perfect forms like קָם and גָּלָה as relatively late contractions from triradical forms like *qawama and *galawa, which postdate the operation of the Canaanite Shift. Word-final cases of -å, in Birkeland’s view, are late restitutions, resulting from dialect borrowing. Having thus eliminated most of the counterexamples that motivated the proponents of stress conditioning, he posits an unconditioned shift of *ā > *ō.

Suchard (2019) found that the Canaanite Shift was absent from words where *ā was preceded by *u or *w in the preceding syllable. He explained the handful of words where the Canaanite Shift occurred despite *u in the preceding syllable (such as ִרִמּוֹן rimmōn ‘pomegranate’ from *rummān-um) as a product of dissimilation of *u to *i when *u was adjacent to a bilabial consonant, a separate sound change known as Suchard's Law.

== Arabic–Hebrew parallels ==
The shift was so productive in Canaanite languages that it altered their inflectional and derivational morphologies wherever they contained the reflex of a pre-Canaanite *ā, as can be seen in Hebrew, the most attested of Canaanite languages, by comparing it with Arabic, a well-attested non-Canaanite Semitic language.

=== Present participle of Qal verbs ===
Classical Arabic فاعل (fāʻil) vs. Tiberian Hebrew פועל (pōʻēl)

Arabic	Translation	Hebrew	Translation
كاتِب kātib	writer	כּוֹתֵב kōṯēḇ	writer, writing
فاتِح fātiḥ	opener	פּוֹתֵחַ pōṯēaḥ	opener, opening (attrib.)
كاهِن kāhin	soothsayer, augur, priest	כֹּהֵן kōhēn	priest (male descendant of Aaron)

=== Feminine plural ===
Classical Arabic ات- (-āt) vs. Tiberian Hebrew ות- (-ōṯ)

Arabic	Hebrew	Translation
بَنات banāt	בָּנוֹת bānōṯ	girls, daughters
مِئات miʼāt	מֵאוֹת mēʼōṯ	hundreds
مَلِكات malikāt	מְלָכוֹת məlāḵōṯ	queens

=== Noun ===
Classical Arabic فعال (fi‘āl, fa‘āl) vs. Tiberian Hebrew פעול (pă‘ōl, pā‘ōl)

Arabic	Hebrew	Translation
حمار ḥimār	חמור ḥămōr	donkey
سلام salām	שלום šālōm	peace
لسان lisān	לשון lāšōn	tongue

Classical Arabic فأل (faʼl) vs. Tiberian Hebrew פול, פאל (pōl)

Arabic	Hebrew	Translation
كأس kaʼs	כוס kōs	glass
رأس raʼs	ראש rōš	head, chief

=== Other words ===
Arabic	Hebrew	Translation
لا lā	לא lō	no
ذراع ḏirāʻ	זרוע zərōaʻ	arm
عالم ʻālam	עולם ʻōlām	world, universe

In one of the above lexical items (rōš), the shift did not only affect originally long vowels, but also originally short vowels occurring in the vicinity of a historically attested glottal stop in Canaanite.

Transcriptions of the Phoenician language reveal that the change also took place there – see suffete.

== Uses of the shift ==
Often when new source material in an old Semitic language is uncovered, the Canaanite shift may be used to date the source material or to establish that the source material is written in a specifically Canaanite language. The shift is especially useful since it affects long vowels whose presence is likely to be recorded by matres lectionis such as aleph and waw, even in a defective consonantal script. In languages where the shift occurs, it also gives historical linguists reason to suppose that other shifts may have taken place.

== See also ==
- Chain shift
- Great Vowel Shift

== Bibliography ==
- Blau, Joshua (1996), Studies in Hebrew Linguistics, Jerusalem: The Magnes Press, The Hebrew University
- Cross, Frank (1980), "Newly Found Inscriptions in Old Canaanite and Early Phoenician Scripts", Bulletin of the American Schools of Oriental Research, vol. 238, no. 238, The American Schools of Oriental Research, pp. 1–20, doi:10.2307/1356511, JSTOR 1356511, S2CID 222445150
- Fox, Joshua (1996), "A Sequence of Vowel Shifts in Phoenician and Other Languages", Journal of Near Eastern Studies, vol. 55, pp. 37–47, doi:10.1086/373783, S2CID 161890998
- Wehr, Hans (1993), Arabic–English Dictionary
