= Evolution of Latin /f/ in Spanish =

Historical change in the Spanish language

The phonetic sound change /f/ → [h] (a form of debuccalization), followed by a phonemic restructuring resulting in the complete loss of the sound (/f/ > /Ø/), represents a significant development in the phonological history of the Spanish language. This change is also observed in various Romance languages, including Gascon, Aromanian, Moldavian, Transylvanian Romanian and Most Eastern Asturleonese, as well as sporadically in other Romance languages. Under specific phonological conditions, the initial Latin /f/ evolved to [h], which eventually disappeared in standard Spanish. However, its pronunciation persists in some words across certain dialects, particularly in parts of Andalusia, Extremadura, and Latin America. It is also maintained in transitional dialects such as Cantabro and Extremaduran. An example of this phenomenon is the Latin word FARĪNA, which evolved to /aˈrina/ in Spanish (with the ⟨h⟩ retained in the spelling harina) compared to the Italian /faˈrina/ for "flour").

== The phoneme /f/ in Latin phonology ==
Main peoples of the pre-Roman Iberian Peninsula whose Paleohispanic languages may have influenced the process

=== The place of /f/ in the consonant system ===
In Latin words inherited from the proto-language, /f/ could only appear in the initial position. In intermediate positions, it was present primarily in borrowings from other languages (e.g., RUFUS, which was likely borrowed from a neighboring Italic language), or in derived words formed by adding a prefix to a word beginning with F (e.g.: DE-FENDERE, CON-FUNDERE). Following the disappearance of /h/, /f/ was Latin's only fricative apart from /s/, leading to its unstable integration within the consonantal system. As a result, it was particularly susceptible to phonetic evolution.

=== Phonetic variability of /f/ ===
The sound denoted by the grapheme F may not have been strictly labiodental but could have been bilabial [ɸ]. Even if /f/ functioned as an isolated phoneme, it may have had two allophones in pronunciation. Some researchers argue that this characteristic developed in Spanish under the influence of Indo-European languages spoken in the region where the language originated; however, this assertion is difficult to verify. It is likely that in Ibero-Romanic dialects, the bilabial pronunciation was more commonly used.

The labiodental realization of /f/, which appears in languages such as French, Italian, Portuguese, and Romanian, may have emerged through analogy with the change [β] > [v]. In these languages, the originally Latin semivowel /w/ transitioned to [β] and ultimately consolidated into a labiodental /v/. This particular evolutionary phase did not occur in the northern regions of the Iberian Peninsula. If /f/ is assumed to have been pronounced labiodentally, it would not have had a corresponding sound partner, leading to a lack of conformity within the consonant system.

== Evolution of /f/ in Spanish ==
=== Possible allophones and their distribution ===
The phoneme /f/ can be realized as a bilabial fricative [ɸ], which exhibits variability in its phonetic realization based on surrounding sounds. This articulation may manifest as either fortis or lenis, resulting in three proposed allophones:

- [h] before the back vowels /o, u/,
- [hɸh] (which can also be transcribed as [ɸh]) before the semivowel /w/, and
- [ɸ] in the other positions; that is, before the vowels /i, e, a/ and the consonants /j, l, r/.

The distribution of allophones can be influenced by phonological conditions, which may reinforce or relax articulation. For instance, /f/ can be affected by neighboring sounds, leading to variations like aspiration. In Gascon, the [h] articulation is generalized across all positions, whereas in Spanish, it primarily occurs before vowels, with some exceptions (notably before the diphthong 'ue'):

- FATU > hado (also in Spanish)
- FESTA > hèsta, Spanish fiesta
- FILU > híu, Spanish hilo or filo
- FLORE > hlor, Spanish flor
- FRATRE > hray (brother), Spanish fraile / fray
- FRUCTU > heruto, Spanish fruto
- CONFINE > couhí, Spanish confín
- PROFUNDU > prouhoun, Spanish profundo

Similar phonetic changes have been observed in various regions of Latin Europe:

- Romanian Rural Dialects: Common occurrences include FERRU > hier (Castilian hierro), FILIU > hiu (Castilian hijo);
- Calabria, Southern Italy: The sound change manifests as FABA > hava (Castilian haba) and FEMINA > hímmina (Castilian hembra);
- Brescia, Lombardy, Northern Italy: Examples include FAMEN > ham (Castilian hambre) and FEBRUARIU > hebrer (Castilian febrero);
- Isolated areas of Sardinia: In these regions, the F- has completely disappeared, leading to transformations such as FOCU > oku (Castilian fuego) and FUMU > ummu (Castilian humo).
- Most Central and Eastern Asturleonese dialects experience this aspiration sporadically always in front of diphthongs /we/ or /wi/: FOCU > ḥueu, ḥuebu (Castilian: fuego), FOLIA > ḥueya (Castilian hoja), FAGINA > ḥuina. In most central dialects, this is sporadic and a speaker may say both versions indistinctively, thus it is usually not reflected in writing.
- Eastern Asturleonese dialects of Llanes and Cabrales, examples: Examples include FAMEN > ḥambre (Castilian hambre) and FEBRUARIU > ḥebreru (Castilian febrero).

=== First written testimonies of the change in the historical Castile ===
The earliest evidence for the phonetic change from /f/ to /h/ or the complete loss of /f/ in historical Castile (including La Rioja), dates back to the 9th century. Notably, in a document from 863, the Latin name FORTICIUS is recorded as Ortiço, and in another from 927, it appears as Hortiço. From the 11th century onward, the instances of this change become more frequent, not only in Castile but also in other regions. The sporadic written documentation suggests that this phonetic change may have occurred earlier in spoken language.

It remains uncertain whether this phonetic realization was widespread across all social classes in Castile. The change may have been predominantly observed among lower social strata, while the educated and more conservative classes may have continued to pronounce [f] or [ɸ] in all positions. Alternatively, the aspiration [h] might have been articulated primarily before back vowels. However, definitive conclusions about the extent of this phonetic evolution cannot be drawn until it is consistently reflected in written records, especially since aspiration was often represented by the grapheme "f-" for many centuries. This phenomenon is exemplified in works such as the Cantar de mio Cid, where the Arabic-deriver preposition hasta (from Arabic ḥatta) appears as fasta. Similarly, the Arabic term al-ḥanbal was adopted into Spanish as alfombra. This suggests that speakers may not have recognized a significant acoustic difference between the pronunciations [f] and [h]. Alarcos Llorach (1951) posits that:

In the speaker's sentiment, the substitution of h for f did not entail any change of meaning; phonologically, they would be variants of a single phoneme. For the cultured, between these two variants there would be a certain valuational relationship: the f would be more cultured, the h more rustic; both sounds would be, then, stylistic variants of a single phoneme.

=== Phonological context ===
In Spanish, the aspirated articulation of /f/ as [h] is generalized in all pre-voiced positions. This can be observed in the following examples:

- FACERE > hacer
- FÉMINA > hembra
- FERRU > hierro
- FILIU > hijo
- FOLIA > hoja
- FUMU > humo
- Some exceptions exist, often relating to cultisms, including febrero, fiebre, fiesta, filo, fin.

Prefixed words have also undergone similar phonetic changes once they were recognized as such:

- OFFOCARE > ahogar
- SUFFUMARE > sahumar

In other contexts, intervocalic -F- typically evolved into a [β], represented by v or b in writing, following the analogy of the evolution of original voiceless stops:

- PROFECTU > provecho
- RAPHANU (< Gr. ῥάφανος) > rábano

However, instances of complete loss also occur.

- DEFENSAM > dehesa

In Medieval Spanish, the sequence -NF- gave -f- (or -ff-), as seen in INFANTE > ifante or iffante, which later standardized as infante in contemporary Spanish.

The F- sound has been preserved before consonants, as well as before the semiconsonant [w]. In certain regions, particularly Andalusia and some areas of Spanish America, it may be articulated as an aspirate or a velar fricative in this position. This can be attributed to the labial nature of [w], which can accommodate the preservation of the labial articulations [ɸ] or [f]:

- FOCUS > fuego
- FONTIS > fuente
- FORTE > fuerte
- FUIMUS > fuimos
- FLORE > flor
- FRIGIDU > frío

There are rare instances where the FL- group loses the initial F-, such as FLACCIDU > lacio. This suggests that, on occasion, the aspiration [hl-] may have appeared. However, in most contexts, the initial f is retained, indicating that other phonetic factors likely influenced these outcomes, similar to the palatalization that affects the initial CL- and PL- groups.

== The change /f/ → [h] and Basque–Latin bilingualism ==
=== Arguments in favor of the Basque substratum ===
One widely accepted explanation for the phonetic change from /f/ to [h] in certain Romance languages, particularly Castilian and Gascon, is attributed to the influence of the Basque substratum. This theory, articulated by Ramón Menéndez Pidal, suggests that the Basques, along with the Cantabri and possibly the Iberians—whose languages did not include the sound [f]—substituted it with [h], which they perceived as acoustically similar. This hypothesis is supported by several key points. The earliest documented occurrences of the /f/ to [h] change were found in northern Castile, an area adjacent to regions where Basque was spoken. This geographic proximity implies a potential linguistic influence from Basque speakers on the emerging Spanish dialects. Additionally, the phenomenon also appears in Gascon, which lies on the other side of the Pyrenees. This region, historically inhabited by peoples who spoke Basque or similar languages, further strengthens the argument for a Basque substratum affecting local languages.

While similar changes have been documented in other parts of Latin Europe, the widespread and systematic adoption of the /f/ to [h] change is notably prominent in Castilian and Gascon. This suggests that these areas were more significantly influenced by the ancient Basque–Aquitanian populations, which predated the Roman conquest. The absence of the /f/ sound in the Basque language may have led to a natural phonetic shift in neighboring languages, where speakers adapted their pronunciation in contact situations, favoring aspirated forms over non-existent phonemes.

==== Objections against the substrate theories ====
While the theory proposing a Basque substratum as a catalyst for the phonetic change from /f/ to [h] has gained some acceptance, it has also faced several objections. One primary concern is the uncertainty surrounding the existence of the aspirated sound [h] in medieval Basque. This raises questions about whether [h] could realistically have replaced [f]. Menéndez Pidal argued that Latin /f/ was labiodental rather than bilabial. However, it is unclear whether Basque speakers were unable to articulate the labiodental [f], particularly given that in certain Basque dialects, what was previously a bilabial fricative evolved into a labiodental [f] in intervocalic positions. Basque philologist Koldo Mitxelena noted that Basques historically did not appear to struggle with producing this sound.

Another argument against the influence of a Basque substratum is the preservation of initial /f/ in the Romance dialects of Navarre, an area with a significant Basque-speaking population. If the presence of Basque speakers was a critical factor in the phonetic shift, one might expect to see similar changes in the Navarrese dialect.

Additionally, some researchers have taken a broader perspective on the issue. The /f/ to [h] change has been documented in other Neo-Latin language areas, suggesting that it may not be exclusively tied to the influence of a Basque substratum. If the phenomenon can be understood through the internal structural dynamics of the language itself, additional external factors may not be necessary to explain the change. For example, Malmberg proposed that the shift represents the loss of the articulatory feature of labiality in regions isolated from other Western Romance dialects, indicating that intrinsic linguistic factors alone could have initiated the change.

=== Alternative hypotheses ===
In addition to the theories previously discussed, some scholars have approached the phonetic shift from /f/ to [h] from more abstract perspectives. One such perspective is presented by Spanish philologist Gregorio Salvador, who proposed a geological hypothesis in 1983. According to Salvador, the primary cause of this phenomenon was the loss of teeth among early Spanish speakers, attributed to a deficiency of fluorine in the waters of Castile and León. To assess this hypothesis, hydrological analyses were conducted in both Castile and Aragón. The results indicated no significant differences in the fluoride content of the waters in these regions, challenging Salvador's premise. In 1986, José Ramón Maruri from the University of Navarra responded critically to Salvador's theory. He pointed out that if the teeth of early Castilians were adversely affected by the water's composition, one would expect similar outcomes for the inhabitants of Alto Aragón. Maruri concluded that Salvador's hypothesis contained a significant flaw, highlighting inconsistencies in the argument:

== Conclusions ==
The existing theories regarding the phonetic shift from /f/ to [h] in Spanish have often oversimplified the issue. Researchers, whether proponents of substratist hypotheses or their critics, have tended to attribute the change to a single cause. However, linguistic changes are frequently the result of multiple factors, and the processes involved can be quite complex.

Proponents of the Basque substratum hypothesis have not thoroughly explained how this influence might have operated, nor have they considered other relevant circumstances. The term "substratum" may not be entirely appropriate, as it implies that the evolution occurred during the Roman period when Latin speakers first settled in the Iberian Peninsula. However, available documentation suggests that the sound change took place more definitively between the 8th and 10th centuries. It may be more accurate to refer to this influence as "adstratum" rather than "substratum".

Conversely, opponents of the substratum theories have often dismissed the potential impact of Basque–Romance bilingualism on phonetic change. Some researchers who argue that similar changes occurred elsewhere in Latin Europe fail to recognize that identical phonetic evolutions can arise from different causes in various contexts.

== See also ==
- History of the Spanish language
- Phonological history of Spanish coronal fricatives
- Latin

== Bibliography ==
- García-Lomas, Adriano (1966). El lenguaje popular de la Cantabria Montañesa. Fonética, recopilación de voces, juegos, industrias populares, refranes y modismos (in Spanish) (2th ed.). Santander: Aldus Artes Gráficas.
- Lloyd, Paul M. (1987). From Latin to Spanish: Historical phonology and morphology of the Spanish language. American Philosophical Society. ISBN 978-0-87169-173-6.
- Penny, Ralph (1993). Gramática histórica del español (in Spanish). Barcelona: Ariel. ISBN 84-344-8265-7.
- Trask, R. L. (1996). The History of Basque. pp. 426–427.
