= Benjamin Suchard =

Dutch linguist (born 1988)

Benjamin D. Suchard
- Citizenship: Dutch
- Education: PhD Linguistics and Hebrew & Aramaic, Leiden University. Research MA in Linguistics, Leiden University. BA in Comparative Indo-European Linguistics, Leiden University.
- Website: bnuyaminim.wordpress.com

Benjamin D. Suchard (born 1988) is a historical linguist specializing in the Semitic and Afroasiatic language families. His research focuses on phonological and morphological reconstruction, including the history of the reading traditions of the Hebrew Bible. After completing a postdoctoral contract at KU Leuven, he is now working at Universiteit Gent, working on the pre-Islamic Arabian inscriptions of al-Ula. He is known for applying the Neogrammarian hypothesis—focusing on regular and phonetically conditioned sound changes—to Semitic linguistics, which has historically under-emphasized this method. Besides his work as a linguist, he published a book on the Book of Daniel in 2022, in which he reconstructs what he believes was the original Biblical Aramaic text. His monograph on Daniel has received very positive feedback from the scholarship.

== Suchard's law ==
In his first book The Development of the Biblical Hebrew Vowels, Suchard resolved the longstanding irregularity of the Canaanite shift, whereby */ā/ shifted to /ō/ except in vicinity of /u/ or /w/. This led to the discovery of an early Hebrew sound change */u/ > /i/ next to labial consonants. This sound change subsequently became known as Suchard's law, joining a number of other sound changes named after their discoverers including Philippi's law, Pinault's law and Geers's law.

== Public engagement ==
Suchard made a name for himself with his public engagement, unusual in historical linguistics. He uses his Twitter and Bluesky accounts to engage with the public about Ancient Near Eastern languages. He has been involved as a language consultant in the production of major Hollywood films. Besides, Benjamin D. Suchard has featured in multiple YouTube videos, talking about various subjects such as the name of Jesus or introducing Semitic languages.

== Books ==
- Suchard B.D. (2022), Aramaic Daniel: a textual reconstruction of chapters 1-7. Studia Semitica Neerlandica no. 73. Leiden: Brill.
- Suchard B.D. (2019), The development of the Biblical Hebrew vowels. Studies in Semitic Languages and Linguistics no. 99. Leiden: Brill.
