= Vowel shift =

Systematic change in the pronunciation of the vowel sounds of a language

A vowel shift is a systematic sound change in the pronunciation of the vowel sounds of a language.

The best-known example in the English language is the Great Vowel Shift, which began in the 15th century. The Greek language also underwent a vowel shift near the beginning of the Common Era, which included iotacism. Among the Semitic languages, the Canaanite languages underwent a shift in which Proto-Semitic *ā became ō in Proto-Canaanite (a language likely very similar to Biblical Hebrew).

A vowel shift can involve a merger of two previously different sounds, or it can be a chain shift.

== US examples ==
One of the several major vowel shifts that is currently underway in the US is the Northern Cities Vowel Shift. This change pattern is characterized by the longer and lower vowels moving forward and upward, while the shorter vowels move downward and backward. This vowel rotation, for example, is noticeable as the vowel sound in "coffee" is moving toward the vowel in "father". While there are undoubtedly several other change patterns that define the shift in the Northern Cities, they are diffusing throughout the North in a unique manner, and are inherently different from dialect shifts taking place in other regions.

In addition to the Northern Cities Vowel Shift, the dialect change patterns that are taking place in the South also indicate pronunciation changes in the region. In contrast to the changes in the North, however, the Southern Vowel Shift is characterized by the shorter, front vowels moving upward and adopting the characteristics of traditionally longer vowels. To exemplify this Southern vowel change, the vowel in the word "bed" is commonly used, as the "e" moves upward and gains a glide and causes the word to be pronounced more like "bayd".

=== California English Vowel Shift ===
California Vowel Shift (CVS) has several identifying features. These include the low back vowel mergers of words such as bought and bot, fronting of back vowels /oʊ/ as in coat and /ʊ/ in nook or look, as well as that which is found in words such as loot or hoot. Another identifying feature of CVS is the raising or backing of the vowel /æ/ such as that found in cat, depending on its linguistic environment and whether it is pre-nasal or not. Since California is such a large state, and home to millions of people from diverse ethnic origins and backgrounds, California has seen vowel shifts within its own borders, allowing linguists to see phonological differences between Northern, Southern and Bay Area regions of California. While linguists recognize that not all native Californians have shifted their vowels to these placements within their speech acts, it is prevalent enough to recognize the chain shift that is occurring in the largest Western state.

==== Northern California Vowel Shift ====
In Northern California, there is a chain vowel shift occurring. Short front vowels that used to be higher are shifting to lower vowel spaces in native Northern California speech acts involving the vowels /i/, /ɛ/ and /æ/. Additionally, Northern California speech acts are centralizing the sound that occurs in words such as boat (/oʊ/). These shifts in vowel shortening and centralization, while not entirely unique to the region of Northern California natives, does represent the most obvious changes that are occurring within the area in regard to native speech acts.

==== Bay Area Vowel Shift ====
The region of California that includes the Silicon Valley and the populous cities of San Francisco, Oakland and San Jose utilizes the same speech vowel shifts as their native Northern California neighbors in regard to vowel shortening and centralization of the diphthong in words such as boat or coat. However, this area is uniquely influenced by the acoustic accouterments associated with the gay identity which include fronting of back vowels and merging vowel sounds found in words such as cot and caught. Native Bay Area residents tend to have a more intensive vowel shift in regard to the components that comprise CVS. These shifts include changes in voice and intonation.

=== Chicano English ===
Due to the increasing migration from multiple Latin American countries, especially from its southern neighbor Mexico, California is influenced in speech patterns and speech acts from this population. Changes in native California speech due to this influence include a shift from /ɪŋ/ to /iŋ/ in California English. These changes are most obvious in areas with large Latin American communities.

== Canadian Shift ==
=== Lowering of vowels and chain shifts ===
The Canadian Vowel Shift can be described to have a lot of systematic changes, however one of the main ones can be found in the lowering of /ɪ/, /ɛ/, /æ/. In the early stages of the Canadian shift there is a stabilizing in the retraction of the vowel /æ/. The first reported case of the vowels /ɪ/, /ɛ/, and /æ/ in Canadian English was involved in a chain shift, which can be described as the lowering of the front lax vowels over time.

=== Canadian Raising ===
There is another characteristic found in Canadian English called Canadian Raising. This feature includes the vowel diphthongs onsets of /aj/ and /aw/ raise to mid vowels when they precede voiceless obstruents (the sounds /p/, /t/, /k/, /s/, and /f/). Canadian pronunciation of "about" often sounds like "aboot", pronunciation of /aw/ is articulated with the tongue in a low position, and because it raises to a mid position in Canadian English when the vowel precedes the voiceless obstruents listed above. Speakers of other varieties of English will immediately detect the vowel raising, but will sometimes think that the vowel has raised farther than it actually does, all the way to /u/. The raised vowels /aɪ/ typically raises [ɐɪ], while the raised variant of /aʊ/ differs by dialects in Canada, with [ɐʊ~ʌʊ] more common in Western Canada and a fronted variant [əʊ~ɛʊ] is mostly heard in Central Canada. The open vowel component of the diphthongs changes to a mid vowel ([ʌ], [ɐ], [ɛ] or [ə]).

== Standard Southern British Shift ==
In recent decades, Standard Southern British (SSB) has undergone an "anti-clockwise" vowel shift. The front vowels are lower ([e] has lowered to [ɛ] and [æ] to [a]), the starting vowel of the /aɪ/ diphthong is backer (from [a] to [ɑ] or [ʌ]), back vowels are higher ([ɒ] has raised to [ɔ] and [ɔː] to [oː]) and [uː] has fronted and diphthongized to [ʉw].

== See also ==
- Great Vowel Shift
- Phonological history of English vowels
- California English
- Canaanite shift
- Canadian Shift
- Compensatory lengthening
- Fronting (sound change)
- Germanic a-mutation
- Germanic umlaut
- I-mutation
- Northern Cities Vowel Shift
- Palatalization (sound change)
- Quantitative metathesis
- Raising (sound change)
- Scottish vowel length rule
- Southern American English
- Trisyllabic laxing
- Vowel breaking
