= Phonological history of Scots =

This is a presentation of the phonological history of the Scots language.

Scots has its origins in Old English (OE) via early Northern Middle English; though loanwords from Old Norse and Romance sources are common, especially from ecclesiastical and legal Latin, Anglo-Norman and Middle French borrowings. Trade and immigration led to some borrowings from Middle Low German and Middle Dutch. Some vocabulary has also been borrowed from Scotland's other language, Scottish Gaelic.

== Consonants ==
=== Consonant clusters ===
Scots preserved OE /kn/ and /ɡn/ word-initially, though this feature is now highly recessive (e.g. knaw 'know', gnegum 'tricky nature'). Similarly, Scots retained /sk/ (e.g. OE sċylfe → skelf 'shelf'). Elsewhere, it tended to reduce consonant clusters. Instance of /b/ between /m/ and a following /l/ or /r/ were lost or did not develop, except in certain words like member, November, and December:

OE æmyrġe → Modern Scots emmers 'embers' (compare English /mb/)
OE þȳmel → Modern Scots thimmle 'thimble' (compare English /mb/)
OE timber → Modern Scots timmer 'timber'
French l'ambre → Modern Scots lammer (amber)
French chambre → Modern Scots chaumer (chamber)
Anglo-Norman noumbre → Modern Scots nummer (number)
OE tumbian → Modern Scots tummle (tumble)

Alveolar plosives /t/ and /d/ were dropped from final /kt/ (except in some inflected forms like act, expect, strict), /pt/, /nd/, /ld/, and medial /pt/: a

Latin strictus → Modern Scots strick 'strict'
Latin corruptus → Modern Scots corrup 'corrupt'
OE æmtig → Modern Scots empy 'empty'
OE frēond → Modern Scots freend 'friend' /frin(d)/
OE ald → Modern Scots auld 'old' /ɑːl(d)/

Old English /hw/ became /xw/ for a number of speakers, though /hw/ is widespread:

OE hwæt → Modern Scots whit 'what'

Metathesis occurred in some words.

OE græs → Modern Scots girse 'grass'

=== Elision ===
OE /f/ was often dropped in certain contexts:

OE delfan → Modern Scots del 'delve'
OE dēofol → Modern Scots deil 'devil'
OE dufe → Modern Scots dou 'dove'
OE ġiefan → Modern Scots gie 'give'

Word final OE /θ/ (written ⟨ð⟩ or ⟨þ⟩) was deleted in a few words

OE mūþ → Modern Scots mou 'mouth'

Though OE /x/ ⟨h⟩ is mostly preserved (spelled ⟨ch⟩), some words such as tho 'though' and throu 'through' have dropped the /x/:

OE beorht → Modern Scots bricht and English bright
OE hlōh → Modern Scots lauch and English laugh
OE þōht → Modern Scots thocht and English thought

=== Palatalisation ===
Old English /s/ palatalised to /ʃ/ when adjacent to a front vowel:

OE sinder → Modern Scots shinners 'cinder'

Scots did not undergo the palatisation of OE /k/ and /ɡ/ to /tʃ/ and /dʒ/ after a front vowel that occurred in English:

OE birċe → Scots birk 'birch'
OE brēċ → Scots breeks 'britches'
OE þæċ → Scots thack 'thatch'
OE ġiċċan → Scots yeuk 'itch'
OE hryċġ → Scots rig 'ridge'

=== Vocalisation ===
OE /ɡ/ became vocalised after /o/ resulting in the diphthong /ʌu/ (vowel 13) in Modern Scots.

OE boga → bowe 'bow'

Similarly, in the Early Scots period, /l/ was vocalized after /u/, /o/ (becoming /ou/ and then changing to /ʌu/), /a/ (becoming /ɑː/ and then changing to /ɑ/ or /ɔ/, depending on dialect):

OE pullian → Modern Scots pou 'pull'
OE bolster → Modern Scots bowster 'bolster'
OE healdan → Modern Scots haud 'hold'

== Vowels ==
The following table shows the modern realisation of the various Scots vowels along with their pronunciation in Early Scots, the Early Middle English vowels they can largely be derived from, and the main Old English or Old French sources of these vowels. See also Middle English phonology for a more in-depth overview of the Old English sources of the Early Middle English vowels below. External sources are: For the principal Old English, Norse and Romance sources of the Early Scots vowels see Aitken, A.J, (Ed. Macafee C.) (2002) pp. 89–95 (for an overview of the historical developments see Vowel systems of Scots: a rough historical outline in A History of Scots to 1700, p. lvii).

Long vowels
Vowel #	Spelling	Realisation	Early Scots	Early Middle English	Main Source(s)	Examples
1	⟨i.e, y.e, ey⟩	short /əi/ long /aɪ/	/iː/		OE ī, ȳ	mine ('mine')
2	⟨ee, e.e⟩	/i/	/eː/		OE ē, ēo	deed ('deed'), sene ('seen')
3	⟨ei, ea, e.e⟩	/i, e/	/ɛː/		OE ǣ, ēa	deid ('dead'), lene ('lean')
4	⟨ae, a.e⟩	/e/	/aː/		OE ā	bane ('bone')
5	⟨oa, o.e⟩	/o/	/oː/	/ɔː/	OE o (open)	cole ('coal')
6	⟨ou⟩	/u/	/uː/		OE ū	doun ('down')
7	⟨ui, eu⟩	/ø/	/øː/ (/yː/)	/oː/	OE ō	guid ('good'), beuk ('book')
Diphthongs
Vowel #	Spelling	Realisation	Early Scots	Early Middle English	Main Source(s)	Examples
8	⟨ai, ay⟩	/eː/	/ai/	/ai/, /ɛi/	OE a, æ (open); OF ai, ei	pain ('pain')
9	⟨oi, oy⟩	/oe/	/oi/		OF oi /ɔi/	noise ('noise')
10	⟨oi, oy⟩	/əi/	/ui/		OF oi /oi/	point ('point')
11	⟨ee⟩	/iː/	/ei/		OE eġ	ee ('eye')
12	⟨au, aw⟩	/ɑː, ɔː/	/au/		OE ag, aw	law ('law')
13	⟨ow, owe⟩	/ʌu/	/ou/	/ɔu/, /ou/	OE og, ow	lown ('calm')
14a	⟨ew⟩	/ju/	/iu/	/eu/, /iu/	OE iw, ew	spew ('spew')
14b	⟨ew⟩	/ju, jʌu/	/ɛu, ɛou/	/ɛu/	OE ǣw, ēaw	dew ('dew')
Short vowels
Vowel #	Spelling	Realisation	Early Scots	Early Middle English	Main Source(s)	Examples
15	⟨i⟩	/ɪ/	/ɪ/		OE i, y	pin ('pin')
16	⟨e⟩	/ɛ/	/ɛ/		OE a, æ + alveolar	men ('men')
17	⟨a⟩	/ɑ, a/	/a/		OE a, æ (closed); OE o + labial	man ('man')
18	⟨o⟩	/ɔ/	/o/		OE o (closed)	fon ('folly')
19	⟨u⟩	/ʌ/	/u/		OE u	gun

=== Vowel 1 ===
Old English and Old Norse ī and ȳ, Old English i+ld and y+nd, as well as Old French i became /iː/ in Early Scots then /ei/ in Middle Scots and subsequently conditioned by the Scottish Vowel Length Rule to /əi/ when short and /aɪ/ or /ɑɪ/ when long in Modern Scots, for example: wyce (wise), wyte (blame), bide (remain), kye (cows), hive and fire from wīs, wīte, bīdan, cȳ, hȳf and fȳr. Similarly with Norse grice (pig), sile (strain), tyke (curr), lythe (shelter) and tyne (lose), and Romance advice, fine, cry, sybae (onion) but where Romance words entered Scots after this sound shift the original /i/ (Vowel 2) remained in Scots, for example bapteese (baptise), ceety (city), ceevil (civil), eetem (item), leeberal (liberal), leecence (license), meenister (minister), obleege (oblige), peety (pity), poleetical (political), poseetion, releegion (religion) and speerit (spirit).

Similarly with Old French ai and ei, for example Modern Scots chyce (choice), eynment (ointment), eyster (oyster), evyte (avoid), jyne (join), ile (oil), pynt (point), syle (soil), spyle (spoil) and vyce (voice)

=== Vowel 2 ===
Old English ē became /eː/ in Early Scots then /iː/ in Middle Scots and /i/ in Modern Scots, for example: bee, breest breast, cheese, creep, deed, freend (friend), hear, heich (high), knee, seek (sick), sheep, sleep, teeth and wheen a few from bēo, brēost, ċēse, crēap, dēd, frēond, hēran, hēah, cnēo, sēoc, sċēp, slēp, tēþ and hwēne. Also grieve (overseer) from grœfa.

=== Vowel 3 ===
Old English ea and ēa became /ɛː/ in Early Scots, merging with vowel 2 (/i/) or vowel 4 (/e/) in Middle Scots depending on dialect or lexeme, except for a few Northern Scots dialects where it became /ɛi/, for example Modern Scots: beard, breid (bread), deid (dead), deif (deaf), heid (head), meat (food), steid (stead) and tread from beard, brēad, dēad, dēaf, hēafod, mete, stede and tredan. Similarly with Romance words like beast, cheat, conceit, creitur (creature), deceit, ease, please, ream (cream), reison and seison.

=== Vowel 4 ===
Old English ā became /a:/ in Early Scots then /eː/ in Middle Scots and /e/ in Modern Scots, for example: aik (oak), ait (oat), braid (broad), gae (go), hale (whole), hame (home), lade (load), mair (more), raip (rope), saip (soap), sair (sore) and nae (no) from āc, āte, brād, gā, hāl, hām, lād, māra, rāp, sāp and nā.

Before /n/, now /e/ in Modern central, southern and Ulster varieties and /i/ in northern varieties, for example: ane (one), ance (once), bane (bone), gane (gone), nane (none) and stane (stone) from ān, ānes, bān, gān, nān and stān. Similarly with Norse, for example frae (from), kail (cole) and spae (foretell) from frá, kál and spá. The vowel /e/ occurs in other words of Norse origin, for example graith (harness), hain (spare) and lair (mud) from greiða, hagna and leir.

Before /r/ + consonant, depending on dialect, now /e/ or /ɛ/ in Modern Scots, for example: airm (arm), airae (arrow), bairn (child), dairn (darn), hairm (harm), hairst (harvest), wairm (warm) and shairp (sharp) from earm, arwe, derne, hearm, hærfest, wearm and sċearp. Similarly with aiple (apple), aix (axe), efter (after), peth (path), and wraith (wrath) from æpel, æx, æfter, pæþ and wræþþu. Similarly with Romance caird (card), cairy (carry), gairden (garden), regaird (regard), mairy (marry), mairtyr (martyr) and pairt (part).

=== Vowel 5 ===
In open position o became /o̞ː/ in Early Scots then eventually /o/ in Modern Scots, for example: coal, foal, hole and thole endure.

=== Vowel 6 ===
Old English ū became /uː/ in Early Scots then /u/ in Middle Scots, remaining so but Stem final it became /ʌu/ in Southern Scots, for example Modern Scots: brou (brow), broun (brown), cou (cow), dou (dove), doun (down), house (house), hou (how), mou (mouth), mouse (mouse), nou (now), sour (sour) and thoum (thumb) from brū, brūn, cū, dūfe, dūn, hūs, hū, mūþ, mūs, nū, sūr and þūma. Similarly with Norse boun (ready), couer (cower), droup (droop) and stroup (spout), and Romance allou (allow), bouat (lantern), count (count), dout (doubt), pouder (powder) and round (round).

==== Vowel 6a ====
Older Scots /u̞l/ became vocalised to /u/ by the Middle Scots period, for example Modern Scots: fou (full), pou (pull) and oo (wool) from full, pullian and wull. Similarly Romance coum (culm) and poupit (pulpit).

=== Vowel 7 ===
Old English ō, ēo became /øː/ in Early Scots becoming /ø/ in Modern peripheral dialects. In Fife and parts of Perthshire Middle Scots /øː/ merged with vowel 4 (/e/). In Modern central varieties it has merged with vowel 15 (/ɪ/) in short environments conditioned by the Scottish Vowel Length Rule, for example: bluid (blood), duin (done), muin (moon) and spuin (spoon) from dōn, blōd, mōna, and spōn. Similarly with Romance words like bruit (brute), fruit, schuil (school), tuin (tune), uiss (use n.).

In central varieties Middle Scots /øː/ merged with vowel 4 (/eː/) in long environments conditioned by the Scottish Vowel Length Rule, for example Modern Scots: buird (board), fuird (ford), fluir (floor) and muir (moor) from bōrd, fōrd, flōr and mōr along with dae (do), shae (shoe) and tae (to) from dō, scō and tō. Similarly with Norse words like Fuirsday (Thursday), luif (palm) and ruise (praise), and Romance words like puir (poor), shuir (sure), uise (use v.).

In northern varieties Middle Scots /øː/ merged with vowel 2 (/i/), in Mid Northern varieties after /ɡ/ and /k/ it became /wi/, for example Modern Scots: guid (good), cuil (cool), from gōd, cōl and Dutch cuit (ankle), and Romance schuil (school). Note: But not Modern Scots fit (foot), wid (wood), wad (would), oo (wool), coud (could) and shoud/su(l)d (should).

A following /k/ or /x/ resulted in Modern Scots /ju/, /u/, /jʌ/ and/or /ʌ/ depending on dialect, for example: beuch (bough), beuk (book), ceuk (cook), eneuch (enough), heuch (cliff), heuk (hook), leuch (laughed), leuk (look), pleuch (plough), sheuch (ditch), teuch (tough) and teuk (took) from bōh, bōc, cōc, ġenóh, hōh, hōc, hlōh, tōc, plōh, sōh, tōh and tōc.

=== Vowel 8 ===
Old English a or æ in open position became /ai/ in Early Scots then /ɛ/ in Middle Scots and subsequently /e̞ː/, /e/ or /eə/ in Modern Scots, though /ɛː/ may also occur, especially in Ulster, for example: faither (father), gaither (gather), haimer (hammer), day, brain, fair, nail and tail from fæþer, gaderian, hamer, dæġ, bræġen, fæġer, næġel and tæġel. Similarly with Norse cake, gate (street), sale and scaith (damage).

==== Vowel 8a ====
Older Scots stem final /ai/ became /ɛi/ in Middle Scots merging with vowel 1 (/əi/) in Modern Scots.

=== Vowel 9 ===
Older Scots /o̞i/ became /oe/ in Modern Scots.

=== Vowel 10 ===
Early Scots /ui/ merged with vowel 1 (/əi/) in Modern Scots.

=== Vowel 11 ===
Early Scots /ei/ in stem final positions, became /eː/ then /iː/ in Middle Scots merging with vowel 2 (/i/) in Modern Scots.

=== Vowel 12 ===
Old English ag-, aw- and āw became /au/ in Early Scots then /ɑː/ in Middle Scots and subsequently, depending on dialect, /ɑ/ or /ɔ/ in Modern Scots, for example: draw, gnaw, and law from dragan, gnagan, haga and lagu, and Norse maw (seagull) and claw from maga and clawa. blaw (blow), craw (crow), maw (mowe), sawe (sow), saul (soul) and snaw (snow) from blāwan, crāwe, māwan, sāwan, sāwol and snāwan. Similarly with Old English āg and Norse lágr which became awn (to own) and law (low).

Before /x/ and /n/ + consonant, Middle Scots /a/ also became /ɑ/ or /ɔ/ in Modern Scots, for example: caunle (candle), draucht (draught), haund (hand), lauch (laugh), saund (sand) and slauchter (slaughter) from candel, draht, hand, hlæhhan, sand and slæ. Similarly with Norse baund (band), Dutch fraucht (freight), and Romance chancy, glanders, graund, and stank (a drain).

==== Vowel 12a ====
Older Scots /al/ became vocalised to /ɑː/ by the Middle Scots period and subsequently, depending on dialect, /ɑ/ or /ɔ/ in Modern Scots, for example: aw (all), caw (call), fauch (fallow), faw (fall), gaw (gall), haud (hold), haw (hall), maut (malt), sauch (sallow), saut (salt), smaw (small), staw (stall) and waw (wall) from eal, ceallian, fealh, fallan, gealla, healdan, hall, mealt, salh, sealt, smæl, steall and wall. Similarly with Norse hause (neck) and Romance aum (alum), baw (ball) and scaud (scald).

=== Vowel 13 ===
Old English ów became /o̞u/ in Older Scots then /ʌu/ in Modern Scots, for example: flowe (flow), glowe (glow), growe (grow) and stowe (stow) from flōwan, glōwan, grōwan and stówiġan.

==== Vowel 13a ====
Early Scots /ol/ became vocalised to /o̞u/ by the Middle Scots period and subsequently diphthongised to /ʌu/ in Modern Scots. In some dialects this is vocalising to /o/ especially before /k/, for example Modern Scots: bowster (bolster), bowt (bolt), cowt (colt), gowd (gold), howe (hollow), knowe (knoll), powe (poll) and towe (toll) from bolster, bolt, colt, gold, holh, cnol, polle and toll. Similarly with Romance rowe (roll) and sowder (solder), also Dutch gowf (golf).

=== Vowel 14 ===
Older Scots /iːu/ (a) and Older Scots /ɛːu/ (b(i)) became /iu/ in Middle Scots then /iu/ or /(j)u/ in Modern Scots.

==== Vowel 14b(ii) ====
Older Scots /ɛo̞u/ became /iuu/ in Middle Scots then /(j)ʌu/ in Modern Scots.

=== Vowel 15 ===
Old English i and y became /ɪ/ in Early Scots, remaining so, but approach /ʌ/ in some Modern dialects especially after /w/ and /hw/, for example Modern Scots: hill, filthy, will, win, wind, whip, whisper and whisky.

=== Vowel 16 ===
Before alveolars Old English æ became /ɛ/ in Early Scots, remaining so, for example Modern Scots: bress (brass), clesp (clasp), ess (ash), fest (fast), gled (glad), gless (glass), gress (grass) and hesp (hasp) from bræs, claspe, æsċe, fæst, glæd, glæs, gæs and hæpse.

=== Vowel 17 ===
Old English a or æ in close position became /a/ in Older Scots, remaining so, although /ɑ/ or /ɒ/ occasionally occur, for example Modern Scots: back, bath, blad (leaf/blade), cat, clap, hack, mak (make), ram, rax (stretch), tak (take), wall (well for water), wash, watter (water) and waps (wasp) from bæc, bæþ, blæd, catt, clappian, haccian, macian, ram, raxan, tacan, wælla, wæsċan, wæter, and wæps. Similarly with Norse bag, flag (flagstone) and snag and Dutch pad (path).

Also before /n/ and /ŋ/, for example Modern Scots: can, lang (long), man, pan, sang (song), sank, strang (strong), than (then) and wran (wren) from cann, lang, mæn, panne, sang, sanc, strang, þanne and wrænna. Similarly with Norse bann (curse), stang (sting), thrang (busy) and wrang (wrong).

Similarly with Old English o before /m/, /p/, /b/ and /f/, for example Modern Scots: craft (croft), crap (crop), drap (drop), laft (loft), pat (pot), saft (soft) and tap (top) from croft, cropp, dropa, loft, pott, softe and top.

Similarly with a w before e, for example Modern Scots: wab (web), wast (west), wadge (wedge), twal (twelve) and dwall (dwell) from web, west, weċġ, twelf and dwellan.

=== Vowel 18 ===
Old English o in close position became /o̞/ in Older Scots then /o/ in Modern Scots but in some dialects became /ɔ/, for example: box, lock and rock.

=== Vowel 19 ===
Old English u became /u̞/ in Early Scots then /ʌ/ in Modern Scots, for example but and cut, but in some words it merged with vowel 15 (/ɪ/), for example Modern Scots: din (dun), hinnie (honey), simmer (summer), son and nit (nut) from dunn, huniġ, sumor, sunne and hnut. Similarly in some Romance words, for example Modern Scots: kimmer (commère), kiver (cover), ingan (onion), stibble (stubble) and tribble (trouble).

=== Word endings ===
Various Old English word endings became any of /ɪ/, /i/, /a/, /ɑ/, /e/, or /ə/ depending on dialect, for example Modern Scots: borrae (borrow), follae (follow), marrae (marrow), meidae (meadow), pillae (pillow), sheddae (shadow), swallae (swallow), weedae (widow) and yallae (yellow) from borgian, folgian, mearh, maedwe, pyle, sċeadu, swelgan/swealwe, widwe and ġeolo. Similarly with Norse windae (window).

== See also ==
- History of the Scots language
