= Analogical change =

Linguistic concept

In language change, analogical change occurs when one linguistic sign is changed in either form or meaning to reflect another item in the language system on the basis of analogy or perceived similarity. In contrast to regular sound change, analogy is driven by idiosyncratic cognitive factors and applies irregularly across a language system. This leads to what is known as Sturtevant's paradox: sound change is regular, but produces irregularity; analogy is irregular, but produces regularity.

== Analogy in child language acquisition ==
Analogy plays an important role in child language acquisition. The relationship between language acquisition and language change is well established, and while both adult speakers and children can be innovators of morphophonetic and morphosyntactic change, analogy used in child language acquisition likely forms one major source of analogical change.

During the acquisition of grammatical change, children are prone to overregularization, in which the children extends a particular grammatical rule to apply to irregular forms by analogy, such as created forms such as mans and mouses for the plural of man and mouse on the basis of the regular English plural. If this overregularization becomes established in the child's grammar and is adopted by many speakers, it would lead to analogical change in the form of leveling.

== Types of analogical change ==
Analogical change does not represent a single process, but rather a family of different language change processes which all follow the general principle of irregularly changing one form to 'match' another form or a pattern observed among several other forms.

=== Proportional analogy ===
Proportional analogy or four-part analogy is the simplest form of analogical change, representing the change or introduction of a form on the basis of analogy with a pattern that can be expressed by a single form. This type of analogical change is often diagrammatized with a proportion, in which rows represent paradigms while columns represent dimensions of similarity. Thus, for example, the analogy which generated flammable from inflammable on the basis of the pattern of in- prefixes could summarised as a proportional analogy with the following proportion:

$$\begin{matrix} inarticulate & : & articulate \\ inflammable & : & ? \end{matrix}$$

where the <?> represents the new, albeit overregularized form, flammable, with both inflammable and flammable having the same meaning.

=== Creation, maintenance and restoration ===
Analogical creation refers to cases when analogy creates a new word or form of a word. The example of flammable, having the same meaning as inflammable, is an example of analogical creation, as the word flammable has been created and added to the language system.

Analogical maintenance occurs when a regular sound change is prevented from occurring on the basis of analogy. In completed changes, this is indiscernible from analogical restoration, in which a regular sound change is reversed on the basis of analogy. An example of analogical maintenance would be the perseverance of /w/ in swollen by analogy with the present tense swell (contrast with sword, where the /w/ is lost by regular sound change).

=== Leveling ===
Leveling involves the elimination of alternations within a paradigm. This typically occurs when a particular variation no longer signals an important morphological distinction. For example, Old English (OE) distinguished past singular and past plural forms of the verb ceosan, ceas and curon respectively, but these were leveled to give a single Modern English (LME) past, chose.

=== Contamination ===
Contamination refers to analogical change wherein a particular form influences the pronunciation of a semantically related form, without bringing about any change in the meaning of that form. An example of contamination may be seen in the change from Middle English (ME) male/femelle > LME male/female.

=== Recomposition, folk etymology, and hypercorrection ===
Recomposition and folk etymology are related processes that assign transparent compound structure to previously simple words. The two kinds of change are differentiated by the fact that the former accurately reconstructs some previous form of complex structure of the word, while the latter imposes an analysis of the word which was never accurate. An example of recomposition is the change from OE hūs-wīf 'house-wife' > hussif (> 'hussy') > LME house-wife.

Hypercorrections may also become established in a language, leading to a further kind of analogical change. An example of a change resulting from hypercorrection would be the change of ME autor > LME author on the basis of perceived similarity to ME trone > LME throne, the latter in turn being an analogical change on the basis of the Greek thronos.

== Examples of analogical change ==
=== Phonology ===
Leveling analogical change can occur in sound change when some forms in a given paradigm provide a correct environment for a change, and with forms which do not provide the correct environment for the sound change being modified to exemplify the same changes. This kind of change may be exemplified from vowel changes in Old English, where forms such as whale (from OE hwæl) take a long vowel rather than the short vowel expected by regular sound change due to the vowel being lengthened in other forms in the same paradigm (in this case, the plural whales, cf. staff/staves).

=== Morphology ===
Analogical change in morphology involves changing the items in one inflectional paradigm to fit with the pattern observed in another on the basis of phonological similarities. This may be exemplified in English by the plural of octopus. This is a Greek borrowed word, and so should take a plural form octopodes. However, English has many nouns of Latin origin with singular forms ending -us and plural forms ending -i, such as cactus/cacti, radius/radii, etc. Thus, an analogical proportion can be established:

$$\begin{matrix} cactus & : & cacti \\ octopus & : & ? \end{matrix}$$

On the basis of this analogy, the plural octopi is established. (Some varieties may have octopuses instead, which is instead derived from the productive plural rule of English morphology.)

== See also ==
- Sound change
- Language change
- Language acquisition
- Morphological leveling
- Folk etymology
- Hypercorrection
