= Jürgen Handke =

German linguist

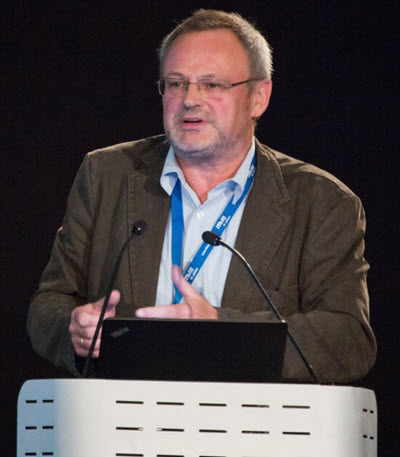
- Jürgen Handke talking about digital, interactive and innovative teaching methods at St Pölten University, Austria
- Born: 13 April 1954 (age 72); Hannover, Germany
- Education: Leibniz University Hannover; University of Reading
- Awards: Hessian Teaching and Learning Award for the Inverted Classroom Mastery Model (2013), Ars Legendi Prize for Digital Teaching and Learning (2015)
- Scientific career
- Fields: Linguistics

Jürgen Handke (born 13 April 1954) is a German professor of English linguistics.

== Life ==
Handke originally studied English, sports, and philosophy to become a teacher at Universität Hannover from 1975 to 1980 and did his postgraduate in linguistics at the University of Reading from 1981 to 1983.

He was a research assistant in Hannover from 1981 to 1984. In 1984, Handke did his Ph.D., writing his dissertation on adverbial clauses in English.

From 1984 to 1991 Handke was a research assistant at Universität Wuppertal, where he wrote his habilitation dissertation Natural Language Processing and Implementation in LISP under the supervision of Gisa Rauh in 1990.

Since 1991, Handke has been working as a professor of English at Philipps-Universität Marburg. His focus is on linguistics and e-learning.

Additionally, Handke is an advisor to several German state governments and a member of the national board "Hochschulforum Digitalisierung".

== Virtual Linguistics Campus ==
Handke began to use digital and interactive teaching methods in the form of CD-ROMs in the early 1990s. This method of teaching resulted in the creation of the world's first and largest e-learning platform for linguistics, the Virtual Linguistics Campus (VLC). Currently, there are 94 courses on the VLC platform.

The VLC offers a wide variety of courses on linguistics, ranging from introductory to more advanced material.

In 2017, Handke started integrating humanoid robots into his in-class scenarios as part of the project. As an example, the robot called Yuki helps Handke with his lectures at university.

== Music ==
Alongside his academic work, Handke is also a musician and has been playing music since his early teenage years. In the 1970s, he played with Matthias Jabs (later Scorpions) and Hannes Folberth (later Eloy) amongst others in a band called Deadlock. The band split in 1977 because Handke decided to solely focus on linguistics and went to England.

== Selected publications ==
- Handke, Jürgen (2000). The Mouton Interactive Introduction to Phonetics and Phonology. Berlin: Mouton de Gruyter. ISBN 3-11-016812-X. OCLC 46724656.
- Handke, Jürgen (2000). Die interaktive Einführung in die Linguistik 2.0 ein interaktiver Kurs für Studierende der Sprachwissenschaften (in German). Ismaning: Hüber. ISBN 3-19-001653-4. OCLC 76104721.
