= Slavic palatalization =

Slavic palatalization may refer to:

- Slavic first palatalization, the first palatalization affecting the Slavic languages
- Slavic second palatalization, the second palatalization affecting the Slavic languages
- Slavic third palatalization or progressive palatalization in Common Slavic
