= New Orleans English =

Dialect and accent of American English

New Orleans English is American English native to the city of New Orleans and its metropolitan area. Native English speakers of the region actually speak a number of varieties, including the variety most recently brought in and spreading since the 20th century among white communities of the Southern United States in general (Southern U.S. English); the variety primarily spoken by black residents (African-American Vernacular English); the variety spoken by Cajuns in southern Louisiana (Cajun English); the variety traditionally spoken by affluent white residents of the city's Uptown and Garden District; and the variety traditionally spoken by lower middle- and working-class white residents of Eastern New Orleans, particularly the Ninth Ward (sometimes known, since at least the 1980s, as Yat). However, only the last two varieties are unique to New Orleans and are typically those referred to in the academic research as "New Orleans English". These two varieties specific to New Orleans likely developed around the turn of the 19th century and most noticeably combine speech features commonly associated with both New York City English and, to a lesser extent, Southern U.S. English. The noticeably New York-like characteristics include the NYC-like short-a split (so that mad and map, for example, do not have the same vowel), non-rhoticity, th-stopping (so that, for example, "those" may sound like "doze"), and the recently disappearing coil–curl merger. Noticeably Southern characteristics include the fronting of /oʊ/ and possible monophthongization of /aɪ/ (just these features, plus non-rhoticity, often characterize the Uptown accent).

Often, the term "Yat" refers particularly to the New Orleans accents that are "strongest" or most especially reminiscent of a working-class New York City accent, though others use the term as a regional marker, to define the speech heard in certain parts of the city and its inner suburbs. Used in these narrower senses, Yat is simply one of many sub-dialects of New Orleans. The word comes from the common use of the local greeting, "Where y'at?" or "Where are you at (i.e. in life)?", which is a way of asking, "How are you?"

== History ==
A unique New Orleans accent, or "Yat" accent, is considered an identity marker of white metropolitan people who have been raised in the greater New Orleans area. English professor Allan A. Metcalf discusses that "Yats" mostly live near the Irish Channel in blue-collar neighborhoods. The dialect's connotation with the working-class white population therefore encodes the speaker's identities.

The striking similarity between the New Orleans Yat accent and the accent of the New York metropolitan area has been the subject of much speculation. Plausible origins of the accent are described in A. J. Liebling's book The Earl of Louisiana, in a passage that was used as a foreword to A Confederacy of Dunces, John Kennedy Toole's well-known posthumously published novel about New Orleans:

There is a New Orleans city accent ... associated with downtown New Orleans, particularly with the German and Irish Third Ward, that is hard to distinguish from the accent of Hoboken, Jersey City, and Astoria, Long Island, where the Al Smith inflection, extinct in Manhattan, has taken refuge. The reason, as you might expect, is that the same stocks that brought the accent to Manhattan imposed it on New Orleans.

In the decades following the 1803 Louisiana Purchase, when New Orleans changed from being a French colonial possession to an American city, Irish, German, and eventually Italian (largely Sicilian) immigrants indeed began populating the city. However, rather than believing the New York and New Orleans dialects evolved similarly merely due to a similar mixture of European immigrant populations, modern linguists believe that the dialect histories of New Orleans and New York City actually have a direct relationship: significant commercial and demographic interactions between the two cities. Although exact linguistic theories vary, the broad consensus is that key New York accent features probably diffused to New Orleans by the late 19th century. Large-scale movements (permanent or seasonal) of working-class, lower middle-class, and merchant-class Northeastern Americans of European immigrant families to New Orleans may have brought along their native Northeastern (namely, New York City) accent features. Even during the antebellum era, Northerners made up over a quarter of all free, white, non-immigrant residents of New Orleans. Linguist William Labov specifically argues that Jewish American bankers and cotton merchants strongly affiliated with New York City were the biggest influence on upper-class accents (and presumably, the eventual accents of all classes) in New Orleans. He cites examples of Sephardic and German Jewish connections to influential mercantile firms in 19th-century New Orleans.

== Phonology ==
Many of the features bear a direct relation to Southern American English or New York City English, when not common across the United States more broadly. Of the "Yat" dialect features, the most distinct ones are:

- No cot–caught merger, as in regional American accents. There is a father–bother merger, but the merged /ɑ/ becomes [ɒ] or [ɔ] in rhotic environments.
- Stressed /ɔ/ and /ɑ/ becoming [ɔə] or [ɒə] (i.e., 'God,' 'on,' 'talk', become [ɡɔəd], [ɔən], and [tɔək], respectively).
- Non-rhoticity; 'heart' and 'fire' become [hɔət] and [ˈfaɪə], respectively.
  - The coil–curl merger: phonemes /ɔɪ/ and /ɝ/, creating the diphthong [ɜɪ], before a consonant. The feature has receded, but not as much as in New York City. Sometimes, the exact opposite occurs, the full rhotacization of a syllable-internal /ɔɪ/ (i.e. 'toilet,' becomes [ˈtɝlɪt]); this is more typical in men than in women.
- Th-stopping, pronouncing the "th" sounds like 't' or 'd'.
- A variable horse–hoarse merger
- /ɪn/ or /ən/ used for unstressed and final /ɪŋ/. this makes 'running' sound like 'runnin'.
- Splitting the historic 'short a' vowel into tense [eə] and lax [æ] versions. New Orleans' system most closely resembles New York City's, but also applies to voiced fricatives and function words.
- /aɪ/-monophthongization, resulting in [aː]. this is common to many Southeastern United States accents.
  - However, the Canadian raising of both /aɪ/ and /aʊ/ can also be heard among younger speakers
- Shifting the stress of some words, such as "insurance", to the first syllable. This also occurs in the broader Southeastern United States, and many forms of AAVE.

There are some words with phonemic peculiarities, but according to no particular pattern; including 'sink' /ziŋk/, 'room' /ɻʊm/, 'mayonnaise' /ˈmeɪnæz/, 'museum' /mjuˈzɛəm/, 'ask' /æks/.

New Orleans is locally pronounced [nəˈwɔəlɪnz] or [nəˈwɔəliənz], with the "New" destressed. The slurred, stereotypical "N'awlins" [nɔəlɪnz] and the General American [nu ɔɻˈlinz] are not often heard from natives. Louisiana can be pronounced as the standard [luˈiziænə] or a slightly reduced [ləˈwiziænə] in the 'Yat' dialect.

Black New Orleanians adopt most features of the African-American Vowel Shift, which they share with Black residents of Acadiana. Compared with Black New Iberians though, Black New Orleanians had in-gliding /i, u/ and less diphthongized /o/.

== Vocabulary ==
=== Everyday and cultural terms ===
- Y’at? – “How are you?” Short for Where y’at?
- Lagniappe – A little something extra, a bonus.
- Making groceries – Grocery shopping.
- Neutral ground – The median between traffic lanes.
- Uptown / Downtown – Directional. Not “nice vs rough,” but Upriver or Downriver, so "Downtown" would simply mean that a location is be more toward the river's mouth.
- Riverside / Lakeside – Directional. Means that the location is either nearer to Lake Pontchartrain or the Mississippi River.
- West Bank – Across the river, culturally distinct.
- Parish – County.
- Shotgun house – Narrow house, rooms in a straight line.

=== Food and drink language ===
- Po' boy – Dressed means lettuce, tomato, pickles, mayo.
- All dat – Everything on it.
- Yakamein – Creole noodle soup, often a hangover cure.
- Sno-ball – Shaved ice that is shaved so fine it is fluffy, almost like fresh snow, then drenched in flavored syrup so it absorbs instead of pooling at the bottom.
- Daiquiri – Often frozen, often to-go, and stronger than expected.
- Red beans – Usually means red beans and rice, traditionally Monday food.

=== Music, Mardi Gras and street culture ===
- Second line (parades) – By definition, this is the group that would follow the "Main Line" or "First Line", however, in New Orleans, these have become an entirely separate entity, with a subculture and celebratory style unto themselves.
- Social Aid & Pleasure Club – Community organizations that throw second lines.
- Bounce – Local hip-hop style.
- Indian / Mardi Gras Indian – Known for their elaborate beaded costumes. They preserve a cultural resistance when Black Americans were not allowed to partake in Mardi Gras celebrations. Participants are often of Indigenous descent paying homage to the Native Americans who assisted their ancestors by taking them into their tribes due to them being runaway slaves.
- Masking – Dressing in Mardi Gras regalia.
- Throw me something, mister! – Yelled at parade riders.
- Krewe – Organization that puts on parades.

=== Attitude and expression ===
- Who dat – Saints pride, identity, greeting, declaration.
- You hear me / You heard me / "Yaherrme" – A forceful, emotive expression used as a final punctuation to emphasize a previous statement, ensure understanding, or signal impatience. Often confrontational but may also be used in casual conversation amongst friends.
- Baby / Cher / Sha – Terms of address, not romantic by default.
- Yeah you right – Agreement, resignation, or polite dismissal depending on tone.
- I'm on the way – Could mean “leaving now” or “still getting dressed.”

== Local variance ==
The Yat accent is the most pronounced version of the New Orleans accent, and is perceptually similar to a New York accent. As with all dialects, there is variance in the accent to geographic and social factors like one's exact locational or financial background.

Speakers of this dialect originated in the Ninth Ward, as well as the Irish Channel and Mid-City. Lighter features of the dialect can be heard in some parts of the city, such as Lakeview, the Marigny, the Garden District, and some parts of Gentilly, but mainly in the suburbs. The dialect is present to some degree in all seven parishes that make up the New Orleans metropolitan area, from St. Tammany to Plaquemines. As with many sociolinguistic artifacts in the 21st century, the dialect is usually more distinct among older members of the population. The New Orleans suburban area of Chalmette shows the strongest Yat accent.

== In popular culture ==
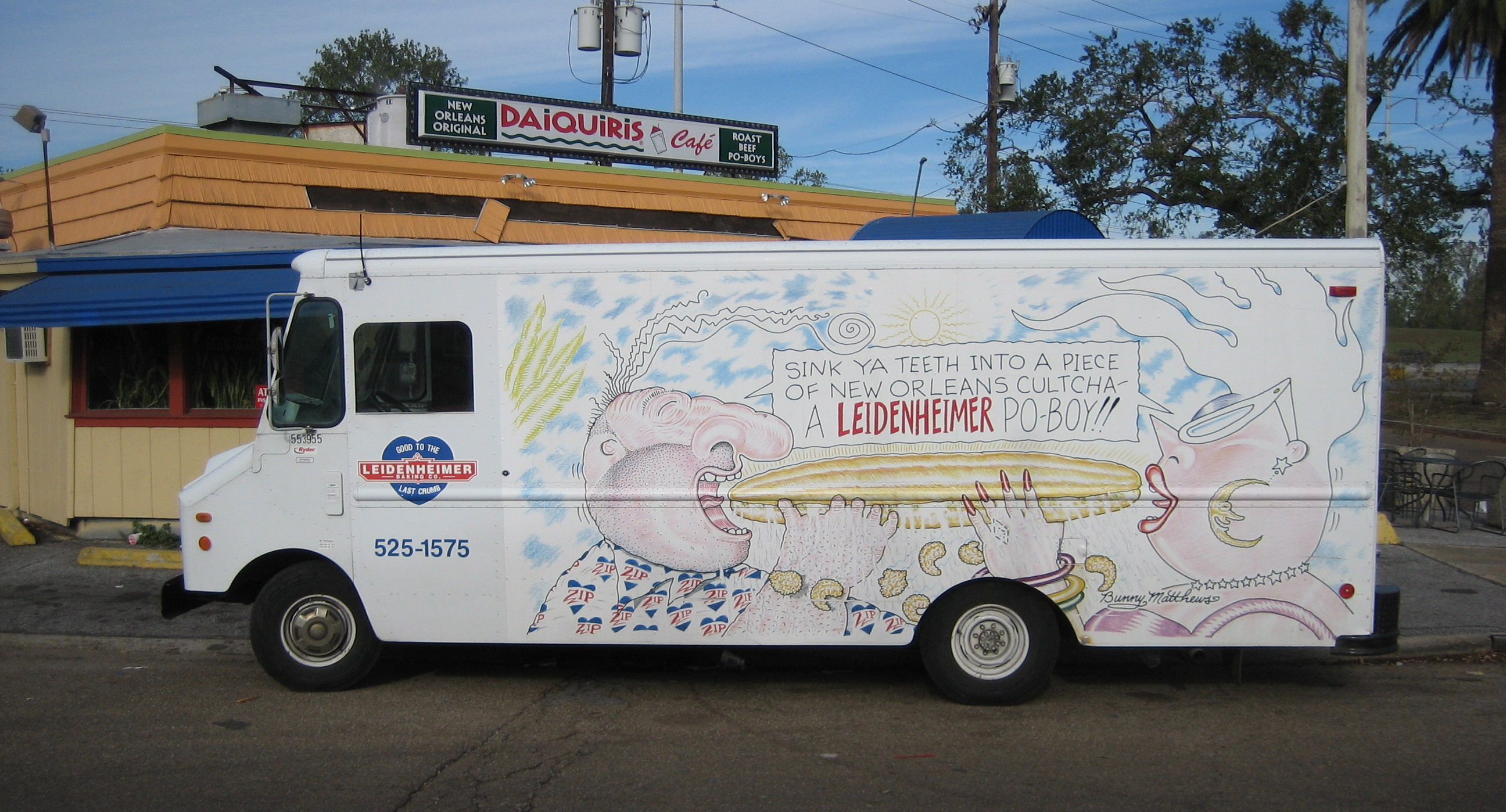
The characters "Vic & Nat'ly" by local cartoonist Bunny Matthews are what some might call Yats.

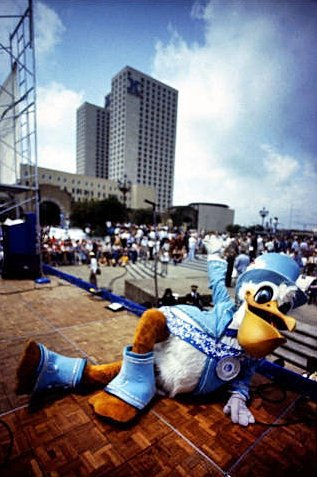
Seymore D. Fair; his name is a Yat derivative.

The name of the official mascot for the 1984 Louisiana World Exposition, held in New Orleans, was derived from the truncated pronunciation of "See More of the Fair," which results in the pseudo yat speak "Seymore D. Fair".

The distinct New Orleans dialect has been depicted in many ways throughout the city and the U.S.

The main character of the cartoon strip Krazy Kat spoke in a slightly exaggerated phonetically-rendered version of early-20th century Yat; friends of the New Orleans-born cartoonist George Herriman recalled that he spoke with many of the same distinctive pronunciations.

Actual New Orleans accents were seldom heard nationally. New Orleanians who attained national prominence in the media often made an effort to tone down or eliminate the most distinctive local pronunciations. Dan Baum's Nine Lives shares the feelings of Ronald Lewis, a native of the Ninth Ward who is embarrassed by his local dialect when speaking in front of a group of white northerners. After the displacement of Greater New Orleans area residents because of Hurricane Katrina, the United States was introduced to some of the New Orleans Yat accents by constant news coverage. Steven Seagal's show Lawman exposed some Yat accents and dialects to the nation.

Ronnie Virgets, a New Orleans writer, commentator, and journalist, employs New Orleans dialects and accents in his written and spoken works, including the locally produced public radio program, Crescent City. WWNO, the local public radio station, broadcasts the program and provides access to past Crescent City programs on its website.

A Midwest Cajun restaurant chain based in Indianapolis, Indiana carries the name Yats.

Cellphone company Boost Mobile used the phrase "Where Y'At?" in early advertising campaigns.

Who Dat? is a chant commonly tied to the Yat dialect and used in support of the New Orleans Saints football team. The entire chant is "Who dat? Who dat? Who dat say dey gonna beat dem Saints?" Saints fans are collectively called the "Who Dat Nation."

The Yat dialect is seldom heard when New Orleans is depicted in movies and television shows. Traditionally, characters portrayed from New Orleans are heard using a southern or Cajun accent. An example of this is 1986's The Big Easy, in which Dennis Quaid speaks an exaggerated Cajun/southern derivation. This trend has been challenged, though, in light of post-Katrina New Orleans representation, like HBO's Treme and Werner Herzog's Bad Lieutenant: Port of Call New Orleans, both of which feature actual New Orleans locals either speaking in Yat or one of its variations.

== Other local dialects and misconceptions ==
Historically, the city of New Orleans has been home to people of French, Spanish, and African heritages, which led to the creation of the Louisiana Creole language, before this city came under U.S. rule in the Louisiana Purchase. Over the course of the 19th century, the city transitioned from speaking French to becoming a non-rhotic English-speaking society. Similarly, much of the South has historically spoken non-rhotic English.

A misconception in other parts of the U.S. is that the local dialect of New Orleans is the same as Cajun English (spoken in several other areas of South Louisiana), but the city's cultural and linguistic traditions are distinct from that of the predominantly rural Acadiana, an area spanning across South Louisiana. While there has been an influx of Cajuns into the city since the oil boom of the later 20th century and while there are some similarities due to shared roots, Cajun culture has had relatively little influence upon Creole culture and thus Yat culture. The confusion of Cajun culture with the Creole culture is largely due to the confusion of these French cultures by the tourism and entertainment industries; sometimes this was done deliberately, as "Cajun" was often discovered to be a potentially lucrative marketing term. Speakers with a New Orleans accent are typically proud of their accent as it organically stems from the historical mixing of language and culture. This distinctive accent has been dying out generationally in the city due to white flight of the city, but remains very strong in the suburbs. However, the Yat dialect does survive in the city in several areas, notably Mid-city, Lakeview, parts of Gentilly and Uptown.
