= American English =

Variety of English language

- Region: United States
- Native speakers: 247.7 million, all varieties of English in the U.S. (2024)
- Language family: Indo-European: Germanic; West Germanic; North Sea Germanic; Anglo–Frisian; Anglic; English; North American English; American English
- Early forms: Old English: Middle English; Early Modern English; Modern English; 17th century British English; 18th century British English
- Dialects: Southern; African-American; Western; New England; Western Pennsylvania; North-Central; New York City; Midland; Philadelphia; Northern; American Indian; Pennsylvania Dutch; Cajun; Chicano; Miami; New York Latino; Californian
- Writing system: Latin (English alphabet); Unified English Braille

Official status
- Official language in: United States (Note: Federal government (de facto), 32 U.S. states, five U.S. territories; see Languages of the United States § Official languages.)

Language codes
- ISO 639-3: –
- Glottolog: None
- IETF: en-US

American English, sometimes called United States English or U.S. English, (Note: American English is variously abbreviated AmE, AE, AmEng, USEng, and en-US. (Note: en-US is the language code for U.S. English, as defined by ISO standards (see ISO 639-1 and ISO 3166-1 alpha-2) and Internet standards (see IETF language tag).)) is the set of varieties of the English language native to the United States. English is the most widely spoken language in the U.S., as well as the common language used in government, education, and commerce in all 50 states, the District of Columbia, and in all U.S. territories except Puerto Rico. Since the late 20th century, American English has become the most influential form of English worldwide.

Varieties of American English include many patterns of pronunciation, vocabulary, grammar, and particularly spelling that are unified nationwide but distinct from other forms of English around the world. Any American or Canadian accent perceived as lacking noticeably local, ethnic, or cultural markers is known in linguistics as General American; it covers a fairly uniform accent continuum native to certain regions of the U.S. and otherwise associated with broadcast mass media and highly educated speech. However, historical and present linguistic evidence does not support the notion of there being one single mainstream American accent. The sound of American English continues to evolve, with some local accents disappearing, but several larger regional accents having emerged in the 20th century.

== History ==
The use of English in the United States is a result of British colonization of the Americas. The first wave of English-speaking settlers arrived in North America during the early 17th century, followed by further migrations in the 18th and 19th centuries. During the 17th and 18th centuries, dialects from many different regions of England and the British Isles existed in every American colony, allowing a process of extensive dialect leveling and mixing in which English varieties across the Thirteen Colonies became more homogeneous compared with the varieties in the British Isles. English thus predominated in the colonies even by the end of the 17th century's first immigration of non-English speakers from Western Europe and slave trade from Africa.

Firsthand descriptions of a fairly uniform American English (particularly in contrast to the diverse regional dialects of British English) became common after the mid-18th century, while at the same time speakers' identification with this new variety increased. Since the 18th century, American English has developed into some new varieties, including regional dialects that retain minor influences from waves of immigrant speakers of diverse languages, primarily European languages.

Some racial and regional variation in American English reflects these groups' patterns of geographic settlement, segregation, and resettlement. This can be seen, for example, in the influence of 18th-century Protestant Ulster Scots immigrants (known in the U.S. as the Scotch-Irish) in Appalachia developing Appalachian English and the 20th-century Great Migration bringing African-American Vernacular English to the Great Lakes urban centers.

== Phonology ==
=== General American ===
Most American English accents fall under an umbrella known as General American. Rather than one particular accent, General American is a spectrum of those American accents that Americans themselves do not associate with some particular region, ethnicity, or socioeconomic group. General American features are used most by Americans in formal contexts or who are highly educated. Regional accents whose native features are perceived as General American include the accents of the North Midland (parts of the Midwest), Western New England, and the West.

The General American sound system's scope of influence and degree of expansion has been debated by linguists since the term was first used roughly a century ago. Many late-20th and early-21st century studies are showing that it is gradually ousting the regional accents in urban areas of the South and the interior North, New York City, Philadelphia, and many other areas. It can generally be said that younger Americans are avoiding their traditional local features in favor of this more nationwide norm. Furthermore, even General American itself appears to be evolving, with linguists identifying new features in speakers born since the last quarter of the 20th century, like a merger of the low-back vowels and a potentially related vowel shift, that are spreading across the nation.

=== Phonological features ===
Phonological (accent) features that are typical of American dialects—in contrast to British dialects—include features that concern consonants, such as rhoticity (pronunciation of all historical /r/ sounds), T and D flapping (with metal and medal pronounced the same, as [ˈmɛɾɫ̩]), velarization of L in all contexts (with filling pronounced [ˈfɪɫɪŋ], not [ˈfɪlɪŋ]), and yod-dropping after alveolar consonants (with new pronounced /nu/, not /nju/). Like many British accents, T glottalization is the norm in American accents, though only in particular environments (with satin pronounced [ˈsæʔn̩], not [ˈsætn̩]).

American features that concern vowel sounds include various vowel mergers before /r/ (so that Mary, marry, and merry are all commonly pronounced the same), raising and gliding of pre-nasal /æ/ (with man having a higher and tenser vowel sound than map), the weak vowel merger (with affecting and effecting often pronounced the same), and at least one of the LOT vowel mergers. Specifically, the LOT–PALM merger is complete among most Americans and the LOT–THOUGHT merger among roughly half. A three-way LOT–PALM–THOUGHT merger is also very common, meaning that words like baht, bot, and bought are all homophones. Most Americans pronounce the diphthong /aɪ/ before a voiceless consonant different from that same vowel before a voiced consonant: thus, in price and bright versus in prize and bride. For many, outside the South, the first element of the diphthong is a higher and shorter vowel sound when in pre-voiceless position as opposed to pre-voiced position. All of these phenomena are explained in further detail under General American.

Studies on historical usage of English in both the United States and the United Kingdom suggest that, while spoken American English deviated away from period British English in many ways, it is conservative in a few other ways, preserving certain features 20th- and 21st-century British English has since lost: namely, rhoticity. Unlike American accents, the traditional standard accent of (southern) England has evolved a trap–bath split. Moreover, American accents preserve /h/ at the start of syllables, while perhaps a majority of the regional dialects of England participate in /h/ dropping, particularly in informal contexts.

== Vocabulary ==
The process of developing new lexical items began as soon as British English-speaking colonists in North America began borrowing names for unfamiliar flora, fauna, and topography from the Native American languages. Examples of such names are opossum, raccoon, squash, moose (from Algonquian), wigwam, and moccasin. American English speakers have integrated traditionally non-English terms and expressions into the mainstream cultural lexicon; for instance, en masse, from French; cookie, from Dutch; kindergarten from German, and rodeo from Spanish. Landscape features are often loanwords from French or Spanish, and the word corn, used in England to refer to wheat (or any cereal), came to denote the maize plant, the most important crop in the U.S.

Other common differences between UK and American English include: aerial (UK) vs. antenna, biscuit (UK) vs. cookie/cracker, car park (UK) vs. parking lot, caravan (UK) vs. trailer, city centre (UK) vs. downtown, flat (UK) vs. apartment, fringe (UK; for hair hanging over the forehead) vs. bangs, and holiday (UK) vs. vacation.

Most Mexican Spanish contributions came after the War of 1812, with the opening of the West, like ranch (now a common house style). Due to Mexican culinary influence, many Spanish words are incorporated in general use when talking about certain popular dishes: cilantro (instead of coriander), queso, tacos, quesadillas, enchiladas, tostadas, fajitas, burritos, and guacamole. These words usually lack an English equivalent and are found in popular restaurants. New forms of dwelling created new terms (lot, waterfront) and types of homes like log cabin, adobe in the 18th century; apartment, shanty in the 19th century; project, condominium, townhouse, mobile home in the 20th century; and parts thereof (driveway, breezeway, backyard). Industry and material innovations from the 19th century onwards provide distinctive new words, phrases, and idioms through railroading (see further at rail terminology) and transportation terminology, ranging from types of roads (dirt roads, freeways) to infrastructure (parking lot, overpass, rest area), to automotive terminology often now standard in English internationally. Already existing English words—such as store, shop, lumber—underwent shifts in meaning; others remained in the U.S. while changing in Britain. Science, urbanization, and democracy have been important factors in bringing about changes in the written and spoken language of the United States. From the world of business and finance came new terms (merger, downsize, bottom line), from sports and gambling terminology came, specific jargon aside, common everyday American idioms, including many idioms related to baseball. The names of some American inventions remained largely confined to North America (elevator [except in the aeronautical sense], gasoline) as did certain automotive terms (truck, trunk).

New foreign loanwords came with 19th and early 20th century European immigration to the U.S.; notably, from Yiddish (chutzpah, schmooze, bupkis, glitch) and German (hamburger, wiener). A large number of English colloquialisms from various periods are American in origin; some have lost their American flavor (from OK and cool to nerd and 24/7), while others have not (have a nice day, for sure); many are now distinctly old-fashioned (swell, groovy). Some English words now in general use, such as hijacking, disc jockey, boost, bulldoze and jazz, originated as American slang.

American English has always shown a marked tendency to use words in different parts of speech and nouns are often used as verbs. Examples of nouns that are now also verbs are interview, advocate, vacuum, lobby, pressure, rear-end, transition, feature, profile, hashtag, head, divorce, loan, estimate, X-ray, spearhead, skyrocket, showcase, bad-mouth, vacation, major, and many others. Compounds coined in the U.S. are for instance foothill, landslide (in all senses), backdrop, teenager, brainstorm, bandwagon, hitchhike, smalltime, and a huge number of others. Other compound words have been founded based on industrialization and the wave of the automobile: five-passenger car, four-door sedan, two-door sedan, and station-wagon (called an estate car in British English). Some are euphemistic (human resources, affirmative action, correctional facility). Many compound nouns have the verb-and-preposition combination: stopover, lineup, tryout, spin-off, shootout, holdup, hideout, comeback, makeover, and many more. Some prepositional and phrasal verbs are in fact of American origin (win out, hold up, back up/off/down/out, face up to and many others).

Noun endings such as -ee (retiree), -ery (bakery), -ster (gangster) and -cian (beautician) are also particularly productive in the U.S. Several verbs ending in -ize are of U.S. origin; for example, fetishize, prioritize, burglarize, accessorize, weatherize, etc.; and so are some back-formations (locate, fine-tune, curate, donate, emote, upholster and enthuse). Among syntactic constructions that arose are outside of, headed for, meet up with, back of, etc. Americanisms formed by alteration of some existing words include notably pesky, phony, rambunctious, buddy, sundae, skeeter, sashay and kitty-corner. Adjectives that arose in the U.S. are, for example, lengthy, bossy, cute and cutesy, punk (in all senses), sticky (of the weather), through (as in "finished"), and many colloquial forms such as peppy or wacky.

A number of words and meanings that originated in Middle English or Early Modern English and that have been in everyday use in the United States have since disappeared in most varieties of British English; some of these have cognates in Lowland Scots. Terms such as fall ("autumn"), faucet ("tap"), diaper ("nappy"; itself unused in the U.S.), candy ("sweets"), skillet, eyeglasses, and obligate are often regarded as Americanisms. Fall, however, came to denote the season in 16th century England, a contraction of Middle English expressions like "fall of the leaf" and "fall of the year". Gotten (past participle of get) is often considered to be largely an Americanism. Other words and meanings were brought back to Britain from the U.S., especially in the second half of the 20th century; these include hire ("to employ"), I guess (famously criticized by H. W. Fowler), baggage, hit (a place), and the adverbs overly and presently ("currently"). Some of these, for example, monkey wrench and wastebasket, originated in 19th century Britain. The adjectives mad meaning "angry", smart meaning "intelligent", and sick meaning "ill" are also more frequent in American (and Irish) English than British English.

Linguist Bert Vaux created a survey, completed in 2003, polling English speakers across the United States about their specific everyday word choices, hoping to identify regionalisms. The study found that most Americans prefer the term sub for a long sandwich, soda (but pop in the Great Lakes region and generic coke in the South) for a sweet and bubbly soft drink, you or you guys for the plural of you (but y'all in the South), sneakers for athletic shoes (but often tennis shoes outside the Northeast), and shopping cart for a cart used for carrying supermarket goods.

== Grammar and orthography ==
American English and British English (BrE) differ in relatively minor ways in their grammar and writing conventions. The first large American dictionary, An American Dictionary of the English Language, known as Webster's Dictionary, was written by Noah Webster in 1828, codifying several of these spellings.

Differences in grammar are relatively minor, and do not normally affect mutual intelligibility; these include: typically a lack of differentiation between adjectives and adverbs, employing the equivalent adjectives as adverbs he ran quick/he ran quickly; different use of some auxiliary verbs; formal (rather than notional) agreement with collective nouns; different preferences for the past forms of a few verbs (for example, AmE/BrE: learned/learnt, burned/burnt, snuck/sneaked, dove/dived) although the purportedly "British" forms can occasionally be seen in American English writing as well; different prepositions and adverbs in certain contexts (for example, AmE in school, BrE at school); and whether or not a definite article is used, in very few cases (AmE to the hospital, BrE to hospital; contrast, however, AmE actress Elizabeth Taylor, BrE the actress Elizabeth Taylor). Often, these differences are a matter of relative preferences rather than absolute rules; and most are not stable since the two varieties are constantly influencing each other, and American English is not a standardized set of dialects.

Differences in orthography are also minor. The main differences are that American English usually uses spellings such as flavor for British flavour, fiber for fibre, defense for defence, analyze for analyse, license for licence, catalog for catalogue and traveling for travelling. Noah Webster popularized such spellings in America, but he did not invent most of them. Rather, "he chose already existing options on such grounds as simplicity, analogy or etymology." Other differences are due to the francophile tastes of the 19th century Victorian era Britain (for example they preferred programme for program, manoeuvre for maneuver, cheque for check, etc.). AmE almost always uses -ize in words like realize. BrE prefers -ise, but also uses -ize on occasion (see: Oxford spelling).

There are a few differences in punctuation rules. British English is more tolerant of run-on sentences, called "comma splices" in American English, and American English prefers that periods and commas be placed inside closing quotation marks even in cases in which British rules would place them outside. American English also favors the double quotation mark ("like this") over the single ('as here').

AmE sometimes favors words that are morphologically more complex, whereas BrE uses clipped forms, such as AmE transportation and BrE transport or where the British form is a back-formation, such as AmE burglarize and BrE burgle (from burglar). However, while individuals usually use one or the other, both forms will be widely understood and mostly used alongside each other within the two systems.

== Sub-varieties ==
The map above shows the major regional dialects of American English (in all caps) plus smaller and more local dialects, as demarcated primarily by Labov et al.'s The Atlas of North American English, as well as the related Telsur Project's regional maps. Any region may also contain speakers of a "General American" accent that resists the marked features of their region. Furthermore, this map does not account for speakers of ethnic or cultural varieties (such as African-American English, Chicano English, Cajun English, etc.).

While written American English is largely standardized across the country and spoken American English dialects are highly mutually intelligible, there are still several recognizable regional and ethnic accents, alongside mostly minor distinctions in vocabulary, grammatical structures, and other features.

=== Regional accents ===
The regional sounds of present-day American English are reportedly engaged in a complex phenomenon of "both convergence and divergence": some accents are homogenizing and leveling, while others are diversifying and deviating further away from one another. In 2010, William Labov noted that Great Lakes, Philadelphia, Pittsburgh, and West Coast accents have undergone "vigorous new sound changes" since the mid-nineteenth century onwards, so they "are now more different from each other than they were 50 or 100 years ago", while other accents, like those of New York City and Boston, have remained stable in that same timeframe.

Having been settled longer than the American West Coast, the East Coast has had more time to develop unique accents, and it currently comprises three or four linguistically significant regions, each of which possesses English varieties both different from each other as well as quite internally diverse: New England, the Mid-Atlantic states (including a New York accent as well as a unique Philadelphia–Baltimore accent), and the South. As of the 20th century, the middle and eastern Great Lakes area, Chicago being the largest city with these speakers, also ushered in certain unique features, including the fronting of the LOT /ɑ/ vowel in the mouth toward [a] and tensing of the TRAP /æ/ vowel wholesale to [eə]. These sound changes have triggered a series of other vowel shifts in the same region, known by linguists as the "Inland North". The Inland North shares with the Eastern New England dialect (including Boston accents) a backer tongue positioning of the GOOSE /u/ vowel (to [u]) and the MOUTH /aʊ/ vowel (to [ɑʊ~äʊ]) in comparison to the rest of the country. Ranging from northern New England across the Great Lakes to Minnesota, another Northern regional marker is the variable fronting of /ɑ/ before /r/, for example, appearing four times in the stereotypical Boston shibboleth Park the car in Harvard Yard.

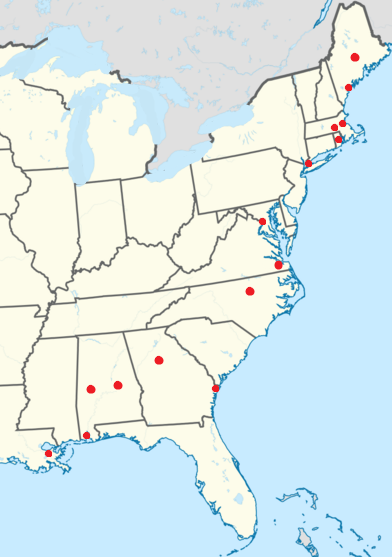
The red dots show every U.S. metropolitan area where over 50% non-rhotic speech was documented among some of that area's white speakers in the 1990s. Non-rhoticity may be heard among black speakers throughout the whole country.

Several other phenomena serve to distinguish regional American accents. Boston, Pittsburgh, Upper Midwestern, and Western U.S. accents have fully completed a merger of the LOT vowel with the THOUGHT vowel (/ɑ/ and /ɔ/, respectively): a cot–caught merger, which is rapidly spreading throughout the whole country. However, the South, Inland North, and a Northeastern coastal corridor passing through Rhode Island, New York City, Philadelphia, and Baltimore typically preserve an older cot–caught distinction. For that Northeastern corridor, the realization of the THOUGHT vowel is particularly marked, as depicted in humorous spellings, like in tawk and cawfee (talk and coffee), which intend to represent it being tense and diphthongal: [oə]. A split of TRAP into two separate phonemes, using different a pronunciations for example in gap [æ] versus gas [eə], further defines New York City as well as Philadelphia–Baltimore accents.

Most Americans preserve all historical /r/ sounds, using what is known as a rhotic accent. The only traditional r-dropping (or non-rhoticity) in regional American accents variably appears today in eastern New England, New York City, and some of the former plantation South primarily among older speakers (and, relatedly, some African-American Vernacular English across the country), though the vowel-consonant cluster found in "bird", "work", "hurt", "learn", etc. usually retains its r pronunciation, even in these non-rhotic American accents. Non-rhoticity among such speakers is presumed to have arisen from their upper classes' close historical contact with England, imitating London's r-dropping, a feature that has continued to gain prestige throughout England from the late 18th century onwards, but which has conversely lost prestige in the U.S. since at least the early 20th century. Non-rhoticity makes a word like car sound like cah or source like sauce.

New York City and Southern accents are the most widely recognized regional accents in the country, as well as the most stigmatized and socially disfavored. Southern speech, strongest in southern Appalachia and certain areas of Texas, is often identified by Americans as a "country" accent, and is defined by the /aɪ/ vowel losing its gliding quality: [aː], the initiation event for a complicated Southern vowel shift, including a "Southern drawl" that makes short front vowels into distinct-sounding gliding vowels. The fronting of the vowels of GOOSE, GOAT, MOUTH, and STRUT tends to also define Southern accents as well as the accents spoken in the "Midland": a vast band of the country that constitutes an intermediate dialect region between the traditional North and South. Western U.S. accents mostly fall under the General American spectrum.

Below, ten major American English accents are defined by their particular combinations of certain vowel sounds:

Accent name	Most populous city	Strong /aʊ/ fronting	Strong /oʊ/ fronting	Strong /u/ fronting	Strong /ɑr/ fronting	Cot–caught merger	Pin–pen merger	/æ/ raising system
General American		No	No	No	No	Mixed	No	pre-nasal
Inland Northern	Chicago	No	No	No	Yes	No	No	general
Midland	Indianapolis	Yes	Yes	Yes	No	Mixed	Mixed	pre-nasal
New York City	New York City	Yes	No	No	No	No	No	split
North-Central (Upper Midwestern)	Fargo	No	No	No	Yes	Mixed	No	pre-nasal & pre-velar
Northeastern New England	Boston	No	No	No	Yes	Yes	No	pre-nasal
Philadelphia/Baltimore	Philadelphia	Yes	Yes	Yes	No	No	No	split
Southern	San Antonio	Yes	Yes	Yes	No	Mixed	Yes	Southern
Western	Los Angeles	No	No	Yes	No	Yes	No	pre-nasal
Western Pennsylvania	Pittsburgh	Yes	Yes	Yes	No	Yes	Mixed	pre-nasal

=== Other varieties ===
Although no longer region-specific, African-American Vernacular English, which remains the native variety of most working- and middle-class African Americans, has a close relationship to Southern dialects and has greatly influenced everyday speech of many Americans, including hip hop culture. Hispanic and Latino Americans have also developed native-speaker varieties of English. The best-studied Latino Englishes are Chicano English, spoken in the West and Midwest, and New York Latino English, spoken in the New York metropolitan area. Additionally, ethnic varieties such as Yeshiva English and "Yinglish" are spoken by some American Orthodox Jews, Cajun Vernacular English by some Cajuns in southern Louisiana, and Pennsylvania Dutch English by some Pennsylvania Dutch people. American Indian Englishes have been documented among diverse Indian tribes. The island state of Hawaii, though primarily English-speaking, is also home to a creole language known commonly as Hawaiian Pidgin, and some Hawaii residents speak English with a Pidgin-influenced accent. American English also gave rise to some dialects outside the country, for example, Philippine English, beginning during the American occupation of the Philippines and subsequently the Insular Government of the Philippine Islands; Thomasites first established a variation of American English in these islands.

== Nationwide usage and status ==
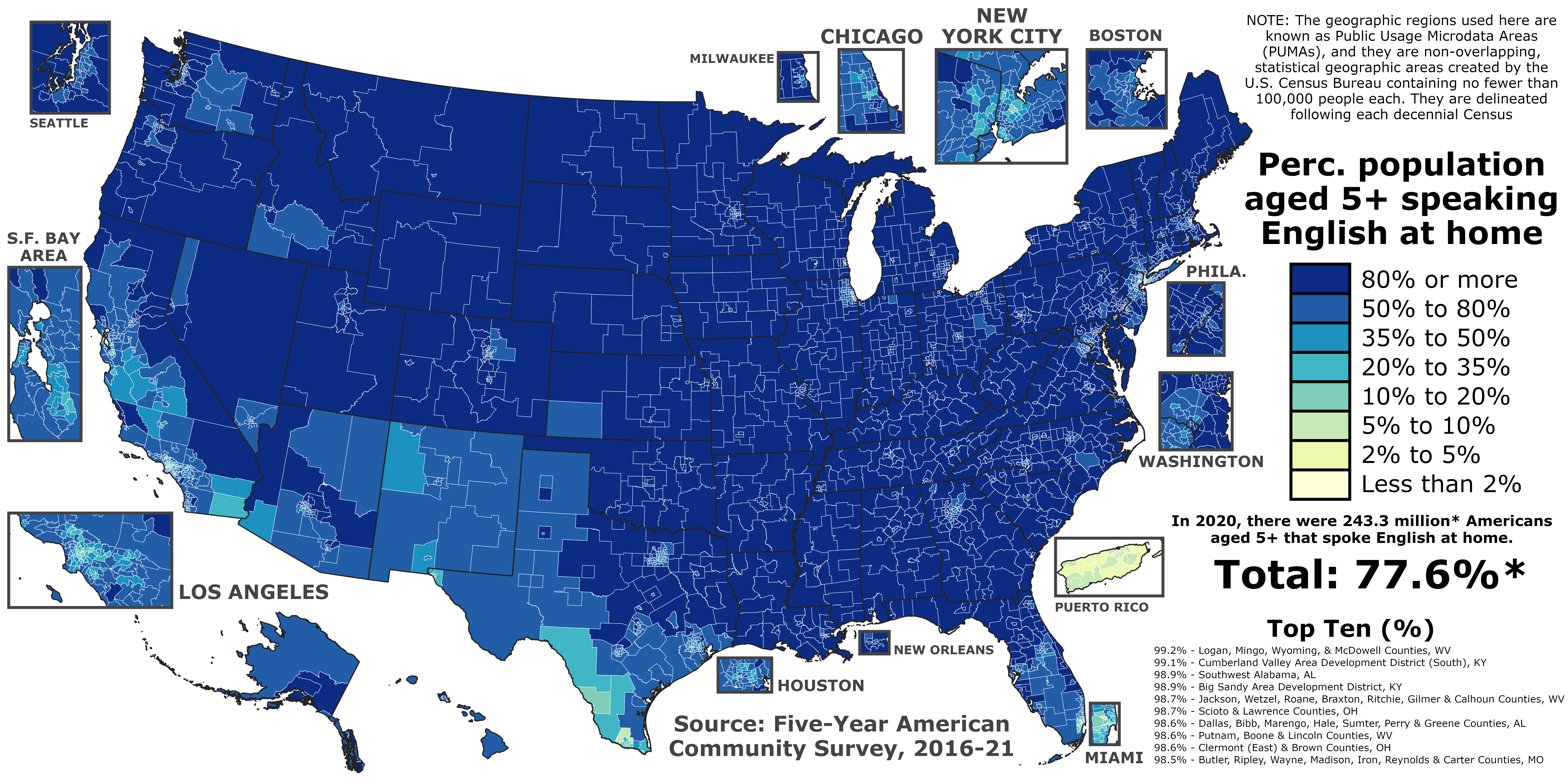
Percentage of Americans aged 5+ speaking English at home in each Public Usage Microdata Area (PUMA) of the fifty states, the District of Columbia, and Puerto Rico according to the 2016–2021 five-year American Community Survey

Map of U.S. official language status by state. English declared the official language Multiple official languages, including English (Alaska, Hawaii, South Dakota), or languages with special status (New Mexico) No official language specified.

In 2024, about 247.7 million Americans, aged five or above, spoke English at home, a majority (77%) of the total U.S. population aged five and over.

Of the 50 states, 32 have adopted legislation granting official (or co-official) status to English within their jurisdictions, in some cases as part of what has been called the English-only movement. Typically only "English" is specified, not a particular variety like American English. (From 1923 to 1969, the state of Illinois recognized its official language as "American", meaning American English.)

De jure, there is no official language in the U.S. at the federal level, as there is no federal law designating any language to be official. Still, English has always been the common language used at the federal and state levels. In 2025, Donald Trump issued Executive Order 14224, declaring English the official language of the U.S., and federal agencies recognize this under the order.

Puerto Rico is the only United States territory in which another language – Spanish – is the common language at home, in public, and in government.

== See also ==
- American and British English spelling differences
- Canadian English
- Dictionary of American Regional English
- International English
- Sound correspondences between English accents
- International Phonetic Alphabet chart for the English Language
- List of English words from Indigenous languages of the Americas
- Phonological history of English
- Regional accents of English

== Bibliography ==
- Baker, Adam; Mielke, Jeff; Archangeli, Diana (2008). "More velar than /g/: Consonant Coarticulation as a Cause of Diphthongization" (PDF). In Chang, Charles B.; Haynie, Hannah J. (eds.). Proceedings of the 26th West Coast Conference on Formal Linguistics. Somerville, Massachusetts: Cascadilla Proceedings Project. pp. 60–68. ISBN 978-1-57473-423-2. Archived (PDF) from the original on October 9, 2022.
- Boberg, Charles (2008). "Regional phonetic differentiation in Standard Canadian English". Journal of English Linguistics. 36 (2): 129–154. doi:10.1177/0075424208316648. S2CID 146478485.
- Boyce, S.; Espy-Wilson, C. (1997). "Coarticulatory stability in American English /r/" (PDF). Journal of the Acoustical Society of America. 101 (6): 3741–3753. Bibcode:1997ASAJ..101.3741B. doi:10.1121/1.418333. PMID 9193061. Archived from the original (PDF) on October 9, 2022.
- Collins, Beverley; Mees, Inger M. (2002). The Phonetics of Dutch and English (5 ed.). Leiden/Boston: Brill Publishers.
- Delattre, P.; Freeman, D.C. (1968). "A dialect study of American R's by x-ray motion picture". Linguistics. 44: 29–68.
- Duncan, Daniel (2016). "'Tense' /æ/ is still lax: A phonotactics study" (PDF). In Hansson, Gunnar Ólafur; Farris-Trimble, Ashley; McMullin, Kevin; Pulleyblank, Douglas (eds.). Supplemental Proceedings of the 2015 Annual Meeting on Phonology. Proceedings of the Annual Meetings on Phonology. Vol. 3. Washington, D.C.: Linguistic Society of America. doi:10.3765/amp.v3i0.3653.
- Hallé, Pierre A.; Best, Catherine T.; Levitt, Andrea (1999). "Phonetic vs. phonological influences on French listeners' perception of American English approximants". Journal of Phonetics. 27 (3): 281–306. doi:10.1006/jpho.1999.0097.
- Jones, Daniel; Roach, Peter; Hartman, James (2006). English Pronouncing Dictionary. Cambridge University Press. ISBN 978-0-521-68086-8.
- Kortmann, Bernd; Schneider, Edgar W. (2004). A Handbook of Varieties of English. Walter de Gruyter GmbH & Company KG. ISBN 978-3-11-017532-5.
- Kretzchmar, William A. (2004), Kortmann, Bernd; Schneider, Edgar W. (eds.), A Handbook of Varieties of English, Berlin/New York: Mouton de Gruyter, ISBN 978-3-11-017532-5
- Labov, William (2012). Dialect diversity in America: The politics of language change. University of Virginia.
- Labov, William (2007). "Transmission and Diffusion" (PDF). Language. 83 (2): 344–387. doi:10.1353/lan.2007.0082. JSTOR 40070845. S2CID 6255506. Archived (PDF) from the original on October 9, 2022.
- Labov, William; Ash, Sharon; Boberg, Charles (2006). The Atlas of North American English. Berlin: Mouton de Gruyter. ISBN 978-3-11-016746-7.
- Longmore, Paul K. (2007). "'Good English without Idiom or Tone': The Colonial Origins of American Speech". The Journal of Interdisciplinary History. 37 (4). MIT: 513–542. doi:10.1162/jinh.2007.37.4.513. JSTOR 4139476. S2CID 143910740.
- Trudgill, Peter (2004). New-Dialect Formation: The Inevitability of Colonial Englishes.
- Wells, John (2008). Longman Pronunciation Dictionary. Pearson. ISBN 978-1-4058-8118-0.
- Wells, John C. (1982). Accents of English. Vol. 1: An Introduction (pp. i–xx, 1–278), Vol. 2: The British Isles (pp. i–xx, 279–466), Vol. 3: Beyond the British Isles (pp. i–xx, 467–674). Cambridge University Press. doi:10.1017/CBO9780511611759, doi:10.1017/CBO9780511611766. ISBN 0-52129719-2, 0-52128540-2, 0-52128541-0.
- Zawadzki, P.A.; Kuehn, D.P. (1980). "A cineradiographic study of static and dynamic aspects of American English /r/". Phonetica. 37 (4): 253–266. doi:10.1159/000259995. PMID 7443796. S2CID 46760239.
