= North-Central American English =

English dialect of the American Midwest

- Region: Upper Midwest
- Language family: Indo-European: Germanic; West Germanic; Ingvaeonic; Anglo–Frisian; English; North American English; American English; North-Central American English
- Early forms: Old English: Middle English; Early Modern English

Language codes
- ISO 639-3: –
- Glottolog: nort3317

North-Central American English is an American English dialect, or dialect in formation, native to the Upper Midwestern United States, an area that somewhat overlaps with speakers of the Inland Northern dialect situated more in the eastern Great Lakes region. In the United States, it is also known as the Upper Midwestern or North-Central dialect and stereotypically recognized as a Minnesota accent or sometimes Wisconsin accent (excluding Wisconsin's Milwaukee metropolitan area). It is considered to have developed in a residual dialect region from the neighboring Western, Inland Northern, and Canadian dialect regions.

If a strict cot–caught merger is used to define the North-Central regional dialect, it covers the Upper Peninsula of Michigan, the northern border of Wisconsin, the whole northern half of Minnesota, some of northern South Dakota, and most of North Dakota; otherwise, the dialect may be considered to extend to all of Minnesota, North Dakota, most of South Dakota, northern Iowa, northeastern Nebraska, eastern Montana (east of Billings), and all of Wisconsin outside of the southern portion of the eastern ridges and lowlands.

== History and geography ==
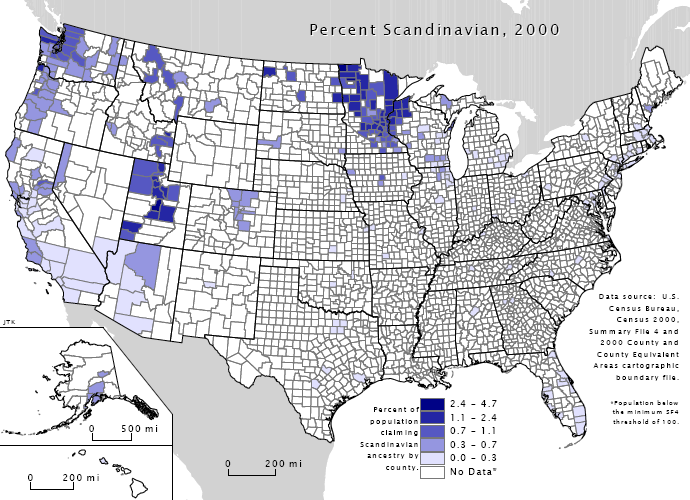
Percentage of the U.S. in 2000, by county, with Scandinavian heritage; note Minnesota, northwestern Wisconsin, and eastern North Dakota.

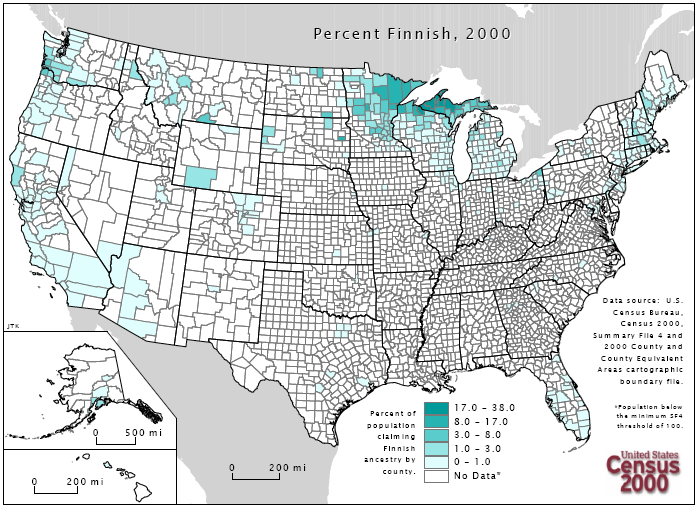
Percentage of the U.S. in 2000, by county, with Finnish heritage; note the upper regions of Minnesota, Wisconsin, and Michigan.

The appearance of monophthongs in this region is sometimes attributed to the high degree of Scandinavian and German immigration to these northern states in the late 19th century. The linguist Erik R. Thomas argues that these monophthongs are the product of language contact and notes that other areas in which they occur are places in which speakers of other languages have influenced such as the Pennsylvania "Dutch" region. An alternative account posits that the monophthongal variants represent historical retentions since diphthongization of the mid vowels seems to have been a relatively recent phenomenon in the history of the English language, appeared within the last few centuries, and has not affected all dialects in the United Kingdom. The monophthongs heard in this region may stem from the influence of Scots-Irish or other British dialects that maintain such forms. The fact that the monophthongs also appear in Canadian English may lend support to this account since Scots-Irish speech is known as an important influence in Canada.

People living in the Upper Peninsula of Michigan (whose demonym and sometimes sub-dialect is known as "Yooper," deriving from the acronym "U.P." for "Upper Peninsula"), many northern areas of the Lower Peninsula of Michigan, and in Northern Wisconsin are largely of Finnish, French Canadian, Cornish, Scandinavian, German or Native American descent. The North-Central dialect is so strongly influenced by those areas' languages and by Canada that speakers from other areas may have difficulty understanding it. Almost half the Finnish immigrants to the U.S. settled in the Upper Peninsula, and some joined Scandinavians who moved on to Minnesota. Another sub-dialect is spoken in Southcentral Alaska's Matanuska-Susitna Valley because it was settled in the 1930s (during the Great Depression) by immigrants from the North-Central dialect region.

== Phonology ==
Not all of these characteristics are unique to the North-Central region:

=== Vowels ===
- /u/ and /oʊ/ are "conservative" in this region: they do not undergo the fronting that is common in some other regions of the United States. In addition to being conservative, /oʊ/ may have undergone monophthongization to [o]. The same is true for /eɪ/, which can be realized as [e], but data suggest that monophthongal variants are more common for /oʊ/ than for /eɪ/, and that they are more common in coat than in ago or road, which may indicate phonological conditioning. Regionally, monophthongal mid vowels are more common in the northern tier of states and occur more frequently in Minnesota and the Dakotas but much rarer in Iowa and Nebraska. The appearance of monophthongs in the region is sometimes explained due to the high degree of Scandinavians and German immigration to these northern states in the late nineteenth century. Erik R. Thomas argues that the monophthongs are the product of language contact and notes that other areas in which they occur are places in which speakers of other languages have had an influence, such as the Pennsylvania "Dutch" region. An alternative account posits that the monophthongal variants represent historical retentions. Diphthongization of the mid vowels seems to have been a relatively recent phenomenon, appearing within the last few centuries, and did not affect all dialects in the United Kingdom. The monophthongs that are heard in this region may stem from the influence of Scots-Irish or other British dialects that maintain such forms. The fact that the monophthongs also appear in Canadian English may lend support to this account since Scots-Irish speech is known as an important influence in Canada.
- Some or partial evidence of the Northern Cities Vowel Shift, which normally defines neighboring Inland Northern American English, exists in North-Central American English. For example, /æ/ may be generally raised and /ɑ/ generally fronted in comparison to other American English accents.
- Some speakers exhibit extreme raising of /æ/ before voiced velars (/ɡ/ and /ŋ/), with an up-glide, and so bag sounds close to beg or is even raised like the first syllable of bagel. Other examples are the words flag and agriculture.
- Raising of /aɪ/ is found in the region and occurs before some voiced consonants. For example, many speakers pronounce fire, tiger, and spider with the raised vowel. Some speakers in this region raise /aʊ/ as well.
- The onset of /aʊ/ if it is not subject to raising is often quite far back and results in pronunciations like [ɑʊ].
- The cot–caught merger is common throughout the region, and the vowel can be quite forward: [ä].
- The words roof and root may be variously pronounced with either /ʊ/ or /u/; that is, with the vowel of foot or boot, respectively. That is highly variable, however, and the words are pronounced both ways in other parts of the country.
- The North-Central accent shows certain General American features, such as rhoticity and the Mary-marry-merry merger, as well as a lack of both the pen–pin merger of the American South and the Canadian shift.

=== Consonants ===
Word-initial th-stopping is possible among speakers of working-class backgrounds, especially with pronouns: 'deez' for these, 'doze' for those, 'dem' for them, etc. In addition, traces of a pitch accent as in Swedish and Norwegian persist in some areas of heavy Norwegian or Swedish settlement and among people who grew up in those areas, some of whom are not of Scandinavian descent.

=== Phonemic incidence ===
Certain phonemes appear in particular words and set the North-Central dialect apart from some other American English:

- absurd often uses /z/ (rather than /s/)
- across may end with a final /st/ and rhyme with cost, particularly in Wisconsin
- anti often uses /aɪ/ (rather than /i/)
- aunt often uses /ɑ/ (rather than /æ/)
- roof often uses /ʊ/ (rather than /u/)
- turbine often uses /ən/ (rather than /aɪn/) and so has the same pronunciation as turban
- Words spelled with ag, such as bag or ragged, use /eɪ/ or /ɛ/ (rather than /æ/)
- Final -ing in nouns and nonfinite verb endings tends to be realized as [in] (rather than /ɪŋ/) and so morning with g-dropping is [ˈmoɹnin]

== Grammar ==
In this dialect, the preposition with is used without an object as an adverb in phrases like come with, as in Do you want to come with? for the standard Do you want to come with me? or with us? In standard English, other prepositions can be used as adverbs, like go down (down as adverb) for go down the stairs (down as preposition). With is not typically used in that way in Standard English (particularly in British and Irish English), and that feature likely came from languages spoken by some immigrants, such as Scandinavian (Danish, Swedish, Norwegian), German, or Dutch and Luxembourgish, all of which have the construction, like Danish and Swedish kom med or German komm mit.

The adverb "yet" may be used in a phrase such as "I need to clean this room yet" to mean "still," particularly around Wisconsin and the Upper Peninsula. "Shut the lights" may mean "shut off the lights," particularly in the same places.

== Vocabulary ==
- boulevard, a grassy median strip
- berm, boulevard, or terrace, a grassy road verge
- bubbler, a drinking fountain (mainly used in Eastern Wisconsin, especially Milwaukee)
- breezeway or skyway, a hallway-bridge connecting two buildings
- duck, duck, gray duck, the children's game duck, duck, goose in Minnesota
- eh?, a question tag (particularly used in the northern sections of Minnesota, Wisconsin, and Upper Michigan)
- frontage road, a service or access road
- hotdish, a simple entree (main) cooked in a single dish, like a casserole
- ope, an onomatopoeia with variable meanings, including "excuse me" or "I'm sorry" Its a shortening and formal variation of the informal exclamation "oops", used to politely minimize focus on the mistake or accident that provoked its use in the first place; typically spoken quickly and less conspicuously than the word its derived from.
- pop or soda pop, a sweet carbonated soft drink
- parking ramp, a multi-story parking structure
- rummage sale, a yard or garage sale
- sliver, a splinter
- spendy, expensive or high-priced
- stocking cap, a knit wool hat
- supposably (for supposedly), particularly in Wisconsin
- troll, a person from the Lower Peninsula of Michigan
- uff da, a Scandinavian exclamation or interjection used to express dismay, surprise, astonishment, exhaustion, or relief
- Yooper, a person from the Upper Peninsula of Michigan

== Sub-varieties ==
A North-Central "dialect island" exists in southcentral Alaska's Matanuska-Susitna Valley, since, in the 1930s, it absorbed large numbers of settlers from Michigan, Minnesota, and Wisconsin. "Yooper" English spoken in the Upper Peninsula of Michigan and Iron Range English spoken in Minnesota's Mesabi Iron Range are strong sub-varieties of the North-Central dialect, largely influenced by Nordic immigration to those areas around the beginning of the twentieth century. Iron Range English is sometimes called "Rayncher" English (an eye spelling of "Ranger").

=== Upper Peninsula English ===
English of the Upper Peninsula of Michigan, plus some bordering areas of northeast Wisconsin, colloquially known as U.P. or "Yooper" English, or rarely Yoopanese, is a North-Central sub-variety with some additional influences from Finnish-speaking immigrants to the region. However, younger speakers may be starting to align closer to nearby Standard Canadian English, according to a 2014 study of Marquette County.

The traditional Yooper accent is associated with certain features: the alveolar stops /d/ and /t/ in place of the English dental fricatives /ð/ and /θ/ (like in "then" and "thigh", so that then (/ðɛn/) becomes den (/dɛn/), etc.); the German/Scandinavian affirmative ja [jä] to mean 'yeah' or 'yes' (often Anglicized in spelling to ya); the filler or question tag eh or hey at the ends of sentences, as in Canadian English; notably raised nuclei in the vowels /aʊ/ and /aɪ/; the word youse as a second-personal plural noun, like you guys in neighboring dialects; and a marked deletion of to the (e.g., "I'm going store," "We went mall," and "We'll go Green Bay"), influenced by Finnish, which does not have any articles corresponding to a, an, or the.

== In popular culture ==
The Minnesota accent is made conspicuous in the film Fargo (especially as displayed by Frances McDormand's character Marge Gunderson) and the subsequent television series.

The accent can be heard from many minor characters, especially those voiced by Sue Scott, in the radio program A Prairie Home Companion. It is also evident in the film New in Town.

== Notable lifelong native speakers ==
- Steven Avery – "recognizably thick Wisconsin accent"
- Michele Bachmann – "that calming, matzoh-flat Minnesota accent"
- Charlie Berens (in character)
- Jan Kuehnemund
- Brock Lesnar
- Don Ness – "You'll find that Ms. Palin and Duluth Mayor Don Ness don't sound all that different."
- Julianne Ortman
- Sarah Palin – "Listeners who hear the Minnewegian sounds of the characters from Fargo when they listen to Ms. Palin are on to something: the Matanuska-Susitna Valley in Alaska, where she grew up, was settled by farmers from Minnesota"
- Mark Proksch

== See also ==
- Inland Northern American English
- North American English regional phonology
- Regional vocabularies of American English
