= Ted Sanders (linguist) =

Dutch linguist

- Born: 1963 (age 62–63); Eindhoven
- Occupation: Linguist

Academic background
- Education: Languages and Literature, Discourse Studies
- Alma mater: Tilburg University

Academic work
- Discipline: Discourse
- Sub-discipline: Causality
- Institutions: Utrecht University, ILS

Ted (T.J.M.) Sanders is a Dutch linguist and Full Professor of Discourse Studies and Language Use in the Faculty of Humanities at Utrecht University.

As of June 2024 he is Vice-Rector of Research at Utrecht University. Before that he was Vice-dean for Research

and Impact in the Faculty Board of Humanities (2022–2024), Vice-Dean of Graduate Education and Dean of the Graduate School of Humanities (2016–2022), the first head of the Department Languages, Literature and Communication (2012–2016), and head of the Departments of Dutch and Modern Languages (2011–2012).

== Biography ==
Theodorus Johannes Maria Sanders (Eindhoven, 1963) studied Languages and Literature at Tilburg University (1981–1986) and graduated (cum laude) in Discourse Studies. Between 1986 and 1992, he worked on his PhD here, while he was also employed by the Educational Testing Service (CITO) in Arnhem. In December 1992, he defended his thesis Discourse structure and coherence, promotor Prof. Dr. L.G.M. Noordman. At Utrecht University, he was appointed as an Assistant Professor (1992–1997), Associate Professor of Text Linguistics (1997–2002), and Full Professor of Discourse Studies (2003). In 2007, he was a guest researcher at the "Department of Linguistics" and the "Institute for Cognitive Studies" of the University of California at Berkeley. In 2023/24 he headed the Desiderius Erasmus-Chair ‘Dutch across the borders’ at the Faculty of Philosophy and Arts at the Université Catholique de Louvain (Belgium).

== Research ==
His research, embedded in the Institute for Language Sciences (ILS), focuses on coherence in text, discourse and cognition. He uses various research methods, at the interface of Humanities and Social Sciences: theory construction, corpus-analysis, text analysis, questionnaires and experimental research on discourse processing (reading times and Eye-tracking) and text comprehension. Together with colleagues, he developed CCR, a cognitive approach of Coherence relations.

Together with colleagues, he also works on comprehensible language: which factors contribute to comprehensibility of texts? He co-initiated and led the nation-wide research program Comprehensible Language and Effective Communication, which was funded by NWO and several societal partners (2011–2016). He was also involved in joint research directed towards societal impact in this domain.

In 2005, NWO awarded him a VICI-grant for a project on Causality and Subjectivity in Discourse and Cognition (2005–2011).

== Publications ==
Together with co-authors, he published on the themes mentioned above in various books and international journals, such as Cognition, Cognitive Linguistics, Discourse Processes, Dialogue & Discourse, Journal of Child language, Journal of Pragmatics, Language and Cognitive processes, Language Testing, Metacognition and Learning, Reading and Writing, Text & Talk, Written Communication.

He was also a (co-)editor of special issues of Cognitive Linguistics (2001), Discourse Processes (2004) and Journal of Pragmatics (2011). Together with Joost Schilperoord and Wilbert Spooren, he edited Text Representation: Linguistic and Psycholinguistic approaches (Benjamins, 2001), and together with Eve Sweetser (UC Berkeley) he edited Causal Categories in Discourse and Cognition (Mouton de Gruyter, 2009).

== Selected publications ==
- Sanders, T.J.M. W.P.M. Spooren & L.G.M. Noordman (1992). Toward a taxonomy of coherence relations. Discourse Processes, 15(1), 1–35.
- Sanders, T.J.M., & Noordman, L.G.M. (2000). The role of coherence relations and their linguistic markers in text processing. Discourse Processes, 29(1), 37–60.
- Canestrelli, A. R., Mak, W. M., & Sanders, T.J.M. (2013). Causal connectives in discourse processing: How differences in subjectivity are reflected in eye-movements. Language and Cognitive processes, 28(9), 1394–1413.
- van Silfhout, G., Evers-Vermeul, J., Mak, W. M., & Sanders, T.J.M. (2014). Connectives and layout as processing signals: How textual features affect students’ processing and text representation. Journal of Educational Psychology, 106(4), 1036–1048.

== Inaugural lecture ==
Sanders, T.J.M. (2004). Tekst doordenken. Taalbeheersing als de studie van taalgebruik en tekstkwaliteit. Oratie, Faculteit der Letteren, Universiteit Utrecht, 19 November 2004.
