= Sandra Thompson (linguist) =

American linguist

- Born: July 6, 1941 (age 85)
- Known for: Rhetorical structure theory

Academic background
- Education: Ohio State University

Academic work
- Discipline: Linguist
- Sub-discipline: Discourse analysis, typology, interactional linguistics
- Institutions: University of California, Los Angeles; University of California, Santa Barbara

Sandra Annear Thompson (born July 6, 1941) is an American linguist specializing in discourse analysis, typology, and interactional linguistics. She is professor emeritus of linguistics at the University of California, Santa Barbara (UCSB). She has published numerous books, her research has appeared in many linguistics journals, and she serves on the editorial board of several prominent linguistics journals.

== Education ==
Thompson received her BA in linguistics from Ohio State University in 1963. She earned her MA in linguistics in 1965 and her PhD in 1969, both from Ohio State.

== Career ==
From 1968–1986, Thompson taught at the University of California, Los Angeles (UCLA). Since 1986, she has held a position at UCSB.

Thompson is known for her large body of research on Mandarin grammar, much of which she has conducted in collaboration with UCSB colleague Charles Li. Their 1981 book Mandarin Chinese: A Functional Reference Grammar is widely cited and often compared to Yuen Ren Chao's A Grammar of Spoken Chinese (1968). That work, along with her earlier work in Chinese resultative verb compounds, was a major contribution to the study of Chinese morphosyntax, and stood apart from contemporary research in that it devoted attention to the internal structure of Chinese compound words, whereas other research focused on the syntactic nature of compound words.

She has also conducted research on discourse and grammar, collaborating with linguists such as Paul Hopper on topics including transitivity and emergent grammar. With Christian Matthiessen and Bill Mann she developed rhetorical structure theory. Her interest in discourse led her to be involved in collecting data for the Santa Barbara Corpus of Spoken American English.

Thompson and Charles Li also carried out extensive documentation of the Wappo language, and, with Joseph Sung-yul Park, published a reference grammar of the language in 2006.

== Honors and awards ==
Thompson was awarded a Guggenheim Fellowship in 1988. She was president of the International Pragmatics Association from 1991–1994. She was named a Fellow of the Linguistic Society of America in 2007. In 2017, she was given the International Pragmatics Association's John J. Gumperz Lifetime Achievement Award at the 15th International Pragmatics Conference in Belfast. A volume of essays in her honor was published in 2002. The book Building Responsive Action, written together with Barbara Fox and Elizabeth Couper-Kuhlen, received the Best Book award from the International Society for Conversation Analysis in 2018.
