= C. M. I. M. Matthiessen =

Swedish linguist (born 1956)

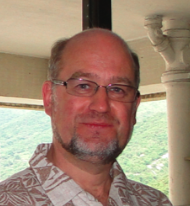
- Born: 1956 (age 69–70); Sweden
- Known for: Systemic functional linguistics, rhetorical structure theory
- Scientific career
- Fields: Linguistics

Christian Matthias Ingemar Martin Matthiessen (born 1956) is a Swedish-born linguist and a leading figure in the systemic functional linguistics (SFL) school, having authored or co-authored more than 100 books, refereed journal articles, and papers in refereed conference proceedings, with contributions to three television programs. One of his major works is Lexicogrammatical cartography (1995), a 700-page study of the grammatical systems of English from the perspective of SFL. He has co-authored a number of books with Michael Halliday. Since 2008 he has been a professor in the Department of English at the Hong Kong Polytechnic University. Before this, he was Chair of the Department of Linguistics at Macquarie University in Sydney.

== Biography ==
Matthiessen was born and raised in Sweden. His mother, Christine Matthiessen, is credited with starting his interest in language as an object of study. His father, Martin Edmond, was a painter. Matthiessen completed his undergraduate degree at Lund University in 1980, where he studied English, Arabic, and philosophy. His Master of Arts was taken at UCLA, with a dissertation on English tense. In 1989 he completed a PhD at the same institution: Text generation as a linguistic research task. While studying at UCLA, he worked first as a teaching assistant. From 1980 to 1983 he was a research assistant at the Information Sciences Institute at the University of Southern California.

In 1983 he took a position as research linguist at the institute, where he worked on the application and development of systemic theory and descriptions for text generation, including the maintenance and expansion of a systemic grammar of English for text generation. It was during this time that he worked with Bill Mann and Sandra Thompson in the development of rhetorical structure theory. In 1988 he moved to the University of Sydney, where he was lecturer, then senior lecturer until 1994. During this period he worked on multilanguage generation, speech generation, English grammar, semantics and discourse, and systemic functional theory. In 1994 he moved to Macquarie University's Department of Linguistics, first as associate professor. In 2002 he took up a chair at Macquarie until 2008, when he was appointed chair and head of the Department of English at the Hong Kong Polytechnic University. From 2009 to mid-2012, he was also associate dean of the Faculty of Humanities at PolyU. Since May 2011, he has been honorary professor at Beijing Normal University, Beijing, and guest professor at the University of Science and Technology, Beijing.

== Contributions to linguistics ==
Matthiessen has worked in areas as diverse as language typology, linguistics and computing, grammatical descriptions, grammar and discourse, functional grammar for English-language teachers, text analysis and translation, language typology, the evolution of language. He is an author of Rhetorical Structure Theory, along with Bill Mann and Sandra Thompson. Matthiessen's 1,000-page Lexicogrammatical Cartography offers "the best account of the S.F. description of English based on Halliday's work." His co-authored book, with Michael Halliday, Construing Experience through Meaning: A language based approach to cognition shows how to construe a linguistic/semiotic approach to cognition without invoking pre-linguistic mental fictions.

== Contributions to systemic functional linguistics ==
Matthiessen has worked across many areas of linguistics, but has specialized, theoretically, in the modelling of language from the systemic functional linguistics, including in systemic functional grammar. He has been described as the "de facto cartographer" of systemic functional grammar. Halliday acknowledges Matthiessen's work in extending the description of grammar from the systemic functional perspective via his contributions to the Penman project.

== Selected works ==
- Matthiessen C.M.I.M. (1995) Lexicogrammatical cartography: English systems, Tokyo, International Language Sciences Publishers
- Halliday M.A.K., Matthiessen C.M.I.M. (2000) Construing experience through meaning: a language-based approach to cognition, Open linguistics series, Continuum International.
- Matthiessen C.M.I.M., Caffarel A., Martin J.R. (2004) Language typology: a functional perspective, Amsterdam Studies in the Theory and History of Linguistic Science, Series IV: Current Issues in Linguistic Theory, 700 pp.
- Halliday, M.A.K., Matthiessen C.M.I.M. (2004). An introduction to functional grammar, 3rd ed. London, Arnold
- Matthiessen C.M.I.M. (2004) "Descriptive motifs and generalisations". In A. Caffarel, J.R. Martin, C.M.I.M. Matthiessen (eds.), Language typology: a functional perspective (pp. 537–64). Amsterdam/Philadelphia, John Benjamins
- Martin J.R., Painter C., Matthiessen C.M.I.M. (2006) Working with functional grammar, Hodder Arnold Publication, 340 pp.
- Matthiessen C.M.I.M., Halliday M.A.K. (2009) Systemic functional grammar: a first step into the theory, Higher Education Press

== See also ==
- Metafunction
