= Pennsylvania English =

Pennsylvania English or Pennsylvania dialects may refer to:

- Inland Northern American English, spoken in northeastern Pennsylvania
- Pennsylvania Dutch English, spoken in southeastern Pennsylvania by some of the Pennsylvania Dutch community
- Philadelphia English, spoken in southeastern Pennsylvania
- Western Pennsylvania English, spoken in western and some of central Pennsylvania, including Pittsburgh
