= Elizabeth Couper-Kuhlen =

American linguist

Elizabeth Couper-Kuhlen (born 1943) is an American linguist and distinguished professor emeritus at the University of Helsinki.

Couper-Kuhlen is regarded as an important figure in the development of interactional linguistics and the study of prosody in conversation, through a number of books co-edited with Margret Selting: the 1996 book Prosody in Conversation, the 2001 book Studies in Interactional Linguistics, and the 2018 textbook Interactional Linguistics. Her book Building Responsive Action, written together with Barbara Fox and Sandra Thompson, received the Best Book award from the International Society for Conversation Analysis in 2018.

Couper-Kuhlen is member of the editorial board of Research on Language and Social Interaction. She received an honorary doctorate from the University of Helsinki in 2017. For her 65th birthday, a conference and following book publication was dedicated to her.

== Biography ==
Elizabeth Couper-Kuhlen received a doctoral degree in 1977 on the basis of her thesis The Prepositional Passive in English, published in 1979, and was a lecturer in several different places in Germany. In 1991, she did her habilitation with the thesis English Speech Rhythm, published in 1993, and became professor of English linguistics at the University of Konstanz in 1995. In 2003, she moved to the University of Potsdam for another professorship, until she became Finland Distinguished Professor at the University of Helsinki in 2009 and director for the Center of Excellence for Research on Intersubjectivity in Interaction in 2013. She is now retired.

== Selected publications ==
- Couper-Kuhlen, Elizabeth (1986). An introduction to English prosody. Tübingen: Max Niemeyer. ISBN 3-484-41001-9. OCLC 22519170.
- Couper-Kuhlen, Elizabeth (1993). English Speech Rhythm. Pragmatics & Beyond New Series. Vol. 25. Amsterdam: John Benjamins. doi:10.1075/pbns.25. ISBN 978-90-272-5037-7. ISSN 0922-842X.
- Couper-Kuhlen, Elizabeth; Selting, Margret (1996). Prosody in Conversation: Interactional Studies. Cambridge University Press. ISBN 978-0-511-59786-2. OCLC 967418481.
- Couper-Kuhlen, Elizabeth; Kortmann, Bernd (2000). Cause, Condition, Concession, Contrast: Cognitive and Discourse Perspectives. Berlin: Mouton de Gruyter. ISBN 978-3-11-021904-3. OCLC 560744449.
- Selting, Margret; Couper-Kuhlen, Elizabeth (2001). Studies in interactional linguistics. Amsterdam: John Benjamins. ISBN 0-585-46248-8. OCLC 52752866.
- Couper-Kuhlen, Elizabeth; Ford, Cecilia E. (2004). Sound Patterns in Interaction: Cross-linguistic Studies from Conversation. Amsterdam: John Benjamins. ISBN 978-90-272-9499-9. OCLC 614556451.
- Couper-Kuhlen, Elizabeth; Selting, Margret (2018). Interactional Linguistics: Studying Language in Social Interaction. Cambridge University Press. doi:10.1017/9781139507318. ISBN 9781107032804.
