= Rhetorical structure theory =

Theory of text organization

Rhetorical structure theory (RST) is a theory of text organization that describes relations that hold between parts of text. It was originally developed by William Mann, Sandra Thompson, Christian M. I. M. Matthiessen and others at the University of Southern California's Information Sciences Institute (ISI) and defined in a 1988 paper. The theory was developed as part of studies of computer-based text generation. Natural language processing researchers later began using RST in automatic summarization and other applications. It explains coherence by postulating a hierarchical, connected structure of texts, which are labeled using a small, predefined inventory of relation types - for example, one part of a text may provide an elaboration on another part, provide background or specify a cause for another.

In the 2000s, following the release of the first large-scale dataset implementing the theory, the RST Discourse Treebank (RST-DT), Daniel Marcu demonstrated the feasibility of practical applications of RST to discourse parsing and summarization at ISI. Originally limited to written text, subsequent work in the 2010s expanded RST to spoken language analysis, and the framework has been applied to a variety of languages including Persian, German, Mandarin Chinese, Russian and Spanish. Following the introduction of Transformers, LLMs have been applied to automatic RST parsing, with results approaching human performance on parsing text in English.

== Rhetorical relations ==
Rhetorical relations, also called coherence or discourse relations, are paratactic (coordinate) or hypotactic (subordinate) relations that hold across two or more text spans. The logical arrangement of relations in a text contributes to its coherence by connecting different propositions in a relational structure. RST using rhetorical relations provides a systematic way for an analyst to analyze the underlying intention of a text. The analysis is usually built by reading the text and constructing a tree using the relations. The following example is a title and summary, appearing at the top of an article in Scientific American magazine (adapted from Ramachandran and Anstis, 1986). The original text, broken into numbered units, is:

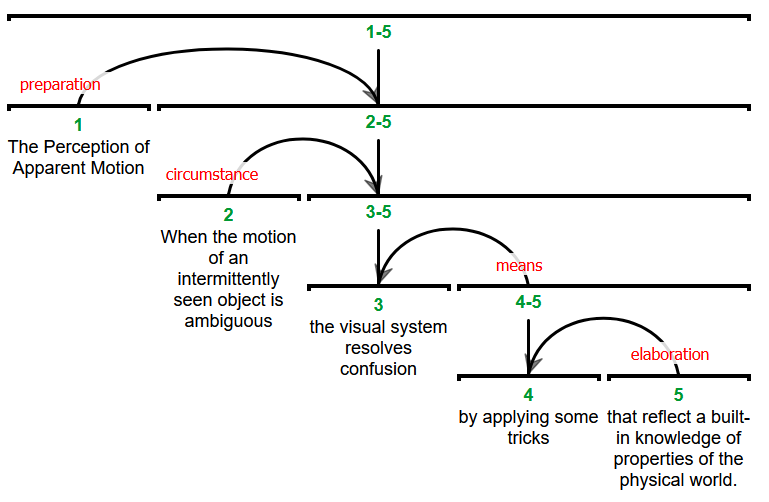
Diagram of an RST analysis

1. [Title:] The Perception of Apparent Motion
2. [Abstract:] When the motion of an intermittently seen object is ambiguous
3. the visual system resolves confusion
4. by applying some tricks
5. that reflect a built-in knowledge of properties of the physical world.

In the figure, the numbers 1-5 show the corresponding units from the text above. Unit 5 provides an "elaboration" on unit 4, and therefore constitutes a less prominent satellite of unit 4, which acts as a nucleus for the relation. Units 4-5 form a relation "Means", explaining the means by which the visual system resolves confusion. Unit 3 is the Central Discourse Unit (CDU) of the text, since all units point to it directly or indirectly. Similarly units 1 and 2 form "preparation" and "circumstance" relations relative to their nuclei. Groups of units which serve as a satellite or nucleus together are called complex discourse units, and always span a set of adjacent EDUs.

== Nuclearity in discourse ==
RST establishes two different types of units. Nuclei are considered as the most important parts of text whereas satellites contribute to the nuclei and are secondary. Nucleus contains basic information and satellite contains additional information about nucleus. The satellite is often incomprehensible without nucleus, whereas a text where satellites have been deleted can be understood to a certain extent.

== Hierarchy in the analysis ==
RST relations are applied recursively in a text, until all units in that text are constituents in an RST relation. The result of such analyses is that RST structure are typically represented as trees, with one top level relation that encompasses other relations at lower levels.

== Why RST? ==
1. From linguistic point of view, RST proposes a different view of text organization than most linguistic theories.
2. RST points to a tight relation between relations and coherence in text
3. From a computational point of view, it provides a characterization of text relations that has been implemented in different systems and for applications as text generation and summarization.

== In design rationale ==
Computer scientists Ana Cristina Bicharra Garcia and Clarisse Sieckenius de Souz have used RST as the basis of a design rationale system called ADD+. In ADD+, RST is used as the basis for the rhetorical organization of a knowledge base, in a way comparable to other knowledge representation systems such as issue-based information system (IBIS). Similarly, RST has been used in representation schemes for argumentation.

== See also ==
- Argument mining
- Parse tree
