= Cajun English =

Dialect of English

- Cajun Vernacular English
- Native to: United States
- Region: Southern Louisiana
- Ethnicity: Cajuns
- Language family: Indo-European: Germanic; West Germanic; North Sea Germanic; Anglo–Frisian; Anglic; English; North American English; American English; Cajun English
- Early forms: Old English: Middle English; Early Modern English
- Writing system: Latin (English alphabet)

Language codes
- ISO 639-3: –
- Glottolog: None
- Acadiana, the traditional Cajun homeland and the stronghold of both the Louisiana French and Cajun English dialects.

Cajun English, or Cajun Vernacular English, is a dialect of American English derived from Cajuns living in Southern Louisiana. Cajun English is significantly influenced by Louisiana French, the historical language of the Cajun people, themselves descended from the French-speaking Acadian people. Still, Cajun English is not merely a transitional dialect between French and English; it is a full dialect of English, and most of its speakers today are monolingual anglophones.

Cajun English is considerably distinct from General American English, with several features of French origin remaining strong, including intonation, vocabulary, and certain accent features. The Cajun accent is frequently described as flat within Cajun Country.

== History ==
Cajun English is spoken throughout Acadiana. Its speakers are often descendants of Acadians from Nova Scotia, Canada, who in 1755, migrated to French-owned Louisiana after the British took control of Nova Scotia and expelled them from their land. In 1803 however, the United States purchased the territory of Louisiana and, in 1812, when Louisiana drafted their first state Constitution in order to be granted statehood, the English language received official sanction as the language of promulgation and preservation of laws. Despite this change, many Cajuns at the time who lived in small towns and were poorly educated, continued to use French exclusively. This isolated them, subjecting them to ridicule and treatment as second-class citizens. In the 1930s, English was the only language taught in schools and students who spoke French were punished and humiliated in front of their class. The Cajuns still continued to use Cajun French at home and in their communities, but this led to a stigma being associated with the language, and, as a result, parents stopped teaching it to their children. The combination of being native French speakers, and the English that the Cajun children were learning during their inconsistent public education, led to the advent of Cajun English.

Many decades later, new generations of Cajuns perceived a loss of cultural identity, and their efforts to recover it started the Cajun Renaissance. The corresponding popularity of Cajun food, music, and festivities have been well received by tourists and some programs are now supported by the state government. Although Cajun English has made a comeback, the bilingualism that originally created it, a knowledge of both French and English, has not. Cajun English speakers in the 21st century typically do not speak French, and experts believe that it is unlikely that this part of the culture will be recovered. French remains mostly used only by the elderly, though it is seeing something of a cultural renaissance. This shift away from bilingualism has changed the source of many of the phonological differences between Cajun English and Standard American English from interference caused by being a native French speaker to markers of Cajun identity.

== Phonology ==
Speech example
An example of a male speaker with a light Cajun accent from St. Martinville (Jeff Landry).

=== Consonants ===
Consonant phonemes in Cajun English are largely the same as they are in other major dialects.

==== Rhoticity ====
Cajun English is traditionally non-rhotic and today variably non-rhotic. A comparison of rhoticity rules between Cajun English, New Orleans English, and Southern American English showed that all three dialects follow different rhoticity rules, and the origin of non-rhoticity in Cajun English, whether it originated from French, English, or an independent process, is uncertain.

==== French-influenced consonants ====
Some unique features certainly influenced by French-language phonology exist in Cajun English:

- Th-stopping: /θ, ð/ can become [t, d] or [tθ, dð]. Thus alveolar stops often replace dental fricatives, a feature used by both Cajun English speakers and speakers of Louisiana French (Standard French speakers generally produce alveolar fricatives only). Examples include bath being pronounced as bat and they as day. This feature leads to a common Louisianian paradigm dis, dat, dese, doze rather than this, that, these, those as a method of describing how Cajuns speak.
- H-dropping: words that begin with the letter /h/ are pronounced without it, so that hair sounds like air, and so on. This has never been universally applied to all words, because /h/ is phonemic in Louisiana French.
- Cajun English speakers traditionally do not aspirate the consonants /p/, /t/, or /k/. As a result, the pat can sound more like bat to speakers of other English varieties.
- Palatalization and/or affrication of /d, t, g, k/ as in Louisiana French.

==== Other consonant features ====
- G-dropping: words like butting can sound like button.
- /l/ tends to be deleted before another consonant sound, so jewelry sounds more like jewry. Can be particularly prominent with all right, which can be rendered on a spectrum from standard pronunciation to [ɑːit] (i.e., aight).
- The /sk/ cluster is commonly metathesized to /ks/ in the word ask.

=== Vowels ===
Cajun English is not subject to the Southern Vowel Shift. Louisiana has a high concentration of people who have a Mary-merry merger, while marry remains distinct. (Notably, /ɛər/ is realized more like /ɛr/ in Louisiana French.) Adoption of the cot–caught merger is uncommon in Louisiana, and studies suggest the same for Cajun English, though at least one study considers the merger possible.

Most pure vowels and diphthongs in English can be nasalized according to nasalization rules. Additionally, loanwords from Louisiana French may include nasalized versions of vowels not found in English.

Vowels of Cajun English
Wikipedia IPA	Cajun	Example words
Pure vowels (Monophthongs)
/æ/	[æ(ː)]	act, pal, trap, ham, pass
/ɑː/	[ɑ]	blah, bother, father, lot, top, wasp
/ɒ/	[ɑ]	blah, bother, father, lot, top, wasp
/ɒ/	[ɒ], [ɒo]	all, dog, bought, loss, saw, taught
/ɔː/	[ɒ], [ɒo]	all, dog, bought, loss, saw, taught
/ɛ/	[ɛ~æ]	dress, met, bread
/ɛ/	[ɪ~ɪ̃]	hem, pen
/ɛ/	[i~ɪ̃]	length
/ə/	[ə]	about, syrup, arena
/ɪ/	[ɪ]	hit, skim, tip
/iː/	[i]	beam, chic, fleet
(/i/)	[ɪ~i]	happy, very
/ʌ/	[ʌ]	bus, flood, what
/ʊ/	[ʊ]	book, put, should
/uː/	[uː]	food, glue, new

Vowels of Cajun English
Wikipedia IPA	Cajun	Example words
Diphthongs
/aɪ/	[ai~ɑː]	ride, shine, try, bright, dice, pike
/aʊ/	[aʊ~aː]	now, ouch, scout
/eɪ/	[eː]	lake, paid, rein
/ɔɪ/	[ɔɪ~ɔː]	boy, choice, moist
/oʊ/	[oː]	goat, oh, show
R-colored vowels
/ɑːr/	[ɑ~ɒ]	barn, car, park
/ɛər/	[ɛə(ɹ) ~ æ(ɹ)]	bare, bear, there
/ɜːr/	[ʌɹ~ʌə]	burn, first, herd
/ər/	[ə(ɹ)]	doctor, martyr, pervade
/ɪr/	[iːə(ɹ)]	fear, peer, tier
/ɪər/	[iːə(ɹ)]	fear, peer, tier
/ɔːr/	[ɔə(ɹ)]	hoarse, horse, war
/ɒr/	[ɑ~ɔ]	orange, tomorrow
/ʊər/	[uə~ʊə]	poor, score, tour
/jʊər/	[uə~ʊə]	cure, Europe, pure

==== Vowel features ====
- The typical American gliding vowels [oʊ] (as in boat), [eɪ] (as in bait), [ʊu] (as in boot), [aʊ~æʊ] (as in bout), [äɪ] (as in bite), and [ɔɪ] (as in boy) have reduced glides or none at all: respectively, [oː], [eː], [uː], [aː~æː], [äː~ɑː], and [ɔː].
- Stress is sometimes placed on the second or last syllable of a word.
- The deletion of any word's final consonant (or consonant cluster), and inclusion of nasal vowels near nasal consonants /m, n, ɲ/ are common, both features being of French influence. Therefore, hand becomes [hæ̝̃], food becomes [fu], rent becomes [ɹɪ̃], New York becomes [nuˈjɔə], and so on. This can expand to heavy nasalization, where nasalization spreads to additional phonemes.

=== Changes over time ===
Some features of Cajun English have changed significantly since the initial adoption of English by Cajuns:

- Non-rhoticity was found to be slightly higher in both monolingual anglophones and French-dominant bilinguals, and does not vary by age, implying that rhoticity in Cajun English has remained relatively constant through time.
- Aspiration of /p, t, k/ is traditionally a rare feature, though it has steadily increased over time (more in line with standard English). However, after the Cajun Renaissance, men still showed less aspiration than women, while women now largely or entirely embrace aspiration.
- Several features show a V-shaped decline and male-based rebound, including nasalization, the glide weakening of /aɪ/ to [ɑː], and th-stopping.

th-stopping Rate (%) by Age and Gender as of 1998
Gender	Old		Middle-Aged		Young	
Gender	/θ/	/ð/	/θ/	/ð/	/θ/	/ð/
Male	44	59	18	43	49	57
Female	39	54	12	8	13	15
Combined	42	57	14	22	34	43

== Vocabulary ==
The inclusion of many loanwords, calques, and phrases from French is typical in Cajun English. French words and phrases are frequently borrowed without changing meaning, but some words have become distinct to Cajun English as opposed to Louisiana French, while others are used frequently enough in English that they don't register as specifically French. Notable and distinctive words used in English include:

Word or phrase	Pronunciation	Origin	Source Word	Definition and Connotation
baw	[bɒ] or sometimes [bɔ]	English	boy	Similar in meaning to bloke in UK English, and used like "guy" or "dude." (e.g. as a greeting, 'Ey baw!)
bayou	[ˈbˤɑːju]	Choctaw?	bayuk	Small river, especially tidal rivers near the coast.
beb	[bɛb]	English, Standard French	babe, bébé	Babe or baby. Can be used to call someone attractive, potentially with less of a sexual connotation than in English. Can also be a general term of endearment, comparable to [beːbɛ] in New Orleans English.
betail, or betaille	[bɪˈtˤɑːi], [bəˈtˤɑːi]	Louisiana French	bétaille	Beast, creature, monster.
bobo	[bobo]	Standard French	bobo	Small injury; scrape, small cut, bruise, insect bite, or a scab.
boo	[buː]	Louisiana French?	bougre	Possibly from Louisiana French bougre, which historically meant "guy." In modern Cajun English, it is a term of endearment, often towards children (e.g. Let me fix that for you, boo.). More commonly used by women.
Cajun Navy		English		Tongue-in-cheek mass noun for decentralized, ad hoc teams who voluntarily assist flood victims with private vehicles and small craft. Originally named during the 2016 Louisiana floods, but had existed as an institution long before then.
cher	[ʃæː]	Louisiana French	cher, pronounced /ʃær/	Dear or darling. Has a variety of meanings; when used as an interjection, it denotes endearment or cuteness (especially between lovers or towards a child or animal). It can also be used as an expression of pity (e.g., poor cher) towards sick or injured children or animals.
couillon	[kujɑ̃]	Louisiana French	couillon	Can have a range of intensity and meanings, including "silly," "idiot," "buffoon", "joker" or "dumbass". Notably, this word is not necessarily insulting as in other dialects of French, and can be used towards children. Frequently spelled couyon (or similar) in English.
coulee	[ˈkuli]	Standard French	coulée	A stream or a large ditch; a small ravine.
cracklins	[kɹæklɪnz]	English	crackling	Snack food made from pork skins.
fais do-do	[fedoˈdo]	Louisiana French	faire, dormir	Refers to late-night dance parties, typically with more traditional music. In French, the literal meaning is a command to go to sleep (as if speaking to a child).
gaw, keeyaw	[gɒː], [kjɒː], [kʼɒː], [gɔː], etc.	Unknown		Interjection expressing surprise, usually about a large amount of something (size, speed, number, etc.). Spelling may vary significantly by pronunciation and orthographic choices.
lagniappe	[lɑɲɑp̚]	Quechua, Spanish	yapay, la ñapa	Gratuity provided by a shop owner to a customer at the time of purchase; something extra.
mais	[me] or sometimes [mɛ]	Standard French	mais	Used as an intensifier, particularly for negative statements or statements that contradict someone else. (e.g. Mais I don't know!)
nekkid	[nɛkɪd]	English	naked	Naked. Carries a connotation of a humorous or scandalous context.
New Iberia haircut		English		Derisive or humorous name for a variant of the Ceasar haircut common in Cajun country. Used to make fun of the perceived lower class and distinct mannerisms of the people who tend to get Ceasar cuts.
nonc	[nɑ̃ŋk̚] or [nɑ̃ŋk]	Louisiana French	noncle, mon oncle	Uncle.
nutria, nutria rat	[ˈnuːtɹiə], [ˈnuːtɹə]	Spanish	nutria	Invasive semi-aquatic rodent from South America. Generally viewed as undesirable and somewhat disgusting due to its invasive status.
parrain	[pɑˈɹɛ̃]	Standard French	parrain	Godfather, or more generally, a man playing a similar role in a child's life.
poo-yaille	[ˈpujɒːi]			An interjection expressing exhaustion or exasperation.
potnuh	[ˈpˤɑt̚nə]	English	partner	Buddy. Can be ironic or carry a humorous, overbearing connotation. Spelling can vary, (e.g., podnuh, padnah).
T or tee	[tʰi]	Standard French	petit	In English, this connotes familiarity, usually between or towards men. Can be used in isolation as either a nickname or a stand-in for a first name (e.g., What's good, Tee?), combined with a first name to form a nickname (e.g., I saw T-Sean yesterday), or combined with "boy" to mean "guy" or "dude" for strangers, or "buddy" for friends (e.g. Check out T-boy over there!).
zoie, zwah	[zwɑ]	Standard French	oie	Silly or foolish person.

== Grammar ==
There are several phrases used by Cajuns that are not used by non-Cajun speakers. Some common phrases are listed below:

=== Zero copula ===
Cajun English also has the tendency to drop the auxiliary verb to be in the third person singular (is) and the second person singular and plurals. For example, She pretty and What we doing?.

=== When you went? ===
Instead of "When did you go?"

=== Bare-root verb forms ===
-s and -ed word endings for the third person singular and the past tense morpheme tend to be dropped. Native Francophone men among the earliest Cajun English speakers had a strong tendency to drop -s and -ed endings. These men dropped -s endings at a rate (65%) similar to AAVE, and dropped -ed endings at an even higher rate (81%) than with AAVE. Younger speakers continue to drop -s and -ed at lower rates, but still more often than Southern American English, even when they spoke English natively. This has been attributed to morphological influences from French, but may be a consequence of final consonant dropping instead.

Examples:

 He stay two months.
 She go with it.

=== Duplication ===
Adjectives can be reduplicated as an intensifier.

 Kyaw! That car was fast, fast!

Pronoun duplication is used to emphasize the personal aspect of a phrase. This is based in Louisiana French, and is less common with younger speakers.

 When you want to leave, you?

=== yeah and no as intensifiers ===
yeah and no can serve as intensifiers to a declarative statement when added to the end, a feature taken from French. The final word in the statement is stressed, while yeah/no are given a falling intonation.

 I told you not to. You gonna regret it, yeah!

=== "at" with "where" ===
At can be added to where questions as an intensifier, a trait held in common with New Orleans English.

 Where my shoes at, baw?

=== "to" instead of "at" ===
Cajun English speakers may use to instead of at when referring to locations.

 I was to the store when I saw her.

=== "for" instead of "at" ===
Cajun English speakers exhibit a tendency to use for instead of at when referring to time.

 I'll be there for 2 o'clock.

Given the connection between Cajun English and Acadia, this is also seen among Canadian English speakers.

=== Colloquial Constructions ===
"Come see" is the equivalent of saying "come here" regardless of whether or not there is something to "see." The French "viens voir," or "venez voir," meaning "come" or "please come," is often used in Cajun French to ask people to come. This phrasing may have its roots in "viens voir ici" (IPA: [isi]), the French word for "here."

To "save the dishes" means to "put away the dishes into cupboards where they belong after being washed". While dishes are the most common subject, it is not uncommon to save other things. For example: Save up the clothes, saving the tools, save your toys.

"Getting/Running down at the store" involves stepping out of a car to enter the store. Most commonly, the driver will ask the passenger, "Are you getting/running down (also)?" One can get down at any place, not just the store. The phrase "get down" may come from the act of "getting down from a horse" as many areas of Acadiana were only accessible by horse well into the 20th century. It also may originate from the French language descendre meaning to get down, much as some English-Spanish bilingual speakers say "get down," from the Spanish bajar.

"Makin' groceries" is a calque from French to mean the act of buying groceries, rather than that of manufacturing them. The confusion originates from the direct translation of the American French phrase "faire l'épicerie" which is understood by speakers to mean "to do the grocery shopping." "Faire" as used in the French language can mean either "to do" or "to make."

== In popular culture ==
Louisiana accents (including Cajun English) are notoriously difficult for actors to replicate, so portrayals in media vary widely in credibility.

=== Television ===
- In the television series Swamp People, Troy Landry speaks with a strong native Cajun accent.
- In the television series True Blood, the character René Lenier has a Cajun accent.
- In the television miniseries Band of Brothers, the company's medic Eugene Roe is half-Cajun and speaks with a distinct accent.
  - Likewise, Merriell "Snafu" Shelton from a companion miniseries The Pacific.
- The Marvel Comics superhero Remy LeBeau / Gambit is from New Orleans and speaks with a thick Cajun accent; this is depicted in most of his animated adaptations, such as X-Men: The Animated Series, X-Men: Evolution, Wolverine and the X-Men, and X-Men '97.
- Adam Ruins Everything features a recurring bit-character who speaks in a Cajun dialect, with subtitles.
- In the Heat of the Night: Season 2, Episode 12; "A.K.A. Kelly Kay"; Jude Thibodeaux (Kevin Conway) comes to Sparta in search of a former prostitute he controlled in New Orleans. Cajun accent is prominent.
- On King of the Hill, Bill Dauterive's cousin Gilbert is supposed to speak with a high-class older Southern accent, sometimes with Cajun influences.

=== Film ===
- In the film The Blind Side, Ed Orgeron, a Cajun who coached the film and book's subject Michael Oher during the latter's college career, plays himself and uses his native dialect.
- The film Southern Comfort includes supporting cast with native Cajun accents.
- In the Marvel Studios film Deadpool & Wolverine, Remy LeBeau / Gambit (played by Channing Tatum) speaks with a thick Cajun accent as he does in other multimedia adaptations.
- In the animated film The Princess and the Frog, Ray the Firefly (voiced by Jim Cummings) speaks Cajun English.
- In the movie The Big Easy, New Orleans or Cajun accents are used by some characters, with different levels of credibility.
- In the movie The Green Mile, Eduard Delacroix (played by Michael Jeter) supposedly speaks Cajun English.
- In the film Joe Dirt, in one scene while looking for his parents in Louisiana, David Spade's character interacts with a Cajun man (Farmer Fran) played by Blake Clark who supposedly uses a thick Cajun accent.
- In the film Deepwater Horizon, Donald Vidrine (played by John Malkovich) supposedly speaks Cajun English.
- In the film The Waterboy, Cajun English is supposedly spoken throughout.

=== Video games ===
- Several characters of Gabriel Knight: Sins of the Fathers, particularly the narrator, have Cajun accents. Some characters even use Cajun French phrases.
- Virgil from Left 4 Dead 2 speaks with a Cajun-accent and uses some Cajun English wording during the Swamp Fever finale to The Parish beginning campaigns.
- Teruteru Hanamura from Danganronpa 2: Goodbye Despair speaks with a Cajun accent and uses common phrases in the latter half of the first Class Trial.
- Drifter from Deadlock has a Cajun accent and uses common phrases in his voice lines

== See also ==
- Dialects of the English Language
- Acadian French, the dialect of French from which Cajun French derives
- Louisiana French
- Louisiana Creole, a French-based creole which has had some influence on Cajun French and English
- New Orleans English, another Louisiana dialect of English which includes multiple accents such as Yat.

== Resources ==
- PBS American Accent series – Cajun

== Bibliography ==
- Dubois, Sylvia; Horvath, Barbara M. (2004). "Cajun Vernacular English: phonology". In Schneider, Edgar W. (ed.). A Handbook of Varieties of English: A Multimedia Reference Tool. Vol. 1. New York: Mouton de Gruyter. pp. 407–416. doi:10.1515/9783110175325. ISBN 978-3-11-019718-1.
- Valdman, Albert (2009). Dictionary of Louisiana French. University Press of Mississippi. ISBN 9781604734034.
- Papen, R.A.; Rottet, K.J. (1997). "A Structural Sketch of the Cajun French Spoken in Lafourche and Terrebonne Parishes". In Valdman, Albert (ed.). French and Creole in Louisiana. Boston: Springer. pp. 71–108. doi:10.1007/978-1-4757-5278-6_4. ISBN 978-1-4419-3262-4.
- Reaser, Jeffrey; Wilbanks, Eric; Wojcik, Karissa; Wolfram, Walt (2018). "Variable r-Lessness in Cajun English". Language Variety in the New South: Contemporary Perspectives on Change and Variation. UNC Press Books. pp. 135–152. ISBN 978-1-4696-3881-2.
- Walton, Shana (December 2, 1994). Flat Speech and Cajun Ethnic Identity in Terrebonne Parish, Louisiana (Ph.D. thesis). Tulane University.
