= Interactional linguistics =

Usage-based approach to linguistic structures

Interactional linguistics (IL) is an interdisciplinary approach to grammar and interaction in the field of linguistics that applies the methods of Conversation Analysis to the study of linguistic structures, including syntax, phonetics, morphology, and so on. Interactional linguistics is based on the principle that linguistic structures and uses are formed through interaction, and it aims at understanding how languages are shaped through interaction. The approach focuses on temporality, activity implication, and embodiment in interaction. Interactional linguistics asks research questions such as "How are linguistic patterns shaped by interaction?" and "How do linguistic patterns themselves shape interaction?".

== History ==
Interactional linguistics is partly a development within conversation analysis focusing on linguistic research questions, partly a development of Emergent grammar or West Coast functional grammar. The two approaches can be seen as effectively merged into interactional linguistics, but also with interactional sociolinguistics.

=== Conversation analysis ===
While conversation analysis did indeed study language since its beginning, it grew out of sociology and often dealt with sociological research questions and topics. However, over time the use of ideas and methods from conversation analysis for linguistic research questions grew. Some early uses of the term Interactional Linguistics are found in the title of a 1995 conference with the titleand the 2000 conference Interactional Linguistics: Euro-conference on the Linguistic Organisation of Conversational Activities and in the 2001 book Studies in Interactional Linguistics by Elizabeth Couper-Kuhlen and Margret Selting. They mark a development that most clearly took place in the 90s through the publication of various edited volumes - most importantly the book Interaction and Grammar edited by Elinor Ochs, Emanuel Schegloff and Sandra Thompson.

While there is no agreed-upon delineation between the two, interactional linguistics is characterized by looking at linguistic structures and employing linguistic terminology for its description of what interactants orient to (and not only looking at e.g. gesture). It goes against earlier approaches where research was focused on investigating written language. With the improvement of technology, linguists have started to focus on spoken language as well due to its functions in intonation and transcription system. Though the functional linguistic study was not all about conversational interaction, it was really helpful for the language study, which saw linguistic form as being useful on the situated occasion of use. The next step which made interactional linguistics develop was the important work on conversation analysis. Some sociologists were saying the study of everyday language was the essence of social order; some other kinds of discourse were said to be understood as habituations of the fundamental conversational order. The term talk-in-interaction was created as an inclusive term for all of natural speech exchange.

=== Emergent grammar and West Coast functional grammar ===
Emergent grammar was proposed by Paul Hopper and postulates that rules of grammar come about as language is spoken and used. This is contrary to the a priori grammar postulate, the idea that grammar rules exist in the mind before the production of utterances. Compared to the principles of generative grammar and the concept of Universal Grammar, interactional linguistics asserts that grammar emerges from social interaction. Whereas Universal Grammar claims that features of grammar are innate, emergent grammar and other interactional theories claim that the human language faculty has no innate grammar and that features of grammar are learned through experience and social interaction.

== Relations to linguistic theories ==
Interactional linguistics has connections to various linguistic approaches, such as discourse analysis and conversation analysis, and is used to investigate the relationship between grammatical structure and real-time interaction and language use. Further, the topic of normativity in a discourse or a social norm both contribute to how a conversation functions. Interactional linguists contrast their perspectives with that of "traditional structuralist descriptions".

Scholars in interactional linguistics draw from functional linguistics, conversation analysis, and linguistic anthropology in order to describe "the way in which language figures in everyday interaction and cognition" and Interactional Linguistics may be considered a usage-based approach to language. Studies in interactional linguistics view linguistic forms, including syntactic and prosodic structures, as greatly affected by interactions among participants in speech, signing, or other language use. The field contrasts with dominant approaches to linguistics during the twentieth century, which tended to focus either on the form of language per se, or on theories of individual language user's linguistic competence. Various scholars have or are attempting to write grammar books from an interactional linguistic perspective, for languages such as Alto Perené and Danish (See Samtalegrammatik.dk).

Interactional linguistics can also be considered compatible with construction grammar and cognitive grammar. Wolfgang Imo has coined the term Interactional Construction Grammar on the recognition of similarities between construction grammar and interactional linguistics. Interactional linguistics does not subscribe to the strict separation of competence and performance of generative grammar. Methodically, it takes what would be considered "performance" as the empirical starting point.
