= Who dat? =

Alternative pronunciation of the question "who's that?"

Who dat? is an alternative pronunciation of the question "who's that?"

Originally popularized on stage in vaudeville, starting in the late 70's to the early 80's has become a chant of team support. It is most widely used by fans of the New Orleans Saints, an American football team of the National Football League (NFL). The entire chant is: "Who dat? Who dat? Who dat say dey gonna beat dem Saints?" "Who dat" may also be used as a noun, describing a Saints fan.

== Origins ==
The earliest documented use of the phrase in Louisiana can be found in a July 30, 1852, New Orleans Daily Picayune article.

The chant of "who dat?" originated in minstrel shows and vaudeville acts of the late 19th and early 20th centuries and was taken up by jazz and big band performers in the 1920s and '30s.

Early references to "who dat?" can be found in the 19th century in the poetry of Paul Laurence Dunbar, first in his poem "When Malindy Sings" and later in his lyrics to the song "Who Dat Say Chicken in Dis Crowd," a featured song in Clorindy: The Origin of the Cakewalk, an "operetta" by Dunbar and Will Marion Cook that was first presented as part of E.E. Rice's 1898 show "Summer Nights". A common tag line in the days of Negro minstrel shows was: "Who dat?" answered by "Who dat say who dat?" Many different blackfaced gags played off that opening. Vaudeville performer Mantan Moreland was known for the routine. Another example is "Swing Wedding", a 1930s Harman-Ising cartoon musical, which caricatured Fats Waller, Cab Calloway, Bill "Bojangles" Robinson, Ethel Waters, and the Mills Brothers as frogs in a swamp performing minstrel show jokes and jazz tunes. The frogs repeatedly used the phrase "who dat?"

In the swing era, "who dat" chants back and forth between the band and the band leader or between the audience and the band were extemporaneous. That is, there was no one specific set of words except for the two magic ones.

"Who Dat?" lyrics from 1937:

Who dat up there who's dat down there

Who dat up there who dat well down there
Who's dat up there, sayin' who's dat down there
When I see you up there well who's dat down there

Who dat inside who's dat outside
Who's dat inside who dat well outside
Who's dat inside, singin' who's dat outside
When I see up there well who's dat out there

Button up your lip there big boy
Stop answerin' back
Give you a tip there big boy
Announce yourself jack

Who dat up there who's dat down there
Who dat up there who dat, well down there
Who's dat up there, singin' who's dat down there
When I see you up there you bum
Well who's dat down there

Who dat

Staged minstrel skits featured frightened African American characters saying "who dat" when they encountered a ghost, or someone imitating a ghost. Then, the "who dat"–"who dat say who dat" skit would play itself out. This skit was done frequently in short reels from the 1930s to 1950s and in some early TV shows too. Even the Marx Brothers had a "who dat" routine, which they included in their film A Day at the Races. "Who Dat Man? Why It's Gabriel!" Often, a ghost was called a "who dat." Metro-Goldwyn-Mayer's animated character Bosko once had such an encounter in a 1938 toon called "Lil Ol Bosko in Bagdad." In 1941 Butterfly McQueen infamously delivered what African American film historian Donald Bogle described as what "might be the most demeaning line ever uttered by a black in the movies" when she said, "Who dat say who dat when I say who dat?" in the movie Affectionately Yours.

"Who dat?" became a familiar joke with soldiers during World War II.

Back in WWII, U.S. fighter squadron pilots would often fly under radio silence. But things get lonely up there in the cockpit, so after a while there'd be a crackle of static as someone keyed his mike. Then a disembodied voice would reply, "Who dat?" An answer would come, "Who dat say who dat?" And another, "Who dat say who dat when ah say who dat?" After a few rounds of this, the squadron commander would grab his microphone and yell, "Cut it out, you guys!" A few moments of silence. Then... "Who dat?"

== Origins of the "who dat?" chant ==
"Who dat" became part of a chant for fans cheering on their favorite team. It has been debated exactly where it started, but some claim it began with Southern University Jaguars fans either in the late 1960s or early 1970s and went "Who dat talkin' 'bout beatin' dem Jags?" Another claim is that it was connected with St. Augustine High School, a historically African-American all-boys Catholic high school in New Orleans.

A number of early football-related "who dat" references come from the Acadiana region, where Cajun English speakers influenced by French sometimes replace th sounds with d. One common theory is that the cheer originated at Patterson High School in Patterson, Louisiana, home of future Louisiana State University and Saints running back Dalton Hilliard. A 1979 article in the Morgan City Daily Review, previewing the Patterson Lumberjacks' appearance in the state championship game, noted that "you hear 'the who-dat' cheers by every 'Jack fan at all the games." Patterson High fans were described as "the 'Who Dat' Club" and "Who Dats."

A 1979 sports story describes "who dat talking about beating those horses?" as a "popular cheer" at Peabody Magnet High School (home of the Warhorses) in Alexandria. In 1980, a Crowley Post-Signal story said "Who dat talkin' bout beatin' dem Dogs? Who dat?" was a "familiar Ville Platte cheer."

Another claimant is Alcorn State University, the historically black college in Mississippi. In 1980, a news story described "Who dat, who dat, who dat talkin' 'bout beatin' dose Braves!?" as its "traditional chant printed on placards" at a basketball game. Another 1980 story on Jackson's Murrah High School said its basketball team "has become an Alcorn State clone with 'Who dat?' cheers."

Fans at LSU also picked up on the cheer. Fans of professional wrestler Junkyard Dog, a star on the Mid-South Wrestling circuit from 1979 to 1984 who frequently appeared in events at the Louisiana Superdome and Municipal Auditorium in New Orleans, had a similar chant: "Who dat think they gonna beat that Dog".

By 1983 the cheer had become so popular among fans that the New Orleans Saints organization officially adopted it during the tenure of coach Bum Phillips, and Aaron Neville (along with local musicians Sal and Steve Monistere and Carlo Nuccio) recorded a version of "When the Saints Go Marching In" that incorporated the chant of "Who dat say dey gonna beat dem Saints" (performed by a group of Saints players). The song quickly became a major local hit, due in part to the support of sportscaster Ron Swoboda and the fact that Saints fans had been using the chant for some time.

Meanwhile, in about 1981 Cincinnati Bengals fans and players had started with their similar "Who Dey" cheer ("Who Dey think gonna beat them Bengals?"). In a 2006 article, Toni Monkovic, a New York Times writer, speculated that the 1981 popularity of the Bengals' "who dey" may have led Saints fans to expand their use of "who dat", from the "small number, and possibly a very small number" of Saints fans using it in the late 1970s to the much wider use of the chant in 1983. Monkovic noted that the fan bases of the two teams continue to disagree about this, and that ultimately the evidence is unclear. However, this speculation seems unlikely to be accurate as the "Who Dat" chant was so common at nearby LSU months before Cincinnati's 1981 Super Bowl run that a song called "Who Dat" had been written (in March 1981) to the tune of Frankie Smith's "Double Dutch Bus" and played regularly on local radio, in conjunction with the LSU men's basketball team's Final Four run.

== "Who dat?" spin-off chants ==
After the Saints won the NFC Championship Game on January 24, 2010, against the Minnesota Vikings in the Superdome, fans from all across New Orleans, including fans who were exiting the game, started a Mardi Gras-style "who dat" on Bourbon Street with modified lyrics, chanting, "who dat, who dat, who dat in the Super Bowl!" in reference to the Saints advancing to the Super Bowl for the first time ever in their 43-year history. In Super Bowl XLIV, on February 7, 2010, the Saints beat the Indianapolis Colts 31–17. "Drew Dat" has occasionally been used in honor of quarterback Drew Brees.

The Cincinnati Bengals use a modified version.

== Who Dat Nation ==
In recent years the phrase "Who Dat Nation" has become a popular term for the entire community of Saints fans. According to Bobby Hebert, formerly a Saints quarterback and currently a sports commentator in New Orleans, the term "Who Dat Nation" originated after a highly anticipated 2006 game between the Saints and the favored Dallas Cowboys, which the Saints won; after the game, listeners from a wide geographic range called into Hebert's radio show on WWL (AM), and Hebert commented, "Man, there's a whole Who Dat Nation out there."

== Ownership controversy ==
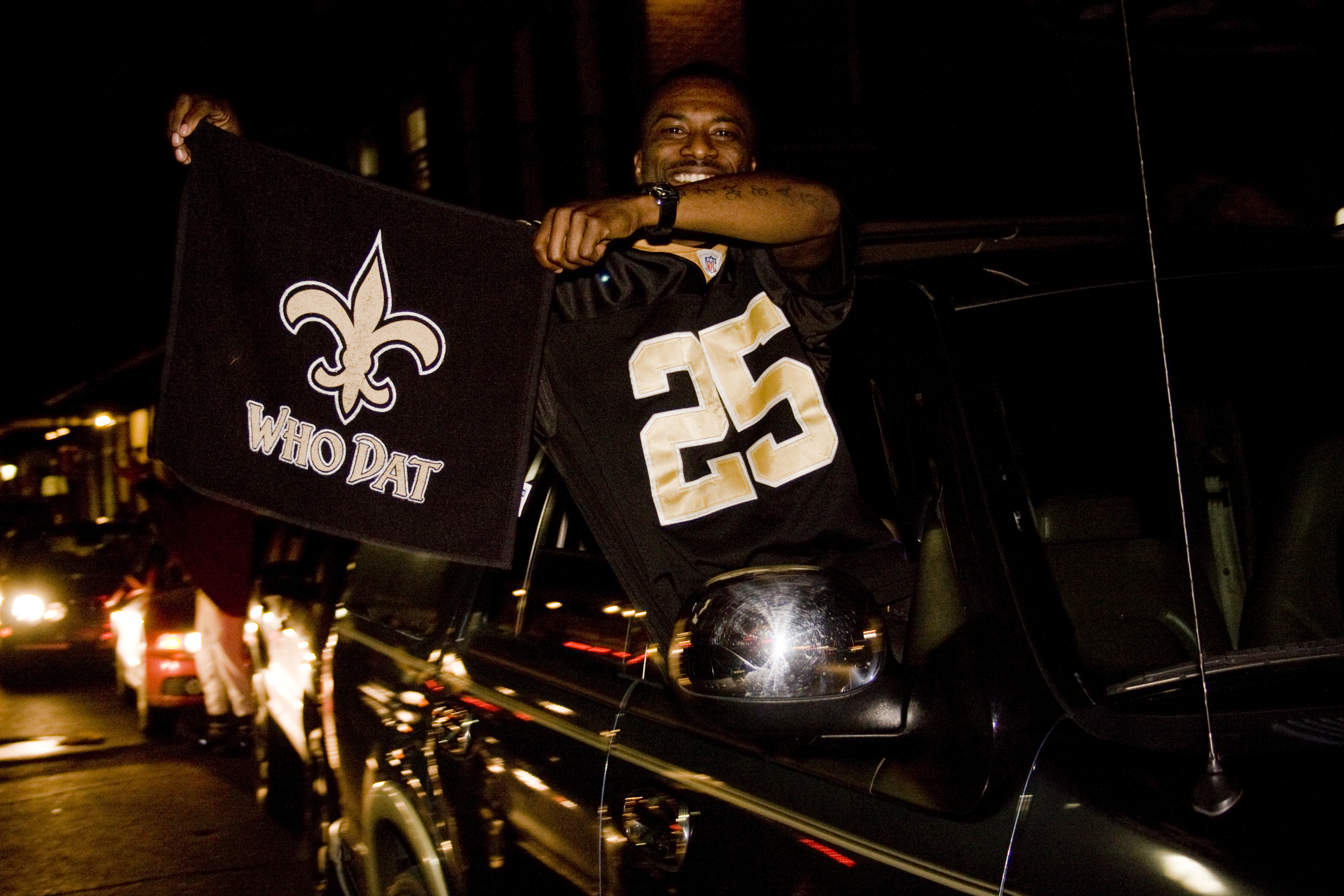
Fans in New Orleans celebrating New Orleans Saints Super Bowl victory.

In January 2010, the NFL sent cease and desist letters to several Louisiana T-shirt shop owners ordering them to cease producing T-shirts bearing the phrase "who dat". According to some recipients of these letters, the NFL was claiming to own the trademark to the term "Who dat", and that unlicensed T-shirts bearing the phrase would cause confusion among fans of the Saints about the official status of the merchandise. On January 27 one company tweeted about their whodat tee shirt cease and desist order from the NFL, and NewOrleans.com and HuffPost interviewed the Monisteres about the NFL's claims in relation to their company Who Dat?, Inc. The next day, the brothers released a statement claiming rights to the phrase to NewOrleans.com, which they registered in 1983 after recording the version of "When the Saints Go Marching In" that incorporated the chant. The Monistere's record is listed as inactive, meaning that it was not renewed upon expiration. The Saints organization, through their company The New Orleans Louisiana Saints Limited Partnership, also registered the mark "Who Dat" in 1988 when used in conjunction with "fleur-de-lis design", but later the Saints released their claim of ownership to WhoDat, Inc., asserting that they owned the phrase.

The NFL's action also provoked responses from U.S. Senator David Vitter and Congressman Charlie Melancon of Louisiana, among others. Vitter sent a formal letter to NFL Commissioner Roger Goodell criticizing the NFL's attempt to claim ownership of the chant, informing Goodell he would be printing T-shirts using the phrase, and daring the NFL to sue him. It was later reported that the NFL had responded to Vitter's letter, stating that it was only seeking to prevent unauthorized uses of "Who Dat?" together with other identifying marks of the Saints.

Louisiana Attorney General Buddy Caldwell called the NFL and had a conversation about the ownership of the "who dat" slogan and of the fleur-de-lis. Caldwell said the bottom line from the legal back-and-forth with the league is that the NFL "is conceding it has no exclusive rights to the fleur-de-lis and no exclusive rights to 'who dat' and offshoots of "who dat," and no exclusive rights to the colors black and gold." Caldwell said his office was drafting a document to be signed by the state and the NFL outlining what is and is not allowable.

On March 4, 2010, the Monisteres' company, Who Dat? Inc., filed suit in federal court against the Saints, NFL Properties, and the state of Louisiana, alleging improper interference with their business interests. The suit alleges: in 1987 the New Orleans Saints were granted a license by Who Dat?, Inc. to use the "who dat" phrase; in that agreement, the Saints agreed that the mark was original and that Monistere was the first use owner of the trademark; the Saints also agreed to never challenge Monistere's ownership of the mark or aid any one else in doing so; and the Saints were to also help protect the mark from infringement by others on behalf of the licensors (Who Dat?, Inc.). Who Dat? Inc. subsequently amended their complaint to name several local retailers as defendants, most notably Fleurty Girl, and the matter was set for initial hearing in the U.S. District Court for the Eastern District of Louisiana on November 10, 2010.

In January 2012, it was reported that the NFL and the Monisteres had agreed to dismiss their claims against each other and to cooperate in the production of "co-branded merchandise". The lawsuit continued as to some of the other defendants, pending hearing of their motions to dismiss the case. In October 2012 it was reported that the remaining parties had settled the case on confidential terms. According to one attorney and restaurant owner who had been a party to the case, "The net effect of the settlement is that nobody owns Who Dat".

== Recorded versions ==
- Who Dat – Spose
- Who Dat? – Aaron Neville
- Who Dat (Going to the Super Bowl) – Ashley Forrestier
- Who Dat – Royal Crown Revue
- Dat "Who Dat" Jazz – Olympia Brass Band
- Who Let the Dogs Out (Who Dat remix) – Baha Men/Clear Channel New Orleans
- The Who Dat Roll – Williams Riley
- Who Dat? – Young Jeezy
- Who Dat? Tom Tom Club
- Who Dat David Frizzell, No. 60 Country hit in 1984
- Who Dat – J. Cole
- Who Dat Girl – Flo Rida
- Who Dat Boy – Tyler, The Creator
- Who Dat..Monster Talk – Bobby Orlando

The 1966 single "Please Forget Her"/"Who Dat?" by The Jury, from Winnipeg, Manitoba, is pure coincidence and completely unrelated.

== In hip hop ==
In 2008, New Orleans based artist Lil Wayne referenced the chant in his hit single "A Milli" where he raps Who dat say dey gonna beat Lil Wayne even though he is a Green Bay Packers fan.

In 2009, New Orleans based artist K. Gates recorded "Black and Gold (Who Dat)" based on Ying Yang Twins' "Halftime (Get Crunk)".

"Who dat" is also used in the song "Holla Back" by New Orleans-based rapper Juvenile: "They want a pimp to give them some money, but I don't do that. But baby I'm a Saints fan that's why I say who dat."

"Who Dat" is the name of the 8th single from 2008 The Recession by Young Jeezy. They say who dat?

JT Money has a 1999 single called "Who Dat". The song was a hit, but was likely not intended to have any relation to the Saints or Vaudeville.

In 2009, New Orleans rapper Birdman chants a "Who Dat". in the Single Wasted(Remix) by Gucci Mane featuring Birdman, Jadakiss and Lil Wayne.

In 2010, rapper J. Cole recorded a song called "Who Dat".

In 2010, New Orleans native, Ashley Forrestier released "Who Dat (Going to the Super Bowl)" celebrating the New Orleans Saints 31-28 Overtime Win over the Minnesota Vikings in the 2009-10 NFC Championship Game.

In 2012, Bay Area based rapper G-Eazy, in collaboration with artists Mod Sun and Meta, released the song "Rappin' A$$ Rappers" in which G-Eazy raps "livin' in New Orleans where dem people holla 'Who Dat'". He also refers to the chant in his 2019 song "Throw Fits" with London on da Track, where he raps, "In the Bay, we say, "Yee," in New Orleans, they say, "Who Dat?"

Australian hip-hop artist Iggy Azalea has employed the refrain in several songs, including "Fancy" and "Leave It", drawing criticism from some who perceive an appropriation of Southern Black culture.

== Other references ==
A deepwater oil and gas field in the Gulf of Mexico, discovered in 2007, was named "Who Dat" by its developer, LLOG Exploration Co., based in New Orleans. The field, encompassing Mississippi Canyon Blocks 503, 504 and 547 in about 3,000 feet of water, began production in 2011.
