= Current Issues in Linguistic Theory =

1964 book by Noam Chomsky

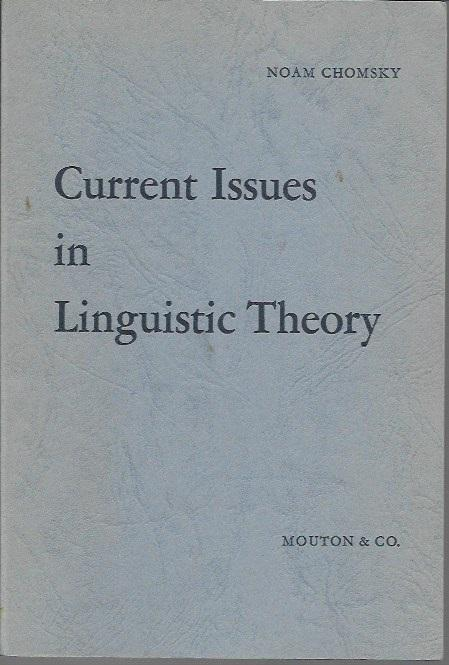
- First edition cover
- Author: Noam Chomsky
- Language: English
- Subject: Linguistics
- Published: 1964
- Publication place: United States
- Media type: Print (Hardcover and Paperback)
- Pages: 119
- ISBN: 978-9027907004

Current Issues in Linguistic Theory is a 1964 book by American linguist Noam Chomsky. It is a revised and expanded version of "The Logical Basis of Linguistic Theory", a paper that Chomsky presented in the ninth International Congress of Linguists held in Cambridge, Massachusetts in 1962. It is a short monograph of about a hundred pages, similar to Chomsky's earlier Syntactic Structures (1957). In Aspects of the Theory of Syntax (1965), Chomsky presents many of its ideas in a more elaborate manner.

== Overview ==
Chomsky places emphasis on the capacity of human languages to create new sentences in an infinite manner. To him, this creativity is an essential characteristic of languages in general. Chomsky boldly proclaims that this creativity is the "central fact to which any significant linguistic theory must address itself". He adds that any "theory of language that neglects this 'creative' aspect is of only marginal interest". Chomsky then calls the existing structuralist linguistic theory of his time a "taxonomic" enterprise which limited itself within a narrow scope to become an "inventory of elements", not an inventory of underlying rules. In doing so, this "far too oversimplified" linguistic model "seriously underestimates the richness of structure of language and the generative processes that underlie it". After dismissing the existing theories, Chomsky attempts to show that his newly invented "transformational generative grammar" model is "much closer to the truth".

== Scope and depth of linguistic analysis ==
Chomsky defines three levels of success for any linguistic theory. These are "observational adequacy" (i.e. correctly picking out the valid linguistic data that linguists must work on), "descriptive adequacy" (i.e. assigning clear structural description to elements of sentences) and "explanatory adequacy" (i.e. justifying, with the help of a principled basis, the selection of a descriptive grammar for a language).

Chomsky states that much of modern structural linguistics in the first half of the 20th century were preoccupied with observational adequacy. He also states that descriptive adequacy could technically be achieved by a set of structural descriptions (like a computer program) that cover all linguistic data in an ad hoc manner. But for Chomsky this still gives us little insight into the nature of linguistic structure. Therefore a comprehensive coverage of all data in the "observational adequacy" or all structural descriptions at the "descriptive adequacy" level would not be worthwhile nor interesting. A successful linguistic theory must achieve the higher level of "explanatory adequacy", describing the distinctive features of a natural language as opposed to any set of structural descriptions. For Chomsky, considering the stage where linguistics was at the time, such depth of analysis seemed more important than ever-broadening scope.

== Reception ==
According to the British linguist John Earl Joseph, the paper "secured [Chomsky's] international reputation in linguistics".

== Works cited ==
- Chomsky, Noam (1964), Current Issues in Linguistic Theory, The Hague: Mouton, ISBN 9783110867565 – via Internet Archive
- Joseph, John Earl (2003), "Rethinking Linguistic Creativity", in Hayley G. Davis, Talbot J. Taylor (ed.), Rethinking Linguistics, London: Routledge, pp. 121–150, ISBN 9781135788643
