= Functional shift =

Words taking on new syntactic functions, such as parts of speech

In linguistics, functional shift occurs when an existing word takes on a new syntactic function. If no change in form occurs, it is called a zero derivation. For example, the word like, formerly only used as a preposition in comparisons (as in "eats like a pig"), is now also used in the same way as the subordinating conjunction as in many dialects of English (as in "sounds like he means it"). The boundary between functional shift and conversion (the derivation of a new word from an existing word of identical form) is not well-defined, but it could be construed that conversion changes the lexical meaning and functional shift changes the syntactic meaning.

Shakespeare uses functional shift, for example using a noun to serve as a verb. Researchers found that this technique allows the brain to understand what a word means before it understands the function of the word within a sentence.
