= Bernd Kortmann =

German professor of English linguistics

Bernd Kortmann (born 22 March 1960) is a German professor of English linguistics.

== Academic career ==
Kortmann was born on 22 March 1960 in Kaltenkirchen, a town located 35 km north of Hamburg, in the German state of Schleswig-Holstein.

He earned his PhD at Leibniz University Hannover in 1989 and his Habilitation (Germany's highest university degree) at the Free University of Berlin in 1994. The following year, he became a full professor at the University of Freiburg.

From 1997 until 1999, Kortmann was dean of the Faculty of Philology at the University of Freiburg. Since 2003, he has been the chair of the Sprachlehrinstitut ("Language Teaching Centre") of the University of Freiburg and a board member of the Hermann Paul Centre of Linguistics. Furthermore, Kortmann was director of the graduate program Master of European Linguistics from 2004 until 2014. From April 2008 until September 2009, he was a senior research fellow at the School of Language and Literature at the Freiburg Institute for Advanced Studies (FRIAS). In December 2013, he was appointed director of the humanities and social sciences at FRIAS. Since 2015, he has been the spokesperson of the FRIAS board of directors.

From 1996 to 1999, Kortmann was secretary of the Deutsche Gesellschaft für Sprachwissenschaft (German Linguistic Society). In 2014, he was elected a member of the Academia Europaea. That same year he was awarded an honorary doctorate by the University of Eastern Finland.

== Research topics ==
Kortmann researched on topics like semantics, grammaticalization, typology, language history and English grammar. He published numerous works in these fields of study, including the two-volume reference book A Handbook of Varieties of English, the digital World Atlas of Varieties of English, more than 90 articles and reviews, as well as many other works. His research interests include typology of languages, corpus linguistics and varieties of English on the British Isles.

== Publications (selection) ==
- Free Adjuncts and Absolutes in English: Problems of Control and Interpretation. Routledge, London / New York 1991.
- Adverbial Subordination: A Typology and History of Adverbial Subordinators Based on European Languages. Mouton de Gruyter, Berlin / New York 1997.
- (Co-editor, co-author): A Handbook of Varieties of English (2 volumes). de Gruyter, Berlin / New York 2004.
- (Co-editor): A Comparative Grammar of British English Dialects: Agreement, Gender, Relative Clauses. de Gruyter, Berlin / New York 2005.
- English Linguistics: Essentials, Berlin: Cornelsen, 2005, ISBN 3464311627

Furthermore, Kortmann is co-editor of the publication series Topics in English Linguistics.
