= Lagniappe =

Item of gratuity

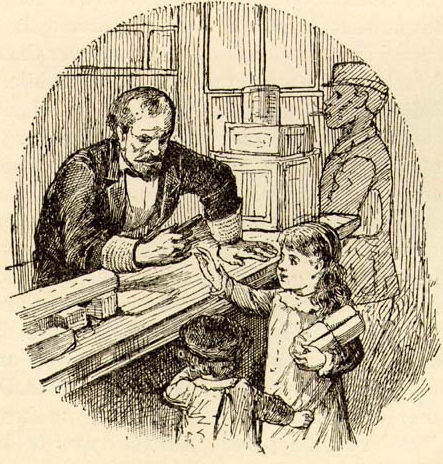
"We picked up one excellent word – a word worth travelling to New Orleans to get; a nice limber, expressive, handy word – 'Lagniappe'. They pronounce it lanny-yap... When a child or a servant buys something in a shop – or even the mayor or governor, for aught I know – he finishes the operation by saying, – 'Give me something for lagniappe.' The shopman always responds; gives the child a bit of liquorice-root; (nb...)": Mark Twain, Life on the Mississippi (1883)

A lagniappe (/ˈlænjæp/ LAN-yap, /lænˈjæp/ lan-YAP) is "a small gift given to a customer by a merchant at the time of a purchase" (such as a 13th doughnut on purchase of a dozen). It can be used more generally as meaning any extra or unexpected benefit.

The word entered English from the Louisiana French adapting a Quechua word, yapa ("something added"), that was brought into New Orleans by the Spanish Creoles.

== Etymology ==
After the Spanish conquered the Inca Empire, some Quechua words entered the Spanish language. The Spanish Empire for a time also included Louisiana, so there was a Spanish presence in New Orleans. In his book Creoles of Louisiana, George Washington Cable comments on the effects of the Spanish presence on Louisiana Creole French:

The Spanish occupation never became more than a conquest. The Spanish tongue, enforced in the courts and principal public offices, never superseded the French in the mouths of the people and left but a few words naturalized in the corrupt French of the slaves. The terrors of the calabozo, with its chains and whips and branding irons, were condensed into the French tri-syllabic calaboose; while the pleasant institution of ñapa—the petty gratuity added, by the retailer, to anything bought—grew the pleasanter, drawn out into [the] Gallicized lagniappe [emphasis added].

Lagniappe is derived from the South American Spanish phrase la yapa or ñapa (referring to a free extra item, usually a very cheap one). La is the feminine definite article in Spanish as well as in French (la ñapa or la gniappe = the ñapa/gniappe). The term has been traced back to the Quechua word yapay ('to increase; to add'). In Andean markets it is still customary to ask for a yapa (translates as "a little extra") when making a purchase. The seller usually responds by throwing in a little extra.

Although this is an old custom, it is still widely practiced in Louisiana. Street vendors, especially vegetable vendors, are expected to throw in a few green chili peppers or a small bunch of cilantro with a purchase. The word is used in the Gulf Coast region of the United States and in other places with historic links to French Creole culture, such as in Trinidad and Tobago. The concept is practiced in many more places however, such as the Spanish-speaking world, Southeast Asia, North Africa, rural France, Australia, the Netherlands, and Switzerland.

Although the word is included in English dictionaries, it is used primarily in the region influenced by New Orleans (and therefore Louisiana French) culture and so may be thought of as being more Cajun French or Louisiana Creole French than English. This is especially so since the spelling has been influenced by French.

Mark Twain writes about the word in a chapter on New Orleans in Life on the Mississippi (1883). He called lagniappe "a word worth traveling to New Orleans to get":

We picked up one excellent word—a word worth travelling to New Orleans to get; a nice limber, expressive, handy word—"lagniappe". They pronounce it lanny-yap. It is Spanish—so they said. We discovered it at the head of a column of odds and ends in the Picayune, the first day; heard twenty people use it the second; inquired what it meant the third; adopted it and got facility in swinging it the fourth. It has a restricted meaning, but I think the people spread it out a little when they choose. It is the equivalent of the thirteenth roll in a "baker's dozen". It is something thrown in, gratis, for good measure. The custom originated in the Spanish quarter of the city. When a child or a servant buys something in a shop—or even the mayor or the governor, for aught I know—he finishes the operation by saying—"Give me something for lagniappe."

The shopman always responds; gives the child a bit of licorice-root, gives the servant a cheap cigar or a spool of thread, gives the governor—I don't know what he gives the governor; support, likely.

When you are invited to drink, and this does occur now and then in New Orleans—and you say, "What, again?—no, I've had enough;" the other party says, "But just this one time more—this is for lagniappe." When the beau perceives that he is stacking his compliments a trifle too high, and sees by the young lady's countenance that the edifice would have been better with the top compliment left off, he puts his "I beg pardon—no harm intended," into the briefer form of "Oh, that's for lagniappe."

In Ireland, the term "luck penny" (or "luckpenny") denotes a lagniappe.

== See also ==
- List of English words of Quechua origin
