= Pennsylvania Dutch English =

Dialect of English

- Native to: United States, Canada
- Region: Pennsylvania; Ohio; Indiana; Ontario; and elsewhere
- Language family: Indo-European: Germanic; West Germanic; North Sea Germanic; Anglo–Frisian; Anglic; English; North American English; American English; Pennsylvania Dutch English
- Early forms: Old English: Middle English; Early Modern English
- Writing system: Latin (English alphabet)

Language codes
- ISO 639-3: –
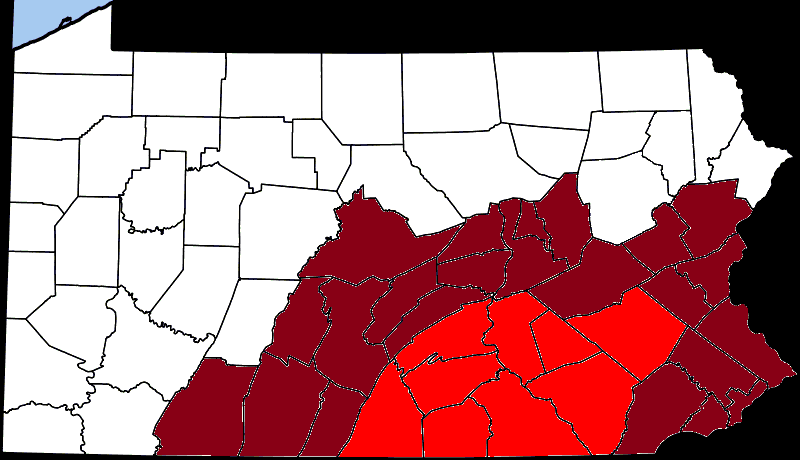
- The Pennsylvania counties of Pennsylvania Dutch Country, where Pennsylvania Dutch English has traditionally been spoken

Pennsylvania Dutch English is a dialect of English that has been influenced by the Pennsylvania Dutch language. It is largely spoken in South Central Pennsylvania, both by people who are monolingual in English and bilingual in Pennsylvania Dutch and English.

Very few non-Amish members of these people can speak the Pennsylvania German language, although most know some words and phrases. The World War II generation of the mid-20th century was the last generation in which Pennsylvania Dutch was widely spoken outside the Amish and Old Order Mennonite communities.

== Features of Pennsylvania German influence ==
Pennsylvania Dutch English differs from standard English in various ways. Some of its hallmark features include:

- Widespread devoicing of obstruents, such as "round" being pronounced "rount" or "eggs" as "ecks".
- The use of certain vowel variants in specific phonological contexts.
- The use of Pennsylvania German verb and noun stems in word construction.
- Specific intonation patterns for questions.
- Special placement of prepositional phrases in sentences (so that "Throw some hay over the fence for the horse" might be rendered "Throw the horse over the fence some hay").
- The use of "ain't" and "not" or "say" as question tags.
- The use of "still" as a habitual verbal marker.
- The use of the phrase "what for" to mean "what kind of", as in "What for drink do you have?" (German = "was für")
- Use of the word "yet" to mean "still", such as "do you work at the store yet?" to mean "do you still work at the store?"
- Use of terms such as "doncha know" and "so I do" or "so he does" at the end of declaratory sentences.
- Use of the word "awhile" at the end of sentences proposing simultaneous actions (e.g. "Go get the tea out of the pantry; I'll start boiling the water awhile."). This comes from the semantic calquing of the German word "alleweil", which means "right now" or "in a little while". English speakers in contact with Pennsylvanian Dutch speakers adopted the word but phonologically adapted it by replacing "alleweil" for the more familiar, English "awhile".
- Omitting "to be" from the passive construction in an infinitive following "needs" or "wants" (e.g. "the car needs cleaned" instead of "the car needs to be cleaned").

Other calques include:

Pennsylvania Dutch English term	Standard English term	Pennsylvania German term	Related Standard German term	Word-for-word Standard German translation
Outen the lights.	Turn off the lights.	Mach's Licht aus.	Mach das Licht aus.	"Make the light out."
The [noun(s)] is/are all. (e.g. The food is all.)	There is/are no more [noun(s)].	Die [nouns] sin all, OR Der/Die/Es [noun] is all.	Die [nouns] sind alle, OR Der/Die/Das [noun] ist alle.	"The [nouns] are all."
Don't eat yourself full.	Don't fill yourself up.	Iss dich net voll.	Iss dich nicht voll.	"Eat yourself not full."
There's cake back yet.	There is cake to come.	Es gibt datt noch Kuche.	Es gibt da noch Kuchen.	"There is still cake."
It wonders me.	It makes me wonder.	Es wunnert mich.	Das wundert mich.	"It wonders me."
Spritzing	Lightly raining	Schpritze	Spritzen	Spritzing
Rutsching	Squirming	Rutsche	Rutschen	"Slipping / Sliding"
Schusslich	Clumsy (with things, usually due to hurrying)	Schusslich	Schusselig	"Scatty / Scatterbrained"
Doplich / Doppich	Clumsy (with oneself)	Dappich	Täppisch / Tappig	"Clumsy"
Yah, well.	Whatever / It makes no difference	Ya, well.	Ja, wohl.	"Yes, well."
Wutz	Pig (when someone eats a lot)	Die Wutz	Die Wutz	"The Pig" (regional word)
Kutz / Kutzing	Vomit / Vomiting	Der Kotz / Kotze	Die Kotze / Kotzen	"Vomit"
Schtriwwelich	Uncombed or stringy	Schtriwwelich	Strubbelig	"Disheveled"
Brutzing / Grexing	Whining / Complaining	Brutze / Grexe	Jammern / Klagen	"Whining / Complaining"
Wuntz (Once)	For a second / Quickly	Eemols	Einmal	Once / One-time
Mox nix	Irrelevant	Macht's nix	(Das) Macht nichts.	"(That) Matters not."
Nix nootz / Nix nootzie	Misbehaving (usually referring to a little kid)	Nixnutz	Nichtsnutz	"No-use."
Schnickelfritz	Troublemaker (usually referring to a little kid)	Schnickelfritz	Schnacken + Fritz	"Chatting Fritz"
Right like	Exactly the same as	Genau wie / Yuscht wie	Genau wie	"Just like"

Other idioms include "Make wet?" meaning "Is it going to rain?", "hurrieder" meaning "faster", and "dippy eggs/ecks" meaning "over-easy or soft-boiled eggs".

== See also ==
- Lunenburg English, a dialect of Canadian English similarly influenced by German
- Northeast Pennsylvania English
- Philadelphia dialect
- North American English regional phonology
- Regional vocabularies of American English
