= William C. Mann =

William C. "Bill" Mann (died August 13, 2004, aged 69) was a computer scientist and computational linguist, the originator of rhetorical structure theory (RST) and a president of the Association for Computational Linguistics (1987–1988). He is especially well known for his work in text generation.

He received a Ph.D. in artificial intelligence and computer science at Carnegie Mellon University under Herbert Simon and Allen Newell.

From the mid-1970s until 1990, he was a researcher at the Information Sciences Institute of the University of Southern California. From 1990 to 1996, he was a consultant with the Summer Institute of Linguistics, based in Nairobi.

William C. Mann died on August 13, 2004, after a long struggle with leukemia.

== Publications ==
- William C. Mann and Sandra A. Thompson, "Rhetorical structure theory: toward a functional theory of text organization", Text 8:243-281 (1988).
- Maite Taboada, William C. Mann, "Applications of Rhetorical Structure Theory", Discourse Studies 8:3:567-588 (2006)

== Bibliography ==
- Christian M.I.M. Matthiessen, "Remembering Bill Mann", Computational Linguistics 31:2:161-171
