= Text & Talk =

- Discipline: Discourse analysis
- Language: English
- Edited by: Srikant Sarangi

Publication details
- Former name: Text
- History: 1981–present
- Publisher: Mouton de Gruyter (Germany)
- Frequency: Bimonthly

Standard abbreviations
- ISO 4: Text Talk

Indexing
- ISSN: 1860-7330 (print); 1860-7349 (web)
- OCLC no.: 909625527

Links
- Journal homepage

Text & Talk: An Interdisciplinary Journal of Language, Discourse & Communication Studies is an academic journal published by Mouton de Gruyter. From 1981 through 1995, the journal was published under the name Text (ISSN 0165-4888).
