= New York English (disambiguation) =

New York English describes the varieties of English spoken within New York (state), the most well-known of which is perhaps New York City English.

New York English, the New York dialect or the New York accent may refer to:

- New York City English, a regional dialect spoken by many people in New York City and much of its surrounding metropolitan area
- Inland Northern American English, a dialect spanning much of Western and Central New York, as well as many areas outside of New York State
- Other varieties spoken within regions of New York such as the Leatherstocking Region, the Capital District, the North Country and Long Island

The terms above may also refer to New York Latino English, a Hispanic American ethnolect originating in New York City, also referred to as East Coast Latino English and sometimes colloquially referred to as a Bronx accent.

== See also ==
- New York (disambiguation)
- List of dialects of the English language, a list of varieties that differ in pronunciation, vocabulary and grammar
