= New York population =

New York population may refer to:

- Demographics of New York (state)
- Demographics of New York City
