= Demographics of New York =

Demographics of New York may refer to:

- Demographics of New York City
- Demographics of New York (state)
