= Skell (disambiguation) =

Skell is American slang for a homeless person or a vagrant.

Skell may also refer to:

- Philip Skell, American chemist
- River Skell, England
- SKELL, a language learning tool
- Skell (mythology), a Native American god

== See also ==
- Skel (disambiguation)
