= Demographics of New York (state) =

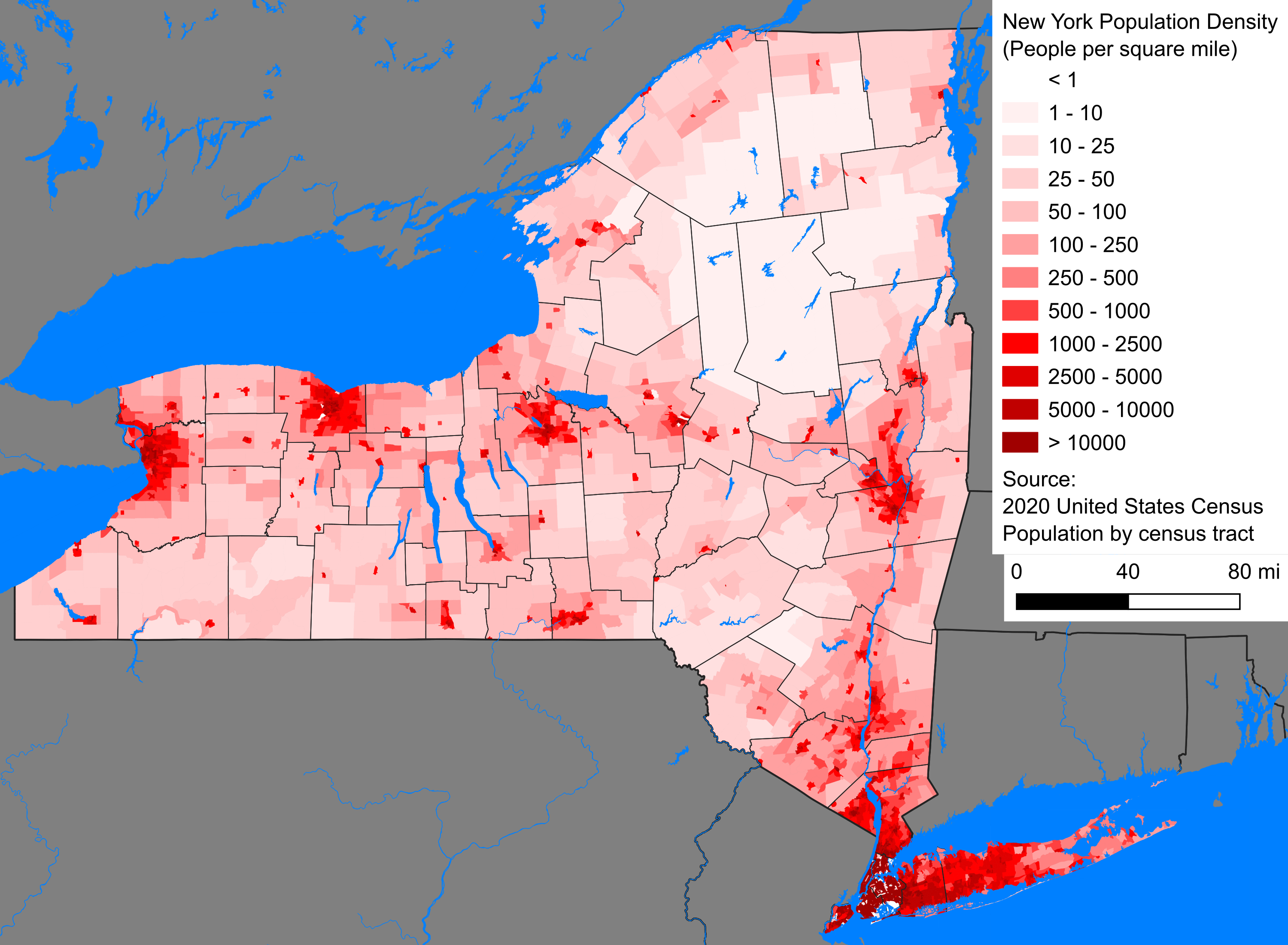
New York population distribution

Historical population
Census	Pop.	Note	%±
1790	340,120		—
1800	589,051		73.2%
1810	959,049		62.8%
1820	1,372,851		43.1%
1830	1,918,608		39.8%
1840	2,428,921		26.6%
1850	3,097,394		27.5%
1860	3,880,735		25.3%
1870	4,382,759		12.9%
1880	5,082,871		16.0%
1890	5,997,853		18.0%
1900	7,268,894		21.2%
1910	9,113,614		25.4%
1920	10,385,227		14.0%
1930	12,588,066		21.2%
1940	13,479,142		7.1%
1950	14,830,192		10.0%
1960	16,782,304		13.2%
1970	18,236,967		8.7%
1980	17,558,072		−3.7%
1990	17,990,455		2.5%
2000	18,976,457		5.5%
2010	19,378,102		2.1%
2020	20,201,249		4.2%
2025 (est.)	20,002,427		−1.0%
Sources: 1910–2020; 2025.

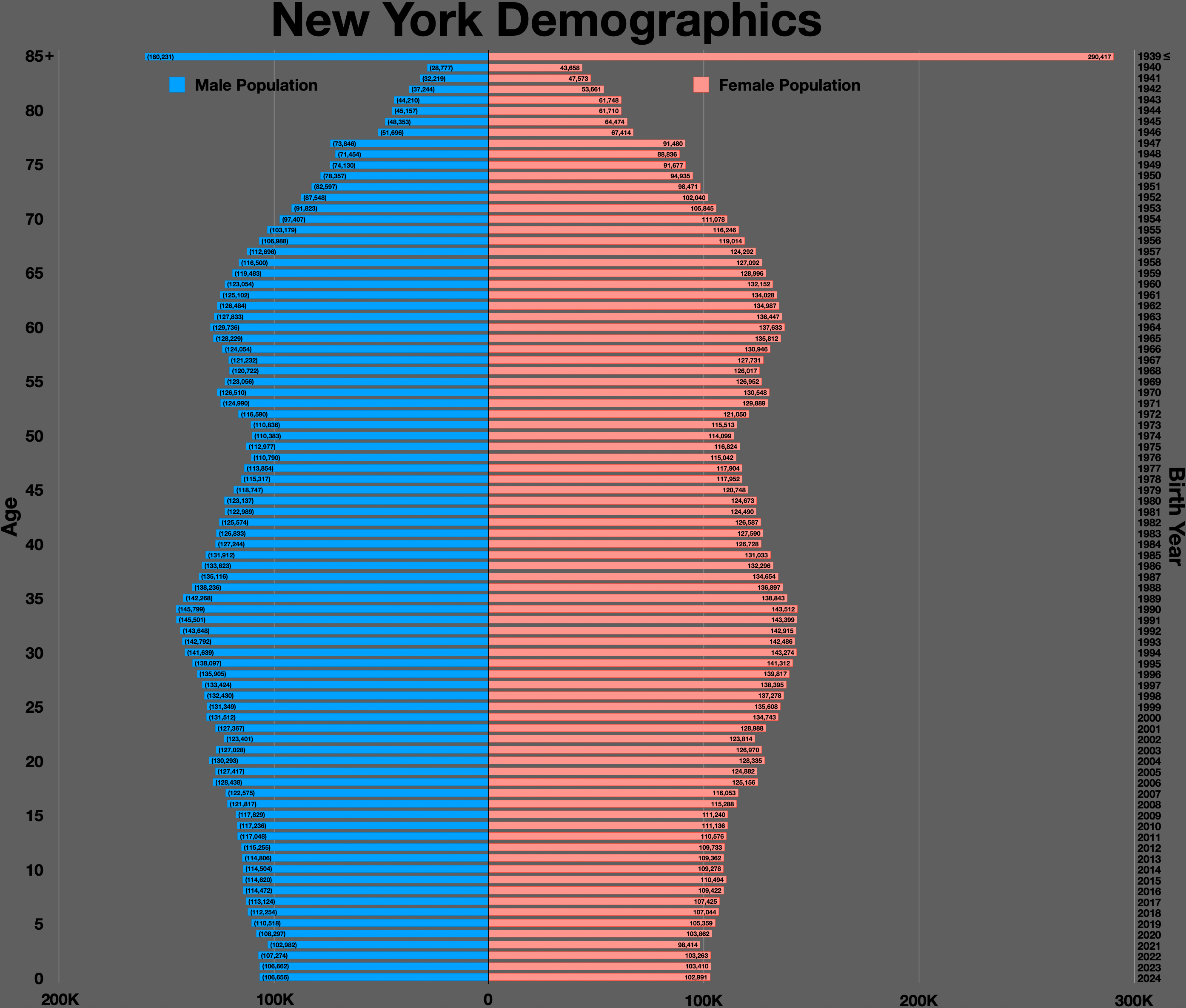
New York population pyramid

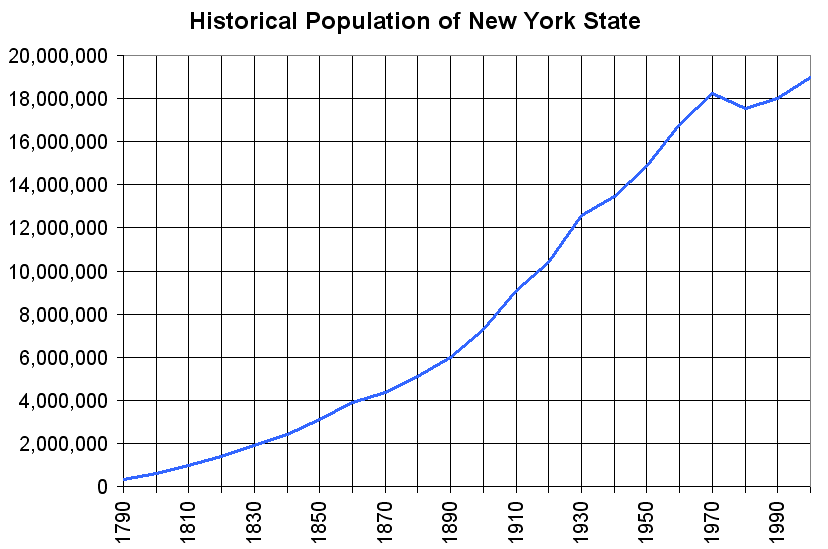
Historical population of NY

According to the U.S. Census Bureau, as of 2023, New York was the fourth largest state in population after California, Texas, and Florida, with a population of 19,571,216, a decrease of over 600,000 people, or −3.1%, since the 2020 census. The population change between 2000–2006 includes a natural increase of 601,779 people (1,576,125 births minus 974,346 deaths) and a decrease due to net migration of 422,481 people out of the state. Immigration from outside the United States resulted in a net increase of 820,388 people, and migration within the country produced a net loss of about 800,213.

The distribution of change in population growth is uneven in the State of New York; the New York City metropolitan area is growing considerably, along with Saratoga County, and Western New York. The rest of the state is nearly stagnant. According to immigration statistics, the state is a leading recipient of migrants from around the globe. In 2005, immigration failed to surpass emigration which reversed since 2006. The State of New York lost two house seats in the 2011 congressional reapportionment, secondary to relatively slow growth when compared to the rest of the United States.

The center of population of New York is located in Orange County, in the town of Deerpark. Roughly 64% of the state's population lives in the New York City metropolitan area and 40% in New York City alone.

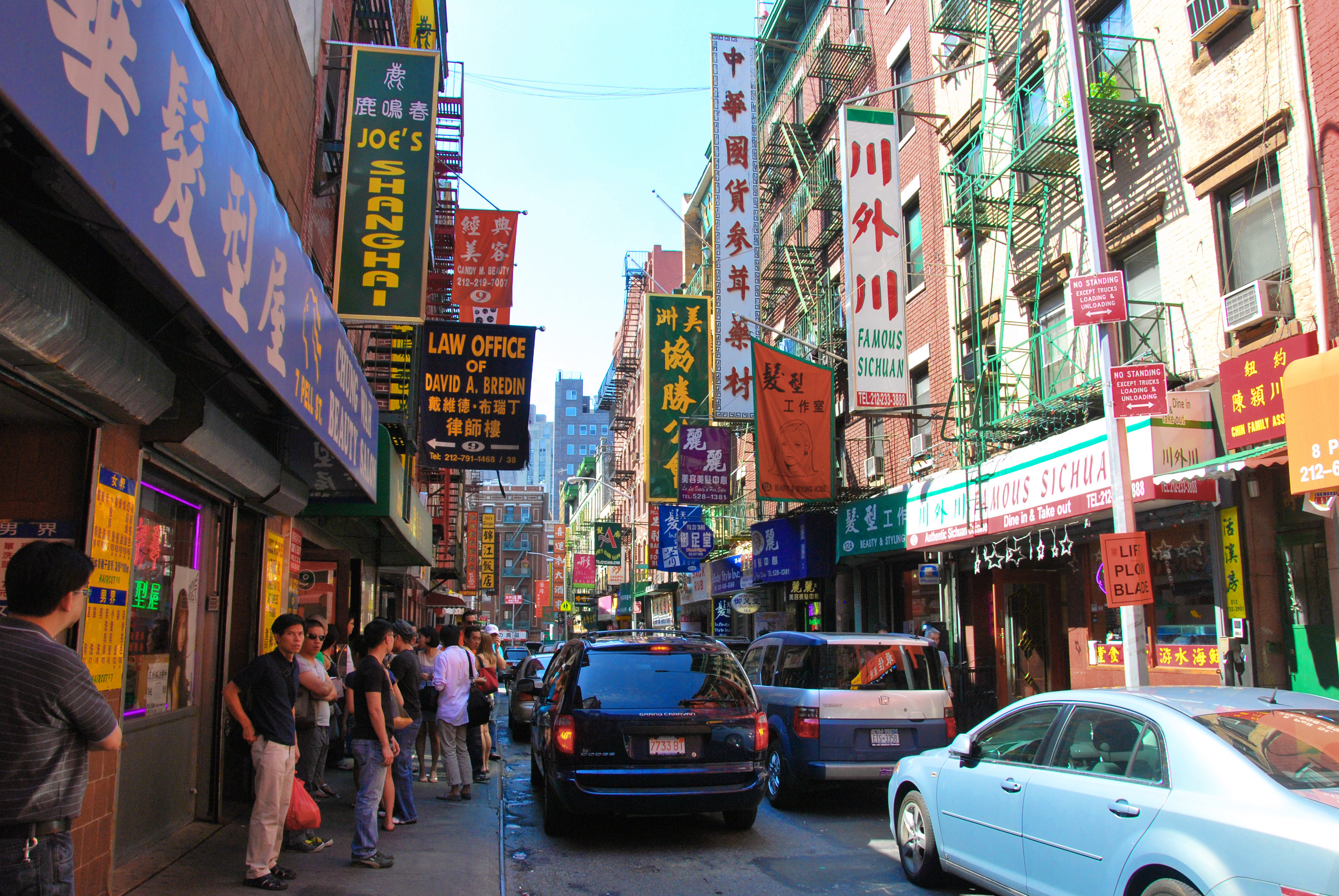
The Manhattan Chinatown (紐約華埠). Chinese people constitute the fastest-growing demographic nationality in New York State.

== Population ==
The State of New York has a primarily urban population. The largest city in the state is New York City, which is also one of the world's most ethnically diverse and cosmopolitan cities. Additional major urban centers include Albany, Buffalo, Rochester, Syracuse and Utica. The state has 62 counties; the most populated one is Kings County (Brooklyn). Much of New York State's population outside of New York City is concentrated in the Long Island, Hudson Valley, Western New York, Finger Lakes, and Capital District regions; if the population of New York City is included, this amounts to 90% of the state's total population.

The intense development, urbanization and suburban sprawl of New York City makes it the most populated region in New York and the collective U.S., an estimated 20 to 30 million in the eight-state Megalopolis stretching 500 miles from Boston to Washington, D.C., with New York City in the middle has 15 million residents in a 100-mile radius including Philadelphia (1.5 million in its city limits), northern New Jersey and Connecticut. A simple majority of New York's population lives within two hours of New York City. According to the 2020 Census, New York City and its six closest New York State satellite counties (Suffolk, Nassau, Westchester, Rockland, Putnam and Orange) have a combined population of 13,567,648 people, or 67.16% of the state's population.

Year	Population	White	% W	Black	% B
1703	20,665	N/A	89.1	N/A	10.9
1723	40,564	N/A	84.8	N/A	15.2
1731	50,242	N/A	85.7	N/A	13.3
1746	61,589	N/A	85.2	N/A	14.8
1756	96,584	N/A	86.2	N/A	13.8
1771	168,007	N/A	88.2	N/A	11.8

=== Age ===
In age demographics: 6.5% of New York's population were under 5 years of age, 24.7% under 18, and 12.9% were 65 or older. The percentage of population that is female is 51.8%. New York state has a fluctuating population growth rate, it has experienced some shrinkage in the 1970s and 1980s, but milder growth in the 1990s and the first decade of the 21st century.

=== Language ===
According to the 2000 U.S. census, 13.61% of the population aged 5 and older speak Spanish at home, while 2.04% speak Chinese (including Cantonese and Mandarin), 1.65% Italian, and 1.23% Russian.

=== 2020 Census ===
The State of New York in the 2020 Census had a population of 20,201,249 and the racial makeup was 52.5% Non-Hispanic White, 19.5% Hispanic or Latino, 14.8% Black, 9.6% Asian, 0.7% Native American, and 0.1% Pacific Islander.

New York ethnic distribution, 2000

According to 2004 estimates, 20.4% of the population was foreign-born. Among cities in the State of New York, 36% of New York City's population is foreign-born; this figure of approximately 3 million is a higher total number of foreign-born residents than any other U.S. city. This number is often around 20% in other cities across New York.

The term American Jew is used to describe ethnic Jews by some demographers, and religious identity (religious Jews, see: Judaism) of various nationalities and various denominations by others. Regardless, collectively most are American-born and are a major social presence in New York. An estimated 1 to 2 million alone in New York City and another 1 to 1.5 million live in surrounding areas, sometimes New York is referred to as the "world's largest Jewish city" since the mid-19th century. The first wave of Jewish immigrants in New York are of Sephardic origin, a scant 10,000 from the Netherlands, Italy, Spain and Portugal in the 17th and 18th centuries, but in the 19th century more newcomers were first German and finally in the early 20th century millions from Eastern Europe like Poland and Russia, both of Ashkenazi origin. In the late 20th century, a smaller wave of Russian Jews and Ukrainian Jews settled in the Brighton Beach section in Brooklyn.

Most Hispanic and Latino New Yorkers come from Puerto Rican, Dominican, Mexican, Ecuadorian, Salvadoran, Colombian, Guatemalan, Honduran, Peruvian, Cuban, backgrounds. New York contains the largest Puerto Rican population in the contiguous United States, concentrated in parts of New York City such as the Bronx and Manhattan. New York also has the largest Dominican population in the country, concentrated in New York City's Upper Manhattan and the Bronx. New York City is home to many with roots in Caribbean island countries like Jamaica, Barbados, Guyana, Trinidad and Tobago, Haiti and Grenada, as well as recent immigrants from sub-Saharan African countries (mainly Nigeria and Ghana).

Most Asian New Yorkers have Chinese, Indian, Korean, Filipino, Bangladeshi, Pakistani, Japanese, or Vietnamese ancestry. At 520,000 of the State of New York's over 600,000 Chinese Americans, New York City has a higher total number than Los Angeles County. New York also has the highest and growing proportion of Pakistani Americans and Bangladeshi Americans in the country, and a very high Indian American community, mainly concentrated in New York City.

=== Racial and ethnic composition ===
New York – Racial and ethnic composition Note: the US Census treats Hispanic/Latino as an ethnic category. This table excludes Latinos from the racial categories and assigns them to a separate category. Hispanics/Latinos may be of any race.
Race / Ethnicity (NH = Non-Hispanic)	Pop 1980	Pop 1990	Pop 2000	Pop 2010	Pop 2020	% 1980	% 1990	% 2000	% 2010	% 2020
White alone (NH)	13,164,733	12,460,189	4,337,143	11,304,247	10,598,907	74.98%	69.26%	88.16%	58.34%	52.47%
Black or African American alone (NH)	2,299,127	2,569,126	168,813	2,783,857	2,759,022	13.09%	14.28%	3.43%	14.37%	13.66%
Native American or Alaska Native alone (NH)	39,582	50,540	52,009	53,908	54,908	0.23%	0.28%	1.06%	0.28%	0.27%
Asian alone (NH)	310,526	666,843	141,083	1,406,194	1,916,329	1.77%	3.71%	2.87%	7.26%	9.49%
Native Hawaiian or Pacific Islander alone (NH)	x	x	1,714	5,320	6,097	x	x	0.03%	0.03%	0.03%
Other race alone (NH)	84,804	29,731	5,031	81,620	197,107	0.48%	0.17%	0.10%	0.42%	0.98%
Mixed race or Multiracial (NH)	x	x	70,304	326,034	720,847	x	x	1.43%	1.68%	3.57%
Hispanic or Latino (any race)	1,659,300	2,214,026	143,382	3,416,922	3,948,032	9.45%	12.31%	2.91%	17.63%	19.54%
Total	17,558,072	17,990,455	4,919,479	19,378,102	20,201,249	100.00%	100.00%	100.00%	100.00%	100.00%

==== 2025 American Community Survey one-year estimates ====
Racial Makeup of New York (2025): 1. White alone (53.1%); 2. Black alone (14.0%); 3. Native American alone (0.66%); 4. Asian Alone (10.4%); 5. Pacific Islander Alone (0.04%); 6. Other race alone (11.2%); 7. Two or more races (10.6%)	Racial/Ethnic Makeup of New York excluding Hispanics from racial categories (2025); NH=Non-Hispanic: 1. White NH (50.3%); 2. Black NH (13.0%); 3. Native American NH (0.27%); 4. Asian NH (10.3%); 5. Pacific Islander NH (0.02%); 6. Other race NH (1.00%); 7. Two or more races NH (4.10%); 8. Hispanic Any Race (21.0%)	Racial Makeup of Hispanics in New York (2025): 1. White alone (13.2%); 2. Black alone (4.49%); 3. Native American alone (1.86%); 4. Asian Alone (0.66%); 5. Pacific Islander Alone (0.05%); 6. Other race alone (48.8%); 7. Two or more races (30.9%)

=== 2010 census ===
As of the 2010 census, the State of New York has a population of 19,378,102. Broken down via US Census Racial classifications, this includes 12,740,974 (65.7%) white, 3,073,800 (15.9%) black, 1,420,244 (7.3%) Asian, 8,766 (0.0%) Pacific Islander, and 1,441,563 (7.4%) of other races. 585,849 (3.0%) have two or more races. Hispanics and Latinos of all "races" make up 3,416,922 (17.6%) of the state's population; non-Hispanic whites make up 58.3% of the state's population.

The Bronx has a large population of blacks that are of Latin American origin, but so does northern Manhattan (Harlem) and Brooklyn, which have had American-born black majorities since the 1920s, as well the largest African American population of any state. New York City has 1 million of New York State's 1.4 million Asian Americans. Cities such as Buffalo and Rochester are predominantly made of African Americans and various European and near-European ethnic groups. Southeast Asians, Eastern European and North/Central Asian, African and Caribbeans also have a noticeable presence.

Among the State of New York's cities, as of 2010 according to the US Racial System, New York City is 44% white (33% non-Hispanic white), 28% Latino, 25% African American, and 13% percent Asian American. The city of Buffalo, New York's second-largest city, is 50% white (45% non-Hispanic white), 38% African American, 10% Latino, and 3% Asian American. The state capital of Albany is 57% white (64% non-Hispanic white), 30% African American, 8% Latino, and 5% Asian American.

Map of municipalities in New York by racial plurality or majority. Legend: | Non-Hispanic White 30-40% 40–50% 50–60% 60–70% 70–80% 80–90% 90-100% | Hispanic or Latino 20–30% 30–40% 40–50% 50–60% | Black or African American 60-70% | Native American 40-50% 50-60% 60-70% 70-80% 80-90% 90-100% |

== Vital statistics ==
Source: Centers for Disease Control and Prevention (CDC)

Year	Population	Live births	Deaths	Natural change	Crude birth rate (per 1,000)	Crude death rate (per 1,000)	Natural change (per 1,000)	Crude migration change (per 1,000)
1999	18,196,601	255,612	159,927	95,685	14.0	8.8	5.2	39.08
2000	19,001,780	258,737	158,203	100,534	13.6	8.3	5.3	0.98
2001	19,082,838	254,026	159,240	94,786	13.3	8.3	5.0	–4.1
2002	19,137,800	251,415	158,118	93,297	13.1	8.3	4.8	–5.4
2003	19,175,939	253,714	155,877	97,837	13.2	8.1	5.1	–6.2
2004	19,171,567	249,947	152,681	97,266	13.0	8.0	5.0	–8.2
2005	19,132,610	246,351	152,427	93,924	12.9	8.0	4.9	–10.0
2006	19,104,631	250,014	148,806	101,208	13.1	7.8	5.3	–9.2
2007	19,132,335	253,451	147,680	105,771	13.2	7.7	5.5	–6.3
2008	19,212,436	250,383	148,698	101,685	13.0	7.7	5.3	–3.6
2009	19,307,066	248,110	146,475	101,635	12.9	7.6	5.3	–2.7
2010	19,420,354	244,375	146,432	97,943	12.6	7.5	5.1	–1.7
2011	19,602,134	241,312	149,174	92,138	12.3	7.6	4.7	1.7
2012	19,758,616	240,916	148,991	91,925	12.2	7.5	4.7	0.4
2013	19,892,558	236,980	150,919	86,061	11.9	7.6	4.3	–0.9
2014	20,001,317	238,773	149,944	88,829	11.9	7.5	4.4	–2.1
2015	20,087,023	237,274	153,628	83,646	11.8	7.6	4.2	–3.4
2016	20,148,134	234,283	154,358	79,925	11.6	7.7	3.9	–4.6
2017	20,187,407	229,737	155,358	74,379	11.4	7.7	3.7	–5.8
2018	20,219,472	226,238	157,183	69,055	11.2	7.8	3.4	–6.2
2019	20,220,321	221,539	156,375	65,164	11.0	7.7	3.3	–7.7
2020	20,122,262	209,338	203,341	5,997	10.4	10.1	0.3	–14.9
2021	19,835,345	210,742	181,360	29,382	10.6	9.1	1.5	–23.3
2022	19,713,025	207,774	173,944	33,830	10.5	8.8	1.7	–14.9
2023	19,786,543	203,612	162,173	41,439	10.3	8.2	2.1	–4.5
2024	20,001,419	205,489	159,614	45,875	10.3	8.0	2.3	2.8
2025	20,002,427	202,155	160,400	41,755	10.1	8.0	2.1	–8.0

Note: Births in table don't add up, because Hispanics are counted both by their ethnicity and by their race, giving a higher overall number.

Live Births by Single Race/Ethnicity of Mother
Race	2014	2015	2016	2017	2018	2019	2020	2021	2022	2023	2024
White	116,013 (48.6%)	114,643 (48.3%)	111,382 (47.5%)	111,690 (48.6%)	110,840 (49.0%)	109,281 (49.3%)	104,581 (50.0%)	106,679 (50.6%)	104,103 (50.1%)	101,336 (49.8%)	101,902 (49.6%)
Black	46,744 (19.6%)	46,109 (19.4%)	34,166 (14.6%)	34,062 (14.8%)	33,145 (14.7%)	32,057 (14.5%)	30,057 (14.3%)	28,946 (13.7%)	27,935 (13.4%)	26,192 (12.9%)	25,564 (12.4%)
Asian	26,786 (11.2%)	26,556 (11.2%)	26,730 (11.4%)	25,429 (11.1%)	24,383 (10.8%)	24,217 (10.9%)	21,074 (10.1%)	20,463 (9.7%)	20,652 (9.9%)	20,000 (9.8%)	20,759 (10.1%)
American Indian	757 (0.3%)	738 (0.3%)	375 (0.2%)	382 (0.2%)	445 (0.2%)	440 (0.2%)	360 (0.2%)	330 (0.1%)	327 (0.1%)	325 (0.1%)	316 (0.1%)
Hispanic (any race)	55,329 (23.2%)	55,796 (23.5%)	54,222 (23.1%)	53,112 (23.1%)	51,755 (22.9%)	50,323 (22.7%)	47,904 (22.9%)	48,984 (23.2%)	50,131 (24.1%)	50,832 (24.9%)	51,898 (25.2%)
Total	238,773 (100%)	237,274 (100%)	234,283 (100%)	229,737 (100%)	226,238 (100%)	221,539 (100%)	209,338 (100%)	210,742 (100%)	207,774 (100%)	203,612 (100%)	205,489 (100%)

- Since 2016, data for births of White Hispanic origin are not collected, but included in one Hispanic group; persons of Hispanic origin may be of any race.

=== Percentage surviving ===
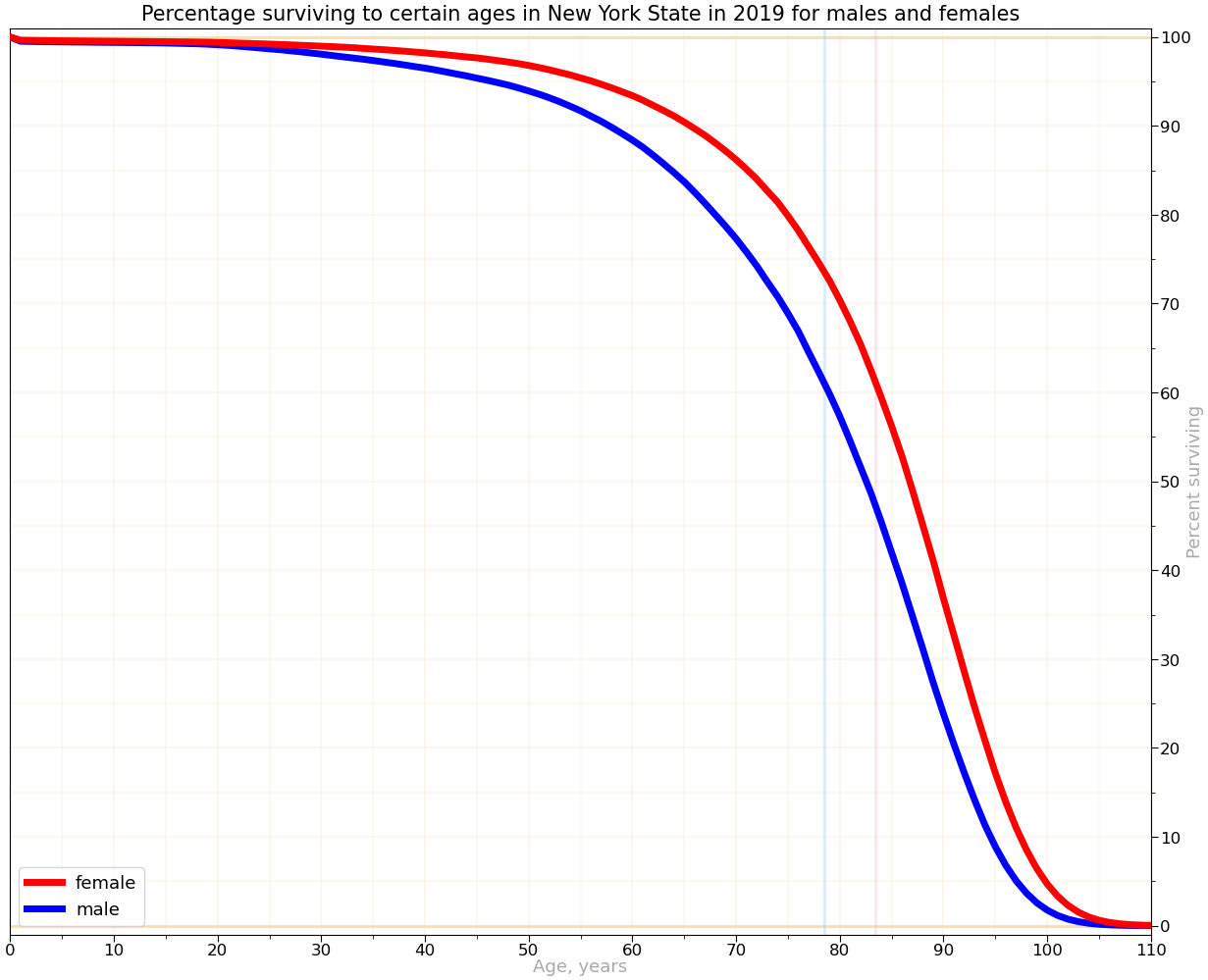
Percentage surviving to certain ages in New York State in 2019. Life expectancy in this state is one of the highest in the US: before COVID-19 it was 81.06 years.

The percentage surviving, is the percent of the population that would survive to certain age, if their life conditions in a given year, were extrapolated to their whole life. Data for 2019.

Age	Percentage surviving		F / M
Age	male	female	F / M
1	99.5	99.6	1.00
5	99.4	99.6	1.00
10	99.4	99.5	1.00
15	99.3	99.5	1.00
20	99.1	99.4	1.00
25	98.7	99.2	1.01
30	98.1	99.0	1.01
35	97.4	98.6	1.01
40	96.5	98.2	1.02
45	95.4	97.7	1.02
50	93.9	96.8	1.03
55	91.7	95.4	1.04
60	88.4	93.4	1.06
65	83.7	90.4	1.08
70	77.3	86.2	1.11
75	68.9	79.9	1.16
80	57.3	70.4	1.23
85	42.0	56.2	1.34
90	23.8	36.8	1.54
95	8.9	17.2	1.93
100	1.750	4.694	2.68
105	0.153	0.608	3.97
110	0.006	0.033	5.50

Data source: US Mortality DataBase.

== Immigration ==
Country of birth	Population (2013)	% of all immigrants
Total foreign-born	4,314,700	100
Dominican Republic	443,500	10.3
China	384,800	8.9
Jamaica	252,200	5.4
Mexico	242,500	5.6
Ecuador	174,000	4.0
Guyana	156,700	3.6
India	148,900	3.5
Haiti	130,500	3.0
El Salvador	109,200	2.5
Italy	104,800	2.4
Trinidad and Tobago	103,100	2.4
South Korea	102,500	2.4
Colombia	100,800	2.3
Philippines	86,900	2.0
Russia	85,800	2.0

== Languages ==
The most common American English accents spoken, besides General American English, were the New York City area dialect (including New York City Latino English and North Jersey English), the Western New England accent around Albany and Plattsburgh, Canadian English in the North Country and Inland Northern American English from Buffalo across much of the remaining Upstate New York area.

As of 2015, 70.72% (12,788,233) of New York residents age 5 and older spoke English at home as a primary language, while 14.44% (2,611,903) spoke Spanish, 2.61% (472,955) Chinese (which includes Cantonese and Mandarin), 1.20% (216,468) Russian, 1.18% (213,785) Italian, 0.79% (142,169) French Creole, 0.75% (135,789) French, 0.67% (121,917) Yiddish, 0.63% (114,574) Korean and 0.53% (95,413) Polish. In total, 29.28% (5,295,016) of New York's population aged 5 and older spoke a mother language other than English.

Top 10 non-English languages spoken in New York
Language	Percentage of population (as of 2010)
Spanish	14.44%
Chinese (including Cantonese and Mandarin)	2.61%
Russian	1.20%
Italian	1.18%
French Creole	0.79%
French	0.75%
Yiddish	0.67%
Korean	0.63%
Polish	0.53%
Bengali	0.43%

== Religion ==
Religion in New York (2023)
1. Roman Catholicism 33 (31.7%)
2. Protestantism 27 (26.0%)
3. Mormonism 1 (0.96%)
4. Eastern Orthodoxy 1 (0.96%)
5. Jehovah's Witnesses 1 (0.96%)
6. Other Christian 1 (0.96%)
7. No religion 27 (26.0%)
8. Judaism 7 (6.73%)
9. Islam 1.6 (1.54%)
10. Buddhism 1 (0.96%)
11. Hinduism 1.4 (1.35%)
12. Other religion 1 (0.96%)
13. No response given/Unknown 1 (0.96%)

A 2023 survey found that the religious affiliations of the people of New York were:

- Christian – (combined 60%)
  - Catholic – 33%
  - Various Protestant denominations – 27%
  - Other Christian denominations – 3%
- Non-Religious – 27%
- Jewish – 7%
- Muslim – 1.6%
- Buddhist – 1%
- Hindu – 1.4%
- Other Religions – 1%

== Ancestries ==
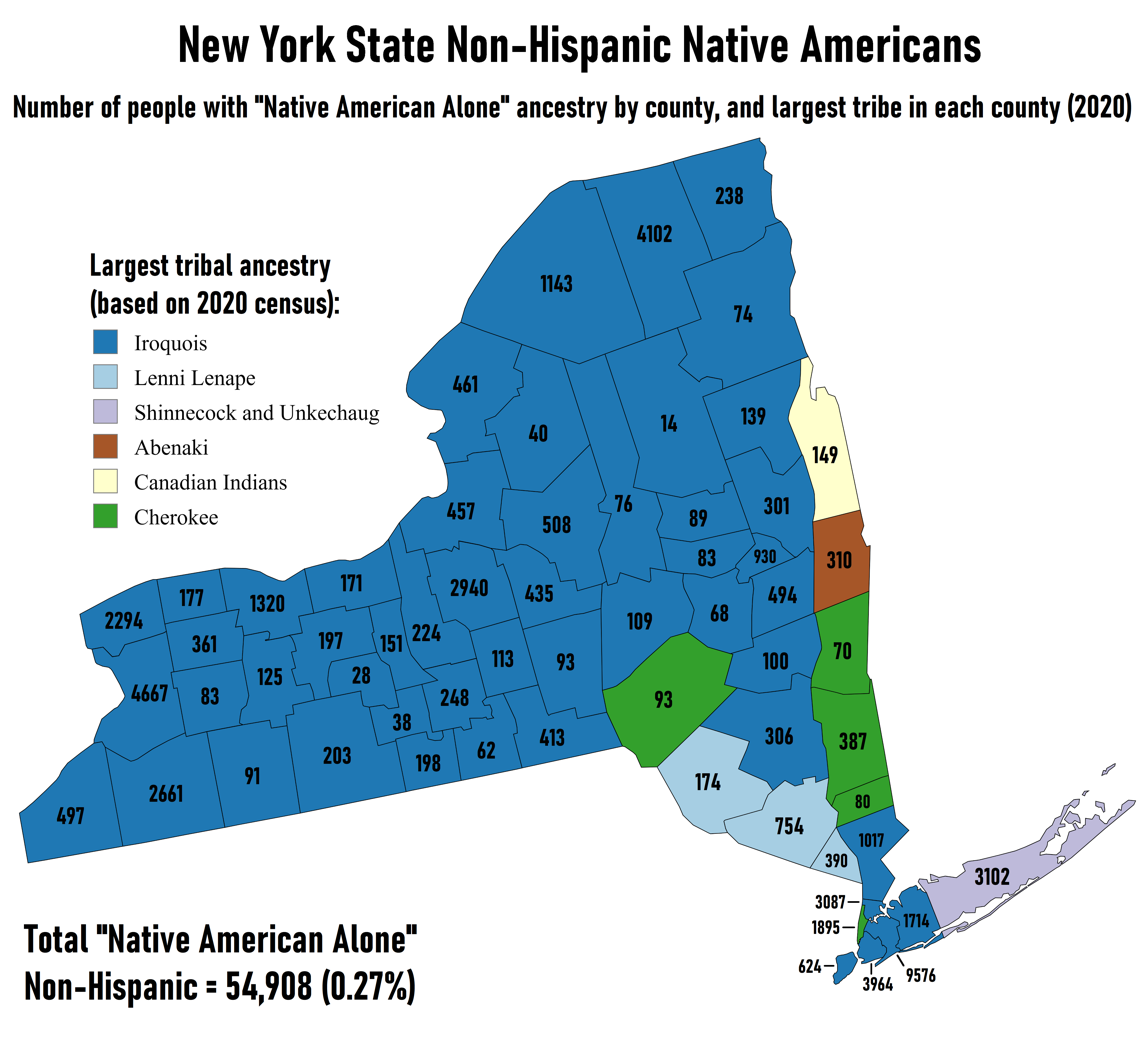
Largest Non-Hispanic Native American ancestry by county and numbers of people reporting "Native American Alone"

=== Ancestries ===
Ancestry	Number in 2023 (Alone)	Number in 2023 (Alone or in any combination)	%
Italian	911,222	2,116,020	10.8%
Irish	562,974	2,041,148	10.4%
German	369,790	2,017,483	10.2%
English	288,134	1,057,598	5.4%
Puerto Rican	—	954,801	4.9%
Dominican	—	848,560	4.3%
American	609,014	821,027	4.2%
Chinese (Not including Taiwanese)	707,857	775,028	4.0%
Polish	265,621	740,795	3.8%
Mexican	—	517,130	2.6%
Indian	365,568	416,407	2.1%
French (Not including French Canadian)	65,986	313,257	1.6%
Ecuadorian	—	306,683	1.6%
Jamaican	249,754	305,916	1.6%
Russian	116,602	278,704	1.4%
Salvadoran	—	213,062	1.1%
Arab	139,035	204,039	1.0%
Haitian	161,178	196,698	1.0%
Colombian	—	191,560	1.0%
Scottish	39,595	183,865	0.9%
Ukrainian	90,412	165,613	0.8%
Filipino	115,047	160,000	0.8%
Korean	125,956	154,137	0.8%
Dutch	31,698	153,769	0.8%
Guyanese	121,442	148,448	0.8%
Hungarian	81,428	146,391	0.7%
Greek	75,584	142,601	0.7%
Bangladeshi	126,775	130,668	0.7%
Guatemalan	—	130,304	0.7%
Spanish (Including responses of "Spaniard," "Spanish," and "Spanish American.")	—	105,473	0.5%
Pakistani	87,521	94,888	0.5%
Swedish	20,386	90,313	0.5%
Cuban	—	88,904	0.5%
Honduran	—	88,463	0.5%
French Canadian	34,545	87,242	0.4%
Peruvian	—	87,052	0.4%
Trinidadian and Tobagonian	63,909	84,645	0.4%
Norwegian	18,704	74,197	0.4%
Welsh	10,528	63,828	0.3%
Scotch-Irish	15,905	61,972	0.3%
Japanese	31,908	57,219	0.3%
Albanian	50,293	56,650	0.3%
Portuguese	24,203	55,861	0.3%
Austrian	10,150	55,133	0.3%
British West Indian	40,447	54,623	0.3%
Nigerian	39,811	51,152	0.3%

There is a Roma community in New York.

== See also ==
- Demographics of New York City
- Hispanics and Latinos in New York
