= Skel =

Skel may refer to:

- Steffen Skel (born 1972), German luger
- Skel Roach (1871–1958), American baseball player and coach
- "Skel", a 2023 song by Sigur Rós from Átta

== See also ==
- Skell (disambiguation)
