= New York City English =

Variety of American English

- Region: New York metropolitan area
- Ethnicity: Various (see Demographics of New York City)
- Language family: Indo-European: Germanic; West Germanic; Ingvaeonic; Anglo-Frisian; English; North American English; American English; New York City English
- Early forms: Old English: Middle English; Early Modern English
- Writing system: Latin (English alphabet); American Braille

Language codes
- ISO 639-3: –
- Glottolog: newy1234
- Linguasphere: 52-ABA-cfb
- IETF: en-u-sd-usny

New York City English, or Metropolitan New York English, is a regional dialect of American English spoken primarily in New York City and some of its surrounding metropolitan area. Along with Southern American English, it has been described by sociolinguist William Labov as one of the most widely recognized regional dialects in the United States. Its pronunciation system—the New York accent—is widely represented in American media by many public figures and fictional characters. Major features of the accent include a high, gliding /ɔ/ vowel (in words like talk and caught); a split of the "short a" vowel /æ/ into two separate sounds; variable dropping of r sounds; and a lack of the cot–caught, Mary–marry–merry, and hurry–furry mergers heard in many other American accents.

Today, New York City English is associated particularly with urban New Yorkers of lower and middle socioeconomic status who are descended from 19th- and 20th-century European immigrants. The dialect is spoken in all five boroughs of the City and throughout Long Island's Nassau County; it is also heard to varying degrees in Suffolk County (Long Island), Westchester County, and Rockland County of New York State plus Hudson County, Bergen County, and the city of Newark (Essex County) in northeastern New Jersey.

== History ==
The origins of many of New York City English's diverse features are probably not recoverable. New York City English, largely with the same major pronunciation system popularly recognized today, was first reproduced in literature and scientifically documented in the 1890s. It was then, and still mostly is, associated with ethnically diverse European-American native-English speakers. The entire Mid-Atlantic United States, including both New York City and the Philadelphia metropolitan area (whose own distinct dialect centers around Philadelphia and Baltimore) shares certain key features, including a high /ɔ/ vowel with a glide (the "aw" sound in law or cause) as well as a phonemic split of the short a vowel, /æ/ (making gas and gap, for example, have different vowels sounds)—New York City's split not identical though to Philadelphia's. Linguist William Labov has pointed out that a similarly structured (though differently pronounced) split is found today in the southern accents of England, including London; thus, a single common origin of this split may trace back to colonial-era England. (Note: Labov, Ash & Boberg (2006), p. 173: "In NYC and the Mid-Atlantic region, short-a is split into a tense and lax class. There is reason to believe that the tense class /æh/ descends from the British /ah/ or 'broad-a' class.")

New York City became an urban economic power in the eighteenth century, with the city's financial elites maintaining close ties with the British Empire even after the Revolutionary War. According to Labov, New York City speakers' loss of the r sound after vowels (incidentally, not found in the nearby Delaware Valley) began as a nineteenth-century imitation of this prestigious British feature, consistently starting among the upper classes in New York City before spreading to other socioeconomic classes. After World War II, social perceptions reversed and r-preserving (rhotic) pronunciations became the new American prestige standard, rejecting traditional East Coast and British accent features, while postwar migrations transferred rhotic speakers directly to New York City from many other regions of the country. The result is that non-rhoticity, which was once a high-status feature and later a city-wide feature, has been diminishing and now, since the mid-twentieth century onward, largely remains only among lower-class New Yorkers. Today, New York City metropolitan accents are often rhotic or variably rhotic.

Other features of the dialect, such as the dental pronunciations of d and t, and related th-stopping, likely come from contact with foreign languages, particularly Italian and Yiddish, brought into New York City through its huge immigration waves of Europeans during the mid-to-late nineteenth century and early twentieth century. Grammatical structures, such as the lack of inversion in indirect questions, similarly suggest contact with immigrant languages, plus several words common in the city are derived from such foreign languages.

=== Influence on other dialects ===
Philadelphians born in the early and mid-twentieth century exhibit a short-a split system that some linguists regard as a simplification of the very similar New York City short-a split. Younger Philadelphians, however, are retreating from many of the traditional features shared in common with New York City. Due to an influx of immigrants from New York City and neighboring New Jersey to southern Florida, some resident southern Floridians now speak with an accent reminiscent of a New York accent. Additionally, the traditional accent of New Orleans, known locally as "Yat", bears distinctive similarities with the New York accent, as a result of social and commercial contact between the two cities in the later nineteenth century. Shared features include the (moribund) coil–curl merger, raising of the /ɔ/ vowel to [ɔə], a similar split in the short-a system, and th-stopping. Similarly, dialectal similarities suggest that older New York City English also influenced Cincinnati, Ohio, and the Hudson Valley reaching north to Albany, New York, whose older speakers in particular may still exhibit a short-a split system that linguists suggest is an expanded or generalized variant of the New York City short-a system. Certain New York City dialect features also appear in New York Latino English.

=== Recent developments ===
Though William Labov argued in 2010 that the New York City accent is basically stable at the moment, some recent studies have revealed a trend of recession in most features of the accent, especially among younger speakers from middle-class or higher backgrounds. Documented loss of New York City accent features includes the loss of the coil–curl merger (now almost completely extinct), non-rhoticity, and the extremely raised long vowel [ɔ] (as in talk, cough, or law). Researchers proposed that the motivation behind these recessive trends is the stigmatization of the typical New York City accent since the mid-1900s as being associated with a poorer or working-class background, often also corresponding with particular ethnic identities. While earlier projects detected trends of emphasizing New York City accents as part of a process of social identification, recent research attributes the loss of typical accent features to in-group ethnic distancing. In other words, many of the young generations of ethnic groups who formerly were the most representative speakers of the accent are currently avoiding its features to not stand out socially or ethnically.

== Pronunciation ==
The pronunciation of New York City English, most popularly acknowledged by the term New York accent, is readily noticed and stereotyped, garnering considerable attention in American culture. Some distinctive phonological features include its traditional dropping of r except before vowels, a short-a split system (in which, for example, the a in gas is not assonant to the a in gap), a high gliding /ɔ/ vowel (in words like talk, thought, all, etc. and thus an absence of the cot–caught merger), absence of the Mary–marry–merry merger, and the highly stigmatized (and largely now-extinct) coil–curl merger.

== Vocabulary and grammar ==
These are some words or grammatical constructions used mainly in Greater New York City:

- bodega /boʊˈdeɪgə/: a small neighborhood convenience store; used in recent decades, particularly in New York City though not on Long Island generally; it comes from Spanish, originally meaning "a wine storehouse" via the Puerto Rican Spanish term for "small store; corner store"; by extension, "bodega cats" is the term for the cats that inhabit such establishments. These small stores may also be called delis, which is the short form of delicatessens.
- bubkes /ˈbʌpkəs/: a worthless amount; little or nothing (from Yiddish; probably an abbreviation of kozebubkes, literally, "goat droppings")
- dungarees: an older term for blue jeans
- egg cream: a mixture of cold milk, chocolate or vanilla syrup, and seltzer (carbonated water)
- have a catch: to play a game of catch
- hero: a footlong sandwich or "sub"
- Mischief Night: the night before Halloween
- on line: Metro New Yorkers tend to say they stand on line, whereas most other New York State and American English speakers tend to stand in line.
- punchball and stickball: street variants of baseball, suitable for smaller urban areas, in which a fist or stick substitutes for the bat and a rubber ball (a "Spaldeen") is used
- skel(l): a vagrant, beggar, or small-time street criminal
- s(c)hmuck: an insulting term for an unlikeable man (from Yiddish shmok: "penis")

The word punk tends to be used as a synonym for "weak", "someone unwilling or unable to defend himself" or perhaps "loser", though it appears to descend from an outdated New York African-American English meaning of male receptive participant in anal sex.

== Conversational styles ==
New York City speakers have some unique conversational styles. Linguistics professor Deborah Tannen notes in a New York Times article it has "an emphasis to involve the other person, rather than being considerate. It would be asking questions as a show of interest in the other person, whereas in other parts of [the] country, people don't ask because it might put the person on the spot." Metro New Yorkers "stand closer, talk louder, and leave shorter pauses between exchanges," Tannen said. "I call it 'cooperative overlap'. It's a way of showing interest and enthusiasm, but it's often mistaken for interrupting by people from elsewhere in the country." On the other hand, linguist William Labov demurs, "there's nothing known to linguists about 'normal New York City conversation.'"

== Notable speakers ==
The New York accent has a strong presence in media; pioneer variationist sociolinguist William Labov described it as one of the two most recognizable regional accents of North American English (the other being the Southern accent). The following famous people are native New York City–area speakers—including some speakers of other varieties native to the region—that all demonstrate typical features of the New York accent.

- Robert Abrams
- Bella Abzug
- Eric Adams
- Danny Aiello
- Sal Albanese
- Alan Alda
- John Alite
- Woody Allen
- Iris Apfel
- Carmine Appice
- Alan Arkin
- Jack Armstrong
- Isaac Asimov
- Teddy Atlas
- Scott Baio
- Ralph Bakshi
- Rona Barrett
- Joy Behar
- Tony Bennett
- Shelley Berkley
- Gary Berntsen
- Yasiin Bey
- Lloyd Blankfein
- Humphrey Bogart
- Mike Breen
- Jimmy Breslin
- Mel Brooks
- Edward Brophy
- Lenny Bruce
- Steve Buscemi
- James Caan
- Sid Caesar
- James Cagney
- Theresa Caputo
- Mariah Carey
- George Carlin
- Art Carney
- Robert Caro
- John Catsimatidis
- John Chell
- Hilda Chester
- Andrew Dice Clay
- Michael Cohen
- Linda Cohn
- Pat Cooper
- Howard Cosell
- Billy Crystal
- Andrew Cuomo
- Mario Cuomo
- Tony Curtis
- Al D'Amato
- Rodney Dangerfield
- Tony Danza
- Alphonse D'Arco
- Robert Davi
- Larry David
- The Dead End Kids
- Louis DeJoy
- Don DeLillo
- Robert De Niro
- Alan Dershowitz
- Wayne Diamond
- Vic DiBitetto
- Bo Dietl
- Jamie Dimon
- Dion DiMucci
- Kevin Dobson
- Billy Donovan
- Tommy Dreamer
- Fran Drescher
- Mickey Drexler
- Bubba Ray Dudley
- Jimmy Durante
- Harry Enten
- Jeffrey Epstein
- Peter Falk
- Anthony Fauci
- Fernando Ferrer
- Joan Feynman
- Richard Feynman
- Harvey Fierstein
- Bobby Fischer
- Amy Fisher
- Bobby Flay
- Mike Francesa
- Joe Franklin
- Michael Franzese
- Frank Frazetta
- Ace Frehley
- Ron Galella
- Kathryn Garcia
- John Garfield
- Lou Gehrig
- Ruth Bader Ginsburg
- Rudy Giuliani
- Jackie Gleason
- Whoopi Goldberg
- Vivian Gornick
- Gilbert Gottfried
- Sammy Gravano
- Michael Grimm
- Buddy Hackett
- Pete Hamill
- Stanley Myron Handelman
- Sean Hannity
- Estelle Harris
- Herbert A. Hauptman
- Sophie B. Hawkins
- Amy Heckerling
- Paul Heyman
- Henry Hill
- Judd Hirsch
- Scott Israel
- Jay-Z
- Ron Jeremy
- Billy Joel
- David Johansen
- Meir Kahane
- Ken Kalfus
- Wendy Kaufman
- Harvey Keitel
- Alan King
- Carole King
- Larry King
- Peter King
- Don Kirshner
- Calvin Klein
- Ed Koch
- Michael Kors
- Rich Kotite
- Ed Kranepool
- Kenny Laguna
- Bert Lahr
- Burt Lancaster
- Annie Lanzillotto
- Cyndi Lauper
- Spike Lee
- John Leguizamo
- James Hiroyuki Liao
- William J. Lindsay
- Vince Lombardi
- Linda Lovelace
- Howard Lutnick
- Natasha Lyonne
- Donald MacBride
- Ralph Macchio
- Steve Madden
- Bernie Madoff
- Paulie Malignaggi
- Ed Mangano
- Barry Manilow
- Linda Manz
- Marty Markowitz
- Jason Marquis
- Garry Marshall
- Penny Marshall
- The Marx Brothers; prominently Groucho Marx
- Jackie Mason
- Walter Matthau
- Debi Mazar
- Garry McCarthy
- Al McGuire
- John Mearsheimer
- Allan Melvin
- Method Man
- Al Michaels
- Arthur Miller
- Henry Miller
- Nicki Minaj
- Mob Wives cast
- Robert Moog
- Tracy Morgan
- Chris Mullin
- Jerry Nadler
- Nas
- The Notorious B.I.G.
- Rosie O'Donnell
- Walter O'Malley
- Bill O'Reilly
- Al Pacino
- Ralph Pagano
- Chazz Palminteri
- Joe Paterno
- Rosie Perez
- Rhea Perlman
- Carmine Persico
- Bernadette Peters
- Regis Philbin
- Rick Pitino
- Prodigy (rapper)
- Mario Puzo
- Christine Quinn
- Colin Quinn
- George Raft
- Joey Ramone
- Marky Ramone
- Charles Rangel
- Michael Rapaport
- Genya Ravan
- Domenic Recchia
- Lou Reed
- Paul Reiser
- Charles Nelson Reilly
- Leah Remini
- Busta Rhymes
- Don Rickles
- Thelma Ritter
- Joan Rivers
- Phil Rizzuto
- Doris Roberts
- Ray Romano
- Sid Rosenberg
- Maxie Rosenbloom
- Ja Rule
- Chris Russo
- Vince Russo
- Lynn Samuels
- Bernie Sanders
- Michael Savage
- Telly Savalas
- Anthony Scaramucci
- Chuck Schumer
- Herb Score
- Vin Scully
- Neil Sedaka
- John Patrick Shanley
- Sidney Shapiro
- Judge Judy Sheindlin
- Sheldon Silver
- Phil Silvers
- Paul Simon
- Dean Skelos
- DJ Skribble
- Curtis Sliwa
- Al Smith
- Phil Spector
- Ronnie Spector
- Art Spiegelman
- Sebastian Stan
- Arnold Stang
- Paul Stanley
- Barbara Stanwyck
- Beau Starr
- Mike Starr
- Peter Steele
- Howard Stern
- Jerry Stiller
- Barbra Streisand
- Scott Stringer
- Taz (pro wrestler)
- Johnny Thunders
- Marisa Tomei
- Ronnie Trucchio
- Donald Trump
- John Turturro
- Nicholas Turturro
- Eric Ulrich
- Christopher Walken
- Eli Wallach
- Denzel Washington
- Mary Weiss
- Barry Wellman
- Mae West
- Lenny Wilkens
- Richard D. Wolff
- Janet Yellen

=== Fictional characters ===
Many fictional characters in popular films and television shows have used New York City English, whether or not the actors portraying them are native speakers of the dialect. Some examples are listed below.

- The Bowery Boys
- Archie and Edith Bunker
- Bugs Bunny
- The Cat in the Hat from the film The Cat in the Hat
- Cuphead and Mugman from The Cuphead Show!
- Vinny Gambini and Mona Lisa Vito from My Cousin Vinny
- The Honeymooners cast
- Daniel LaRusso from The Karate Kid movie franchise
- Terry Malloy
- Meowth from the English dub of Pokémon
- Rhoda Morgenstern
- Harley Quinn
- Linda Richman
- Rico "Ratso" Rizzo from Midnight Cowboy
- Rizzo the Rat
- Jerry Seinfeld and George Costanza from Seinfeld
- The Sopranos cast
- The Three Stooges
- Joey Wheeler from the English dub of Yu-Gi-Oh!

== Geographic boundaries ==
The accent is not spoken in the rest of New York State beyond the immediate New York City metropolitan area. Specifically, the upper Hudson Valley mixes New York City and Western New England accent features, while Central and Western New York belong to the same dialect region as Great Lakes cities such as Chicago and Detroit, a dialect region known as the Inland North.

=== New York State ===
New York City English is confined to a geographically small but densely populated area of New York State including all five boroughs of New York City as well as many parts of Long Island; the dialect region spans all of Nassau County and some of Suffolk County. Moreover, the English of the Hudson Valley forms a continuum of speakers who exhibit more features of New York City English the closer they are to the city itself; some of the dialect's features may be heard as far north as the state capital of Albany.

=== Connecticut ===
A small portion of southwestern Connecticut speaks a similar dialect, primarily speakers in Fairfield County and as far as New Haven County.

=== New Jersey ===
The northeastern quarter of New Jersey, prominently Hudson, Bergen, Union, and Essex Counties, including the municipalities of Weehawken, Hoboken, Jersey City, and Newark, plus Middlesex and Monmouth Counties, are all within the New York metropolitan area and thus also home to the major features of New York City English. With the exception of New York City's immediate neighbors like Jersey City and Newark, the New York metropolitan dialect as spoken in New Jersey is rhotic (or fully r-pronouncing) so that, whereas a Brooklynite might pronounce "over there" something like "ovah theah/deah" [oʊvə ˈd̪ɛə], an Elizabeth native might say "over there/dare" [oʊvɚ ˈd̪ɛɚ]. The Atlas of North American English by William Labov et al. shows that the short-a pattern of New York City has diffused to many r-pronouncing communities in northern New Jersey, like Rutherford (Labov's birthplace) and North Plainfield. However, in these communities, the function word constraint of the city's short-a pattern is lost, and the open syllable constraint is used only variably.

==== Notable speakers ====
The following is a list of notable lifelong native speakers of the New York City English of northeastern New Jersey, regardless of their level of rhoticity:

- Jon Bon Jovi
- Chris Christie
- Glenn Danzig
- Danny DeVito
- Tommy DeVito
- Joey Diaz
- James Gandolfini
- Sammi Giancola
- Ed Harris
- Jerramiah Healy
- Tom Heinsohn
- Richard Kind
- William Labov
- Artie Lange
- Jerry Lewis
- Ray Liotta
- Steve Lonegan
- George R. R. Martin
- Gerald McCann
- Bill Pascrell
- Joe Pesci
- Paul Sarlo
- Frank Sinatra
- Patti Stanger
- Rod Steiger
- John Travolta
- Frankie Valli
- Dick Vitale
- Zakk Wylde

== See also ==
- American English regional vocabulary
- Mission brogue
- New Orleans English
- New York Latino English
- North American English regional phonology

== General and cited references ==
- Babbitt, Eugene H. (1896). "The English of the lower classes in New York City and vicinity". Dialect Notes. 1: 457–464.
- Becker, Kara; Wong, Amy Wing Mei (2009). "The Short-a System of New York City English: An Update". University of Pennsylvania Working Papers in Linguistics. 15 (2): 10–20. Archived from the original on July 19, 2010.
- Becker, Kara & Elizabeth Coggshall. 2010. The vowel phonologies of white and African American New York Residents. In Malcah Yaeger-Dror and *Erik R. Thomas (eds.) African American English Speakers And Their Participation In Local Sound Changes: A Comparative Study. American Speech Volume Supplement 94, Number 1. Chapel Hill, NC: Duke University Press. pp: 101–128
- Becker, Kara & Elizabeth L. Coggshall. 2009. The Sociolinguistics of Ethnicity in New York City, Language and Linguistic Compass, 3(3): 751–766.4
- Becker, Kara (2009). "/r/ and the construction of place identity on New York City's Lower East Side". Journal of Sociolinguistics. 13 (5): 634–658. doi:10.1111/j.1467-9841.2009.00426.x.
- Becker, Kara. 2010. Regional Dialect Features on the Lower East Side of New York City: Sociophonetics, Ethnicity, and Identity. Unpublished Doctoral Dissertation, NYU.
- Bonfiglio, Thomas Paul. 2002. Race and the Rise of Standard American. New York: Mouton de Gruyter. 214–225. ISBN 978-3-1101-7189-1.
- Cutler, Cece (1999). "Yorkville Crossing: White teens, hip hop and African American English". Journal of Sociolinguistics. 3 (4): 428–442. doi:10.1111/1467-9481.00089.
- Cutler, Cece (2007). "Hip-hop language in sociolinguistics and beyond". Language and Linguistics Compass, 1(5):519–538. doi:10.1111/j.1749-818X.2007.00021.x.
- Cutler, Cece (2008). "Brooklyn Style: hip-hop markers and racial affiliation among European immigrants". International Journal of Bilingualism, 12(1–2), 7–24.
- Gordon, Matthew (2004). Kortmann, Bernd; Schneider, Edgar W. (eds.). New York, Philadelphia and other Northern Cities. Mouton de Gruyter. ISBN 978-3110175325.
- Hubbell, Allan F. 1972. The Pronunciation of English in New York City. NY: Farrar, Straus, and Giroux.
- Kurath, Hans and Raven I. McDavid. 1961. The Pronunciation of English in the Atlantic States. Ann Arbor: University of Michigan Press.
- Labov, William, Paul Cohen, Clarence Robins, and John Lewis. 1968. A study of the Non-Standard English of Negro and Puerto Rican Speakers in New York City, V. 1: Phonological and Grammatical Analysis. Washington, DC: Office of Education, Bureau of Research/ERIC.
- Labov, William, Paul Cohen, Clarence Robins, and John Lewis. 1968. A study of the Non-Standard English of Negro and Puerto Rican Speakers in New York City', V. 2: The Use of Language in the Speech Community. Washington, DC: Office of Education, Bureau of Research/ERIC.
- Labov, William (1966). The Social Stratification of English in New York City (PDF) (2nd ed.). Cambridge: Cambridge University Press. Archived from the original (PDF) on August 24, 2014.
- Labov, William. 1972a. Language in the Inner City: Studies in the Black English Vernacular. Philadelphia, PA: University of Pennsylvania Press.
- Labov, William. 1972b. Sociolinguistic Patterns. Philadelphia, PA: University of Pennsylvania Press.
- Labov, William (1994) Principles of Linguistic Change: Volume 1: Internal Factors Blackwell ISBN 0-631-17914-3
- Labov, William (2001) Principles of Linguistic Change: Volume 2: Social Factors Blackwell ISBN 0-631-17916-X
- Labov, William (2006). The Social Stratification of English in New York City (2nd ed.). Cambridge University Press. ISBN 978-0521528054.
- Labov, William; Ash, Sharon; Boberg, Charles (2006). The Atlas of North American English. Berlin: Mouton-de Gruyter. ISBN 978-3-11-016746-7.
- Labov, William (June 2007). "Transmission and Diffusion" (PDF). Language.
- Newman, Michael (2005). "New York Talk" in American Voices Walt Wolfram and Ben Ward (eds.). p. 82–87. Blackwell. ISBN 1-4051-2109-2.
- Newman, Michael (2010). "Focusing, implicational scaling, and the dialect status of New York Latino English". Journal of Sociolinguistics. 14 (2): 207–239. doi:10.1111/j.1467-9841.2010.00441.x.
- Schneider, E. W., Kortmann, B. (2005), A Handbook of Varieties of English: A Multi-Media Reference Tool, Mouton de Gruyter, ISBN 3-11-017532-0, p. 284
- Slomanson, Peter; Newman, Michael (2004). "Peer Group Identification and Variation in New York Latino English Laterals". English World-Wide. 25 (2): 199–216. doi:10.1075/eww.25.2.03slo. S2CID 35393553.
- Thomas, C. K. (1932). "Jewish dialect and New York Dialect". American Speech. 7 (5): 321–6. doi:10.2307/452953. JSTOR 452953.
- Thomas, C. K. (1942). "Pronunciation in downstate New York". American Speech. 17 (1): 30–41. doi:10.2307/486854. JSTOR 486854.
- Thomas, C. K. (1947). "The place of New York City in American linguistic geography". Quarterly Journal of Speech. 33 (3): 314–20. doi:10.1080/00335634709381312.
- Wells, J. C. 1982. Accents of English. 3 vols. Cambridge: Cambridge University Press.
- Wolfram, Walt. 1974. Sociolinguistic Aspects of Assimilation: Puerto Rican English in New York City. Washington, DC: Center for Applied Linguistics.
- Wolfram, Walt & Natalie Schilling Estes (2006) American English 2nd edition Blackwell ISBN 1-4051-1265-4
- Wolfram, Walt & Ward, Ben (2005) American Voices: How Dialects Differ from Coast to Coast Blackwell ISBN 1-4051-2109-2
- Wong, Amy (2007). "Two Vernacular Features in the English of Four American-Born Chinese". University of Pennsylvania Working Papers in Linguistics. 13 (2): 217–230.
