= Rhoticity in English =

Pronunciation of 'r' across English dialects

Examples of a rhotic and a non-rhotic speaker
Rhotic (American) speaker
/ˈfɑrmər/ for farmer

Non-rhotic (British) speaker
/ˈfɑːmə/ for farmer

The distinction between rhoticity and non-rhoticity is one of the most prominent ways in which varieties of the English language are classified. In rhotic accents, the sound of the historical English rhotic consonant, /r/, is preserved in all phonetic environments. In non-rhotic accents, speakers no longer pronounce /r/ in postvocalic environments: when it is immediately after a vowel and not followed by another vowel. For example, a rhotic English speaker pronounces the words hard and butter as /ˈhɑːrd/ and /ˈbʌtər/, but a non-rhotic speaker "drops" or "deletes" the /r/ sound and pronounces them as /ˈhɑːd/ and /ˈbʌtə/. (Note: Other terms synonymous with "non-rhotic" include "/r/-deleting", "r-dropping", "r-vocalizing", and "r-less"; synonyms for "rhotic" include "/r/-pronouncing", "r-constricting", and "r-ful".) When an r is at the end of a word but the next word begins with a vowel, as in the phrase "better apples," most non-rhotic speakers will preserve the /r/ in that position (the linking R), because it is followed by a vowel.

The rhotic dialects of English include most of those in Scotland, Ireland, the United States, and Canada. The non-rhotic dialects include most of those in England, Wales, Australia, New Zealand, and South Africa. Among certain speakers, like some in the northeastern coastal and southern United States, rhoticity is a sociolinguistic variable: postvocalic /r/ is deleted depending on an array of social factors, such as being more correlated in the 21st century with lower socioeconomic status, greater age, particular ethnic identities, and informal speaking contexts. These correlations have varied through the last two centuries, and in many cases speakers of traditionally non-rhotic American dialects are now rhotic or variably rhotic. Dialects of English that stably show variable rhoticity or semi-rhoticity also exist around the world, including many dialects of India, Pakistan, and the Caribbean.

Evidence from written documents suggests that loss of postvocalic /r/ began sporadically in England during the mid-15th century, but those /r/-less spellings were uncommon and were restricted to private documents, especially those written by women. In the mid-18th century, postvocalic /r/ was still pronounced in most environments, but by the 1740s to the 1770s, it was often deleted entirely, especially after low vowels. By the early 19th century, the southern British standard was fully transformed into a non-rhotic variety, but some variation persisted as late as the 1870s.

In the 18th century, some southern and eastern American port cities with close connections to Britain dropped postvocalic /r/ due to British English influence, thus causing their upper-class pronunciation to become non-rhotic, while other American regions remained rhotic. Non-rhoticity then became the norm more widely in many eastern and southern regions of the United States, as well as generally prestigious, until the 1860s, when the American Civil War began to shift American centers of wealth and political power to rhotic areas, which had fewer cultural connections to the old colonial and British elites. Non-rhotic American speech continued to hold some level of prestige up until the mid-20th century, but rhotic speech in particular became rapidly prestigious nationwide after World War II, for example as reflected in the national standard of mass media (like radio, film, and television) being firmly rhotic since the mid-20th century onwards.

== History ==
=== Southeastern England ===
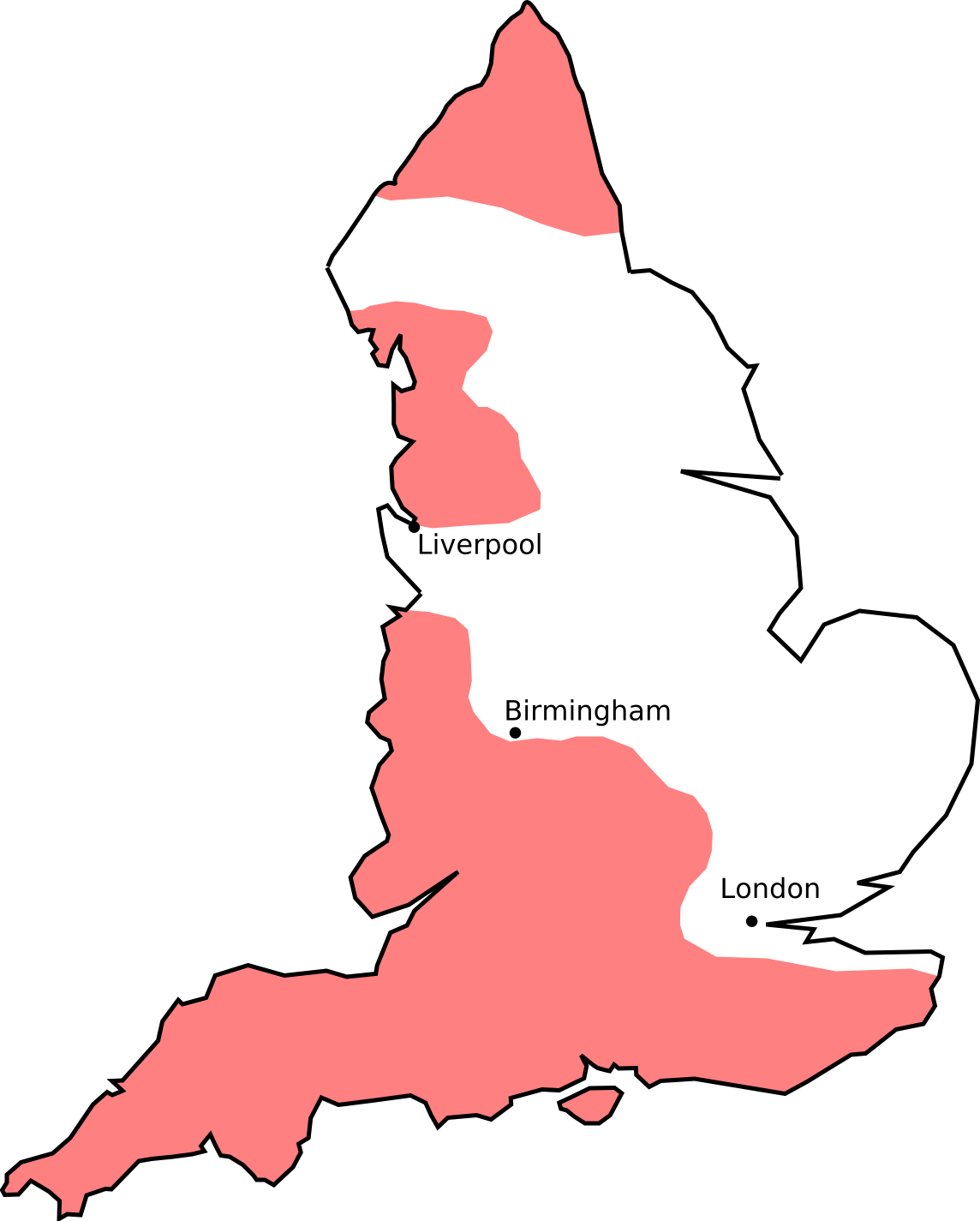
Red areas indicate where rural English accents were rhotic in the 1950s.

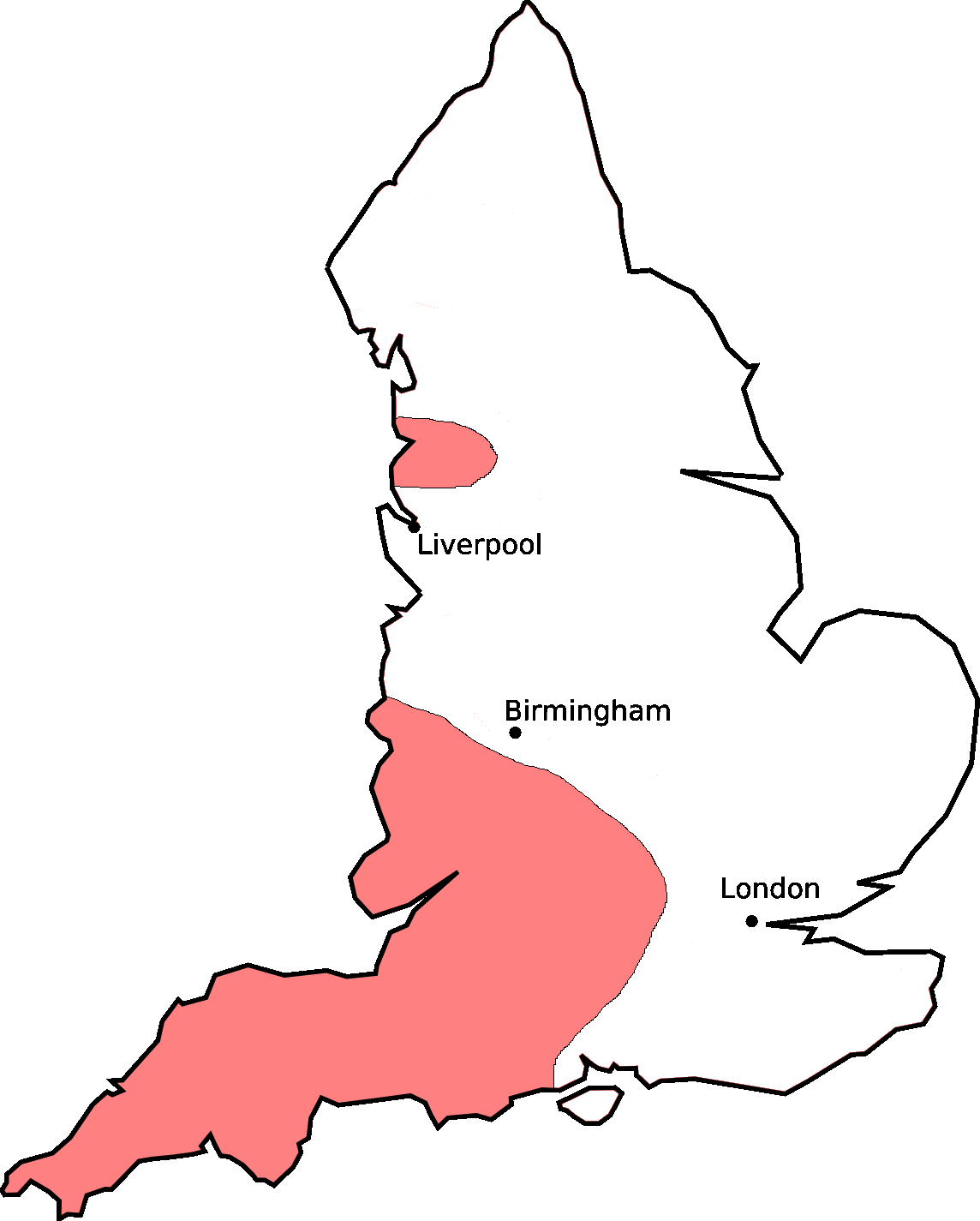
Red areas are where English dialects of the late 20th century were rhotic.

The earliest traces of a loss of /r/ in English appear in the early 15th century. First, they occur before coronal consonants, especially /s/, giving modern ass 'buttocks' (Old English: ears, Middle English: ers or ars), and bass (fish) (OE bærs, ME bars). A second phase of the loss of /r/ during that same century was characterized by sporadic and lexically variable deletion, such as monyng 'morning' and cadenall 'cardinal'. Both types of evidence come from southeastern England. Those spellings without /r/ appeared throughout the 16th and 17th centuries, but they were uncommon and were restricted to private documents, especially those written by women. No English authorities described loss of /r/ in the standard language before the mid-18th century, and many did not fully accept it until around 1800.

During the mid-17th century, several sources described /r/ as being weakened but still present. The English playwright Ben Jonson's English Grammar, published posthumously in 1640, recorded that /r/ was "sounded firme in the beginning of words, and more liquid in the middle, and ends." The next major documentation of the pronunciation of /r/ appeared a century later, in 1740, when the British author of a primer for French students of southern English said that "in many words r before a consonant is greatly softened, almost mute, and slightly lengthens the preceding vowel."

By the 1770s, pre-consonantal /r/-less pronunciation was becoming common around London even in formal educated speech. The English actor and linguist John Walker used the spelling ar to indicate the long vowel of aunt in his 1775 rhyming dictionary. In his influential Critical Pronouncing Dictionary and Expositor of the English Language (1791), Walker reported, with a strong tone of disapproval, that "the r in lard, bard,... is pronounced so much in the throat as to be little more than the middle or Italian a, lengthened into baa, baad...." Americans returning to England after the American Revolutionary War, which lasted from 1775 to 1783, reported surprise at the significant changes in the fashionable pronunciation that had taken place.

=== Elsewhere in England ===
By the early 19th century, the southern English standard had been fully transformed into a non-rhotic variety, but it continued to be variable in the 1870s. The extent of rhoticity in England in the mid-19th century is summarized as widespread in the book New Zealand English: its Origins and Evolution:

[T]he only areas of England... for which we have no evidence of rhoticity in the mid-nineteenth century lie in two separate corridors. The first runs south from the North Riding of Yorkshire through the Vale of York into north and central Lincolnshire, nearly all of Nottinghamshire, and adjacent areas of Derbyshire, Leicestershire, and Staffordshire. The second includes all of Norfolk, western Suffolk and Essex, eastern Cambridgeshire and Hertfordshire, Middlesex, and northern Surrey and Kent.

In the late 19th century, Alexander John Ellis found evidence of accents being overwhelmingly rhotic in urban areas that are now firmly non-rhotic, such as Birmingham and the Black Country, and Wakefield in West Yorkshire.

The Survey of English Dialects in the 1950s and the 1960s recorded rhotic or partially-rhotic accents in almost every part of England, including in the counties of West Yorkshire, East Yorkshire, Lincolnshire and Kent, where rhoticity has since disappeared. The Atlas Linguarum Europae found that there was still rhoticity in the West Yorkshire site of Golcar as late as 1976. A study published in 2014 found that there is still some rhoticity amongst older residents of Berwick upon Tweed and Carlisle, both of which are close to the border with rhotic Scotland, but that this was absent from the majority of inhabitants.

=== United States ===
The loss of postvocalic /r/ in the British prestige standard in the late 18th and the early 19th centuries influenced American port cities with close connections to Britain, which caused upper-class pronunciation to become non-rhotic in many Eastern and Southern port cities such as New York City, Boston, Alexandria, Charleston, and Savannah. Like regional dialects in England, however, the accents of other areas in the United States remained rhotic in a display of linguistic "lag", which preserved the original pronunciation of /r/.

Non-rhotic pronunciation continued to influence American prestige speech until the American Civil War of the 1860s began shifting the United States centers of wealth and political power to areas with fewer cultural connections to the old colonial and British elites. Still, the non-rhotic prestige persisted in the Eastern United States and among the upper class even into the early 20th century, by which time many speakers of the East and South were non-rhotic or variably rhotic, often even regardless of their class background.

The most decisive shift of the general American population towards rhoticity (even in previously non-rhotic regions) followed the Second World War. For instance, rapidly after the 1940s, the standard broadcasting pronunciation heard in national radio and television became firmly rhotic, aligned more with the General American English of Midwestern, Western, and non-coastal Americans. The prestige of non-rhoticity thus reversed, with non-rhoticity in the 20th century up until today increasingly associated with lower-class rather than higher-class speakers, as in New York City.

The biggest strongholds of non-rhoticity in the United States have always been eastern New England, New York City, and the former plantation region of the South: a band from the South's Atlantic Coast west to the Mississippi River. However, non-rhoticity has been notably declining in all three of these areas since the mid-20th century. In fact, a strongly articulated /r/, alongside full rhoticity, has been dominant throughout the South since then. African-American Vernacular English, meanwhile, continues to be largely non-rhotic since most African Americans originate from the former plantation region, where non-rhotic speech dominated in the past.

== Modern pronunciation ==
In most non-rhotic accents, if a word ending in written "r" is followed immediately by a word beginning with a vowel, the /r/ is pronounced, as in water ice. That phenomenon is referred to as "linking R." Many non-rhotic speakers also insert an epenthetic /r/ between vowels when the first vowel is one that can occur before syllable-final r (drawring for drawing). The so-called "intrusive R" has been stigmatised, but many speakers of Received Pronunciation (RP) now frequently "intrude" an epenthetic /r/ at word boundaries, especially if one or both vowels is schwa. For example, the idea of it becomes the idea-r-of it, Australia and New Zealand becomes Australia-r-and New Zealand, the formerly well-known India-r-Office and "Laura Norder" (Law and Order). The typical alternative used by RP speakers (and some rhotic speakers as well) is to insert an intrusive glottal stop wherever an intrusive r would otherwise have been placed.

For non-rhotic speakers, what was once a vowel, followed by /r/, is now usually realized as a long vowel. That is called compensatory lengthening, which occurs after the elision of a sound. In RP and many other non-rhotic accents card, fern, born are thus pronounced [kɑːd], [fɜːn], [bɔːn] or similar (actual pronunciations vary from accent to accent). That length may be retained in phrases and so car pronounced in isolation is [kɑː], but car owner is [ˈkɑːrəʊnə]. A final schwa usually remains short and so water in isolation is [wɔːtə].

In RP and similar accents, the vowels /iː/ and /uː/ (or /ʊ/), when they are followed by r, become diphthongs that end in schwa and so near is [nɪə] and poor is [pʊə]. They have other realizations as well, including monophthongal ones. Once again, the pronunciations vary from accent to accent. The same happens to diphthongs followed by r, but they may be considered to end in rhotic speech in /ər/, which reduces to schwa, as usual, in non-rhotic speech. In isolation, tire, is pronounced [taɪə] and sour is [saʊə]. For some speakers, some long vowels alternate with a diphthong ending in schwa and so wear may be [wɛə] but wearing [ˈwɛːrɪŋ].

The compensatory lengthening view is challenged by Wells, who stated that during the 17th century, stressed vowels followed by /r/ and another consonant or word boundary underwent a lengthening process, known as pre-r lengthening. The process was not a compensatory lengthening process but an independent development, which explains modern pronunciations featuring both [ɜː] (bird, fur) and [ɜːr] (stirring, stir it) according to their positions: [ɜːr] was the regular outcome of the lengthening, which shortened to [ɜː] after r-dropping occurred in the 18th century. The lengthening involved "mid and open short vowels" and so the lengthening of /ɑː/ in car was not a compensatory process caused by r-dropping.

Even General American commonly drops the /r/ in non-final unstressed syllables if another syllable in the same word also contains /r/, which may be referred to as r-dissimilation. Examples include the dropping of the first /r/ in the words surprise, governor, and caterpillar. In more careful speech, all /r/ sounds are still retained.

== Distribution ==
Classification of English dialects by rhoticity

Rhotic accents include most varieties of Scottish English, Irish or Hiberno-English, Canadian English, American English, Barbadian English and Philippine English.

Non-rhotic accents include most varieties of English English, Welsh English, Australian English, South African English, Nigerian English, Trinidadian and Tobagonian English, Standard Malaysian English and Singaporean English.

Non-rhotic accents have been dominant in New Zealand English since the 1870s, but in general rhoticity is increasing quickly. Rhotic New Zealand English was historically restricted to Southland (the "Southland burr") but rhoticity now is widely used in a region stretching from South Auckland down into the upper North Island, and elsewhere particularly among Pasifika communities. This particular rhoticism manifests itself mostly in the nurse vowel, but with the force vowel often remaining non-rhotic.

Semi-rhotic accents have also been studied, such as Jamaican English, in which r is pronounced (as in even non-rhotic accents) before vowels, but also in stressed monosyllables or stressed syllables at the ends of words (e.g. in "car" or "dare"). It is not pronounced at the end of unstressed syllables (e.g. in "water") or before consonants (e.g. "market").

Variably rhotic accents are widely documented, in which deletion of r (when not before vowels) is optional. In these dialects the probability of deleting r may vary depending on social, stylistic, and contextual factors. Variably rhotic accents comprise much of Indian English, Pakistani English, and Caribbean English, for example, as spoken in Tobago, Guyana, Antigua and Barbuda, and the Bahamas. They include current-day New York City English, most modern varieties of Southern American English, New York Latino English, and some Eastern New England English, as well as some varieties of Scottish English.

Non-rhotic accents in the Americas include those of the rest of the Caribbean and Belize. There are people with non-rhotic accents who are children of at least one rhotic-accented parent but grew up, or were educated, in non-rhotic countries like Australia, England, New Zealand, South Africa, or Wales. By contrast, people who have at least one non-rhotic-accented parent but were raised or started their education in Canada, any rhotic Caribbean country, Ireland, Scotland, or the United States speak with rhotic accents.

=== England ===
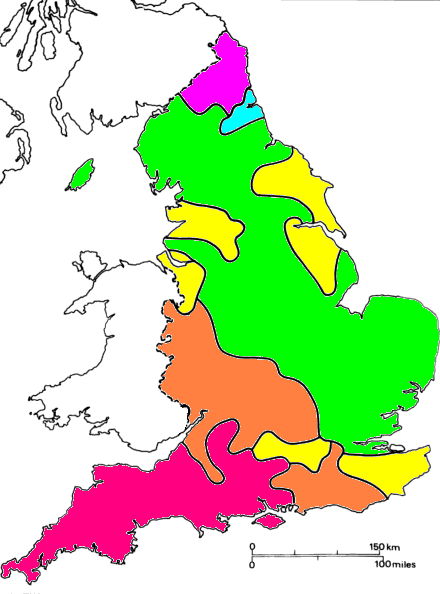
Final post-vocalic /r/ in farmer in English rural dialects of the 1950s [ə] (non-rhotic) [əʴ] (alveolar) [əʵ] (retroflex) [əʵː] (retroflex & long) [əʶ] (uvular) [ɔʶ] (back & rounded)

Most English varieties in England are non-rhotic today, which stems from a trend in southeastern England that accelerated from the very late 18th century onwards. Rhotic accents are still found south and west of a line from near Shrewsbury to around Portsmouth (especially in the West Country), in the Corby area because of migration from Scotland in the 1930s, in some of Lancashire (north and west of the centre of Manchester, increasingly among older and rural speakers only), in some parts of Yorkshire and Lincolnshire, and in the areas that border Scotland.

The prestige form exerts a steady pressure toward non-rhoticity. Thus, the urban speech of Bristol or Southampton is more accurately described as variably rhotic, the degree of rhoticity being reduced as one moves up the class and formality scales.

=== Scotland ===
Most Scottish accents are rhotic. Non-rhotic speech has been reported in Edinburgh since the 1970s and Glasgow since the 1980s.

=== Wales ===
Welsh English is mostly non-rhotic, but variable rhoticity is present in accents influenced by Welsh, especially in North Wales. Additionally, while Port Talbot English is largely non-rhotic, some speakers may supplant the front vowel of bird with /ɚ/.

=== United States ===
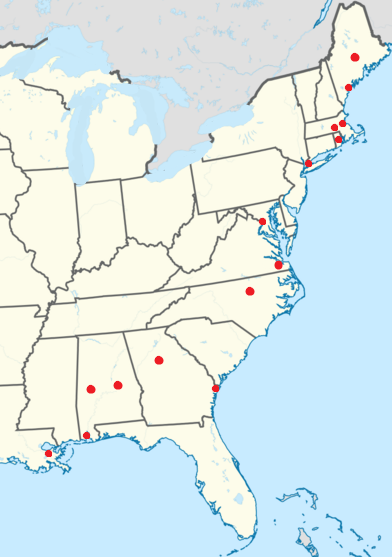
Red dots show major U.S. cities where the 2006 Atlas of North American English found 50% or higher of non-rhotic speech in at least one White speaker within their data sample. Non-rhotic speech may be found in speakers of African-American English throughout the country.

American English is now predominantly rhotic. In the late 19th century, non-rhotic accents were common throughout much of the coastal Eastern and Southern United States, including along the Gulf Coast. Non-rhotic accents were established in all major U.S. cities along the Atlantic coast except for the Philadelphia metropolitan area, centered on Philadelphia and Baltimore, because of its early Scots-Irish rhotic influence.

After the American Civil War and even more intensely during the early-to-mid-20th century, presumably correlated with the Second World War, rhotic accents began to gain social prestige nationwide, even in the aforementioned areas that were traditionally non-rhotic. Thus, non-rhotic accents are increasingly perceived by Americans as sounding foreign or less educated because of an association with working-class or immigrant speakers in Eastern and Southern cities, and rhotic accents are increasingly perceived as sounding more "General American".

Today, non-rhoticity in the American South among Whites is found primarily among older speakers and only in some areas such as central and southern Alabama, Savannah, Georgia, and Norfolk, Virginia, as well as in the Yat accent of New Orleans. It is still very common all across the South and across all age groups among African American speakers.

The local dialects of eastern New England, especially that of Boston, Massachusetts and extending into the states of Maine and (less so) New Hampshire, show some non-rhoticity along with the traditional Rhode Island dialect, although this feature has been receding in recent generations. The New York City dialect has traditionally been non-rhotic, but William Labov more precisely classifies its current form as variably rhotic, with many of its sub-varieties actually being fully rhotic, such as that of northeastern New Jersey.

African-American Vernacular English (AAVE) is largely non-rhotic, and in some non-rhotic Southern and AAVE accents, there is no linking r; that is, /r/ at the end of a word is deleted even when the following word starts with a vowel; thus, "Mister Adams" is pronounced [mɪstə(ʔ)ˈædəmz]. In a few such accents, intervocalic /r/ is deleted before an unstressed syllable even within a word if the following syllable begins with a vowel. In such accents, pronunciations like [kæəˈlaːnə] for Carolina, or [bɛːˈʌp] for "bear up" are heard.

This pronunciation occurs in AAVE and occurred for many older non-rhotic Southern speakers. AAVE spoken in areas in which non-AAVE speakers are rhotic is likelier to be rhotic. Rhoticity is generally more common among younger AAVE-speakers.

Typically, even non-rhotic modern varieties of American English pronounce the /r/ in /ɜːr/ (as in "bird", "work", or "perky") and realize it, as in most rhotic varieties, as [ɚ] (an r-colored mid central vowel) or [əɹ] (a sequence of a mid central vowel and a postalveolar or retroflex approximant).

=== Canada ===
Canadian English is entirely rhotic except for small isolated areas in southwestern New Brunswick, parts of Newfoundland, and the Lunenburg English variety spoken in Lunenburg and Shelburne Counties, Nova Scotia, which may be non-rhotic or variably rhotic.

=== Ireland ===
The prestige form of English spoken in Ireland is rhotic and most regional accents are rhotic, but some regional accents, particularly in the area around counties Louth and Cavan are notably non-rhotic and many non-prestige accents have touches of non-rhoticity. In Dublin, the traditional local dialect is largely non-rhotic, but the more modern varieties, referred to by Hickey as "mainstream Dublin English" and "fashionable Dublin English", are fully rhotic. Hickey used that as an example of how English in Ireland does not follow prestige trends in England.

=== Asia ===
The English spoken in Asia is predominantly rhotic. In the case of the Philippines, that may be explained because Philippine English is heavily influenced by the American dialect and because of Spanish influence in the various Philippine languages. Many East Asians in mainland China, Japan, Korea, and Taiwan who have a good command of English generally have rhotic accents because of the influence of American English. That excludes Hong Kong, whose English dialect is a result of its almost 150-year history as a British Crown colony and later a British dependent territory. However, especially in news broadcasts, commercials and government announcements, the American accent is increasingly more common.

The lack of consonant /r/ in Cantonese contributes to the phenomenon, but has rhoticity started to exist because of the handover in 1997 and influence by the US and East Asian entertainment industries. Many older and younger speakers among South and East Asians have a non-rhotic accent. Speakers of Semitic (Arabic, Hebrew, etc.), Turkic (Turkish, Azeri, etc.), Iranian languages (Persian, Kurdish, etc.) in West Asia speak English with a rhotic pronunciation because of the inherent phonotactics of their native languages.

Indian English can vary between being non-rhotic due to the traditional influence of Received Pronunciation (RP) or rhotic from the underlying phonotactics of the native Indo-Aryan and Dravidian languages and the growing influence of American English. Other Asian regions with non-rhotic English are Malaysia, Singapore, and Brunei. A typical Malaysian's English would be almost totally non-rhotic because of the nonexistence of rhotic endings in both languages of influence. A more educated Malaysian's English may be non-rhotic because Standard Malaysian English is based on RP.

The classical English spoken in Brunei is non-rhotic. A change that seems to be taking place is that Brunei English is now becoming rhotic from the influence of American English, from the influence of Standard Malay, which is rhotic, and from influence of the languages of Indians in Brunei, Tamil and Punjabi. Rhoticity is used by Chinese Bruneians. The English in the neighbouring Malaysia and Singapore remains non-rhotic. In Brunei English, rhoticity is equal to Philippine dialects of English and Scottish and Irish dialects. Non-rhoticity is mostly found in older generations. The phenomenon is almost similar to the status of American English, which has greatly reduced non-rhoticity.

A typical teenager's Southeast Asian English would be rhotic, mainly from the prominent influence by American English. Spoken English in Myanmar is non-rhotic, but there are a number of English speakers with a rhotic or partially-rhotic pronunciation. Sri Lankan English may be rhotic.

=== Africa ===
The English spoken in most of Africa is based on RP and is generally non-rhotic. Pronunciation and variation in African English accents are largely affected by native African language influences, level of education, and exposure to Western influences. The English accents spoken in the coastal areas of West Africa are primarily non-rhotic because of the underlying varieties of Niger-Congo languages that are spoken in that part of West Africa.

Rhoticity may exist in the English that is spoken in the areas in which rhotic Afro-Asiatic or Nilo-Saharan languages are spoken across northern West Africa and in the Nilotic regions of East Africa. More modern trends show an increasing American influence on African English pronunciation particularly among younger urban affluent populations, which may overstress the American rhotic "r", which creates a pseudo-Americanised accent.

By and large, the official spoken English used in post-colonial African countries is non-rhotic. Standard Liberian English is also non-rhotic because its liquids are lost at the end of words or before consonants. South African English is mostly non-rhotic, especially in the Cultivated dialect, which is based on RP, except for some Broad varieties spoken in the Cape Province (typically in -er suffixes, as in writer). It appears that postvocalic /r/ is entering the speech of younger people under the influence of American English and perhaps of the Scottish dialect that was brought by the Scottish settlers.

=== Australia ===
Standard Australian English is non-rhotic. A degree of rhoticity has been observed in a particular sublect of the Australian Aboriginal English spoken on the coast of South Australia, especially in speakers from the Point Pearce and Raukkan settlements. These speakers realise /r/ as [ɹ] in the preconsonantal, postvocalic position (after a vowel and before a consonant), though only within stems: [boːɹd] "board", [tʃɜɹtʃ] "church", [pɜɹθ] "Perth"; but [flæː] "flour", [dɒktə] "doctor", [jɪəz] "years". It has been speculated that the feature may derive from the fact that many of the first settlers in coastal South Australia, including Cornish tin-miners, Scottish missionaries, and American whalers, spoke rhotic varieties.

=== New Zealand ===
New Zealand English is predominantly non-rhotic. Southland and parts of Otago in the far south of New Zealand's South Island are rhotic from apparent Scottish influence. Many Māori and Pasifika people, who tend to speak a specific dialect of English, speak with a strong "r," but they are not the only ones to do so. Older Southland speakers use /ɹ/ variably after vowels, but younger speakers now use /ɹ/ only with the NURSE vowel and occasionally with the LETTER vowel. Younger Southland speakers pronounce /ɹ/ in third term /ˌθɵːɹd ˈtɵːɹm/ (General NZE pronunciation: /ˌθɵːd ˈtɵːm/) but only sometimes in farm cart /ˈfɐːm ˌkɐːt/ (usually the same as in General NZE).

Non-prevocalic /ɹ/ among non-rhotic speakers is sometimes pronounced in a few words, including Ireland /ˈɑɪəɹlənd/, merely /ˈmiəɹli/, err /ɵːɹ/, and the name of the letter R /ɐːɹ/ (General NZE pronunciations: /ˈɑɪələnd, ˈmiəli, ɵː, ɐː/). The Māori accent varies from the European-origin New Zealand accent. Some Māori speakers are semi-rhotic. That feature is not clearly identified to any particular region or attributed to any defined language shift. The Māori language tends to pronounce "r" as usually an alveolar tap [ɾ], like in the Scottish dialect.

== Mergers characteristic of non-rhotic accents ==
Some phonemic mergers are characteristic of non-rhotic accents and usually include one item that historically contained an R, which has been lost in the non-rhotic accent, and another that never did so.

=== /ɛə/–/ɛər/ merger ===
A merger of words like bad and bared occurs, in some dialects of North American English, as an effect of two historical developments. First, when the TRAP vowel is sporadically raised, creating a new phoneme /ɛə/ distinct from /æ/. Second, when this occurs in non-rhotic dialects, there is potential for the /ɛə/ phoneme to merge with SQUARE, causing bad and bared to become homophones. Thus, the merger occurs almost exclusively in some New York City English. In extreme cases, these two can also merge with NEAR, causing bad and bared to become homophonous with beard.

Homophonous pairs
/ɛə/	/ɛər/	IPA	Notes
add	aired	ɛəd	
bad	bared	bɛəd	
cad	cared	kɛəd	
can	cairn	kɛən	
dad	dared	dɛəd	
fad	fared	fɛəd	
pad	paired	pɛəd	
scad	scared	skɛəd	
shad	shared	ʃɛəd	
spaz	spares	spɛəz	
swazz	swears	swɛəz	

=== /ʌ/–/ɜːr/ merger ===
A merger of words like bud and bird (/ɜːr/ and /ʌ/) occurs for some speakers of Jamaican English and makes bud and bird homophones as /bʌd/. The conversion of /ɜːr/ to [ʌ] or [ə] is also found in places scattered around England and Scotland. Some speakers, mostly rural, in the area from London to Norfolk exhibit this conversion, mainly before voiceless fricatives. This gives pronunciation like first [fʌst] and worse [wʌs].

Homophonous pairs
/ʌ/	/ɜːr/	IPA	Notes
blood	blurred	ˈblʌd	
bud	bird	ˈbʌd	
bug	berg	ˈbʌɡ	
bug	burg	ˈbʌɡ	
bugger	burger	ˈbʌɡə	
bummer	Burma	ˈbʌmə	
bun	burn	ˈbʌn	
bunt	burnt	ˈbʌnt	
bust	burst	ˈbʌst	
cluck	clerk	ˈklʌk	
colo(u)r	curler	ˈkʌlə	
cub	curb	ˈkʌb	
cud	curd	ˈkʌd	
cuddle	curdle	ˈkʌdəl	
cull	curl	ˈkʌl	
cut	curt	ˈkʌt	
duck	dirk	ˈdʌk	
fun	fern	ˈfʌn	
fussed	first	ˈfʌst	
fuzz	furs	ˈfʌz	
gull	girl	ˈɡʌl	
gully	girly	ˈɡʌli	
huddle	hurdle	ˈhʌdəl	
hull	hurl	ˈhʌl	
Hun	urn	ˈʌn	With H-dropping.
hut	hurt	ˈhʌt	
luck	lurk	ˈlʌk	
muck	murk	ˈmʌk	
puck	perk	ˈpʌk	
pus	purse	ˈpʌs	
putt	pert	ˈpʌt	
shuck	shirk	ˈʃʌk	
shut	shirt	ˈʃʌt	
spun	spurn	ˈspʌn	
stud	stirred	ˈstʌd	
such	search	ˈsʌtʃ	
suck	cirque	ˈsʌk	
suckle	circle	ˈsʌkəl	
suffer	surfer	ˈsʌfə	
sully	surly	ˈsʌli	
ton(ne)	tern, turn	ˈtʌn	
tough	turf	ˈtʌf	
tuck	Turk	ˈtʌk	

=== Comma–letter merger ===
In the terminology of John C. Wells, this consists of the merger of the lexical sets comma and letter. It is found in all or nearly all non-rhotic accents and is present even in some accents that are in other respects rhotic, such as those of some speakers in Jamaica and the Bahamas.

In some accents, syllabification may interact with rhoticity and result in homophones for which non-rhotic accents have centering diphthongs. Possibilities include Korea–career, Shi'a–sheer, and Maia–mire, and skua may be identical with the second syllable of obscure.

Homophonous pairs
/ə/	/ər/	IPA	Notes
area	airier	ˈɛəriə	
cheetah	cheater	ˈtʃiːtə	
coda	coder	ˈkoʊdə	
coma	comber	ˈkoʊmə	
custody	custardy	ˈkʌstədi	
Ghana	garner	ˈɡɑːnə	
feta	fetter	ˈfɛtə	
formally	formerly	ˈfɔːməli	
karma	calmer	ˈkɑːmə	
Lima	lemur	ˈliːmə	
Luna	lunar	ˈl(j)uːnə	
manna	manner, manor	ˈmænə	
mynah	miner, minor	ˈmaɪnə	
panda	pander	ˈpændə	
parka	Parker	ˈpɑːkə	
pita	Peter	ˈpiːtə	"Pita" may also be pronounced /ˈpɪtə/ and therefore not merged.
rota	rotor	ˈroʊtə	
schema	schemer	ˈskiːmə	
taiga	tiger	ˈtaɪɡə	
terra	terror	ˈtɛrə	
tuba	tuber	ˈt(j)uːbə	
tuna	tuner	ˈt(j)uːnə	
Vespa	vesper	ˈvɛspə	
Wanda	wander	ˈwɒndə	
Wicca	wicker	ˈwɪkə	

==== Polysyllabic morpheme-final /ɪd/–/əd/–/ərd/ merger ====
A merger of words like batted and battered is present in non-rhotic accents which have undergone the weak vowel merger. Such accents include Australian, New Zealand, most South African and some non-rhotic English (e.g. Norfolk, Sheffield) speech. The third edition of Longman Pronunciation Dictionary lists /əd/ (and /əz/ mentioned below) as possible (though less common than /ɪd/ and /ɪz/) British pronunciations, which means that the merger is an option even in RP.

A large number of homophonous pairs involve the syllabic -es and agentive -ers suffixes, such as merges-mergers and bleaches-bleachers. Because they are so numerous, they are excluded from the list of homophonous pairs below.

Homophonous pairs
/ɪ̈/	/ər/	IPA	Notes
batted	battered	ˈbætəd	
betted	bettered	ˈbɛtəd	
busted	bustard	ˈbʌstəd	
butches	butchers	ˈbʊtʃəz	
butted	buttered	ˈbʌtəd	
charted	chartered	ˈtʃɑːtəd	
chatted	chattered	ˈtʃætəd	
founded	foundered	ˈfaʊndəd	
humid	humo(u)red	ˈhjuːməd	
matted	mattered	ˈmætəd	
patted	pattered	ˈpætəd	
pitches	pitchers	ˈpɪtʃəz	
scatted	scattered	ˈskætəd	
splendid	splendo(u)red	ˈsplɛndəd	
tended	tendered	ˈtɛndəd	

==== Polysyllabic morpheme-final /oʊ/–/ə/–/ər/ merger ====
A conditioned merger of EME /oː/ and /ou/ with /ə/ and /ər/ is similar to the weak vowel merger, and like it occurs only in unstressed positions and only in certain words. In Cockney, the merged vowel is usually [ɐ], so that fellow is homophonous with feller and fella as [ˈfelɐ] (phonemically /ˈfɛlə/); thus, words like yellow, marrow, potato, follow, etc. take a similar path. The mid [ə] occurs in other non-rhotic accents, such as some older Southern American English. An r-colored /ər/ occurs instead in rhotic accents, for instance in parts of the west of England and in some deep Southern American English, like Appalachian English, preserving the Middle English phonotactic constraint against final /ə/: [ˈjɛlɚ]. In other words, in traditional Appalachian dialect, the final /ə/ (as in data and sofa) is distinctly r-colored, thus yielding the same merger as in Cockney but with a distinct phonetic output. Both phenomena are restricted to the broadest varieties of English.

In Cockney, the resulting /ə/ is subject to /r/-insertion, as in tomato and cucumber production [təˈmɑːʔ(ə)ɹ ən ˈkjʉːkʌmbə pɹəˈdʌkʃn̩].

In RP, there are certain prefixes such as crypto-, electro- and socio- that have a free variation between /əʊ/ and /ə/ before consonants, although in some words the unreduced /əʊ/ is preferred. Before vowels, only /əʊ/ occurs.

Homophonous pairs
/oʊ/	/ər/	IPA	Notes
hollow	holler	ˈhɒlə(r)	
pillow	pillar	ˈpɪlə(r)	
winnow	winner	ˈwɪnə(r)	

=== /eɪ/–/ɛər/–/ɪər/ merger ===
The merger of the lexical sets FACE, SQUARE and NEAR is possible in some Jamaican English and partially also in Northern East Anglian English.

In Jamaica, the merger occurs after deletion of the postvocalic /r/ in a preconsonantal position, so that fade can be homophonous with feared as [feːd], but day [deː] is normally distinct from dear [deːɹ], though vowels in both words can be analyzed as belonging to the same phoneme (followed by /r/ in the latter case, so that the merger of FACE and SQUARE/NEAR does not occur). In Jamaican Patois, the merged vowel is an opening diphthong [iɛ] and that realization can also be heard in Jamaican English, mostly before a sounded /r/ (so that fare and fear can be both [feːɹ] and [fiɛɹ]), but sometimes also in other positions. Alternatively, /eː/ can be laxed to [ɛ] before a sounded /r/, which produces a variable Mary-merry merger: [fɛɹ].

It is possible in northern East Anglian varieties (to [e̞ː]), but only in the case of items descended from ME /aː/, such as daze. Those descended from ME /ai/ (such as days), /ɛi/ and /ɛih/ have a distinctive /æi/ vowel. The merger appears to be receding, as items descended from ME /aː/ are being transferred to the /æi/ class; in other words, a pane-pain merger is taking place. In the southern dialect area, the pane-pain merger is complete and all three vowels are distinct: FACE is [æi], SQUARE is [ɛː] and NEAR is [ɪə].

A near-merger of FACE and SQUARE is possible in General South African English, but the vowels typically remain distinct as [eɪ] (for FACE) and [eː] (for SQUARE). The difference between the two phonemes is so sometimes subtle that they're [ðeː] can be misheard as they [ðe̞e ~ ðee̝] (see zero copula). In other varieties the difference is more noticeable, e.g. [ðeː] vs. [ðʌɪ] in Broad SAE and [ðɛə] vs. [ðeɪ] in the Cultivated variety. Even in General SAE, SQUARE can be [ɛə] or [ɛː], strongly distinguished from FACE [eɪ]. NEAR remains distinct in all varieties, typically as [ɪə]. Kevin Watson reports basically the same, subtle distinction between [eɪ] in FACE and [eː] in SQUARE in Scouse. The latter is used not only for SQUARE but also in the NURSE set, so that fur is homophonous with fair as [feː] - see square-nurse merger. The vowel is not necessarily as front/close as this and pronunciations such as [fɛː] and [fəː] also occur, with [fəː] being the more traditional variant.

In the Cardiff dialect SQUARE can also be similar to cardinal [e] (though long [eː], as in South Africa), but FACE typically has a fully close ending point [ei] and thus the vowels are more distinct than in the General South African accent. An alternative realization of the former is an open-mid monophthong [ɛː]. Formerly, FACE was sometimes realized as a narrow diphthong [eɪ], but this has virtually disappeared by the 1990s. NEAR is phonemically distinct, normally as [iː] before any /r/ (a fleece–near merger) and a disyllabic [iːə] elsewhere.

In Geordie, the merger of FACE and NEAR is recessive and has never been categorical (SQUARE [ɛː] has always been a distinct vowel), as FACE can instead be pronounced as the closing diphthong [eɪ] or, more commonly, the close-mid front monophthong [eː]. The latter is the most common choice for younger speakers, who tend to reject the centering diphthongs for FACE, which categorically undoes the merger for those speakers. Even when FACE is realized as an opening-centering diphthong, it may be distinguished from NEAR by the openness of the first element: [ɪə] or [eə] for FACE vs. [iə] for NEAR.

Some of the words listed below may have different forms in traditional Geordie. For the sake of simplicity, the merged vowel is transcribed with ⟨eː⟩. For a related merger not involving FACE, see near-square merger.

Homophonous pairs
/eɪ/ (from ME /aː/)	/eɪ/ (from ME /ai, ɛi(h)/)	/eə/	/ɪə/	IPA	Notes
	hay	hair, hare	here, hear	ˈeː	
	aid	aired		ˈeːd	
bade		bared	beard	ˈbeːd	
	bay	bare, bear	beer	ˈbeː	In fully non-rhotic varieties.
	day	dare	dear	ˈdeː	In fully non-rhotic varieties.
daze	days	dares	dears	ˈdeːz	
face			fierce	ˈfeːs	
fade		fared	feared	ˈfeːd	
	fay	fare, fair	fear	ˈfeː	In fully non-rhotic varieties.
	gay		gear	ˈɡeː	In fully non-rhotic varieties.
gaze	gays		gears	ˈɡeːz	
	hay, hey	hair, hair	here	ˈheː	In fully non-rhotic varieties.
haze	hays	hairs	hears	ˈheːz	
jade			jeered	ˈdʒeːd	
K	Kay	care		ˈkeː	In fully non-rhotic varieties.
K	Kay	care		ˈkeː	In fully non-rhotic varieties.
K	Kay	care		ˈkeː	In fully non-rhotic varieties.
	may	mare	mere	ˈmeː	In fully non-rhotic varieties.
maze	maize	mares		ˈmeːz	
	nay		near	ˈneː	In fully non-rhotic varieties.
phase		fares, fairs	fears	ˈfeːz	
	pay	pair, pear	peer	ˈpeː	In fully non-rhotic varieties.
	raid		reared	ˈreːd	
	ray	rare	rear	ˈreː	In fully non-rhotic varieties.
raze	raise, rays		rears	ˈreːz	
shade		shared	sheared	ˈʃeːd	
spade		spared	speared	ˈspeːd	
	staid, stayed	stared	steered	ˈsteːd	
	stay	stare	steer	ˈsteː	In fully non-rhotic varieties.
	they	their, there		ˈðeː	In fully non-rhotic varieties.
	way, weigh	wear		ˈweː	In fully non-rhotic varieties.

=== /ɑː/–/ɑːr/ merger ===
In Wells' terminology, the /ɑː/–/ɑːr/ merger consists of the merger of the lexical sets PALM and START. It is found in the speech of the great majority of non-rhotic speakers, including those of England, Wales, the United States, the Caribbean, Australia, New Zealand and South Africa. It may be absent in some non-rhotic speakers in the Bahamas.

Homophonous pairs resulting from this merger are rare in accents without the father-bother merger (see below). Two such pairs are father-farther and spa-spar

Homophonous pairs
/ɑː/	/ɑːr/	IPA	Notes
alms	arms	ˈɑːmz	
balmy	barmy	ˈbɑːmi	
calmer	karma	ˈkɑːmə	Calmer can also be pronounced with /l/: /ˈkɑːlmə/.
father	farther	ˈfɑːðə	
Ghana	garner	ˈɡɑːnə	
lava	larva	ˈlɑːvə	
ma	mar	ˈmɑː	
pa	par	ˈpɑː	
spa	spar	ˈspɑː	

==== /ɒ/–/ɑːr/ merger ====
In Wells' terminology, the /ɒ/–/ɑːr/ merger is a merger of LOT and START. This merger occurs in accents with the /ɑː/–/ɑːr/ merger described above that have also undergone the father-bother merger. This includes most non-rhotic American English (in Rhode Island, New York City, some Southern U.S., and some African-American accents, but not the Boston accent). This results in a greatly expanded number of homophonous pairs, such as god-guard.

Homophonous pairs
/ɒ/	/ɑːr/	IPA	Notes
Bob	barb	ˈbɑːb	
bot	Bart	ˈbɑːt	
box	barks	ˈbɑːks	
comma	karma	ˈkɑːmə	
clock	Clark; Clarke	ˈklɑːk	
cod	card	ˈkɑːd	
cop	carp	ˈkɑːp	
cot	cart	ˈkɑːt	
don	darn	ˈdɑːn	
dot	dart	ˈdɑːt	
gobble	garble	ˈɡɑːbəl	
god	guard	ˈɡɑːd	
hock	hark	ˈhɑːk	
hop	harp	ˈhɑːp	
hot	heart	ˈhɑːt	
lock	lark	ˈlɑːk	
lodge	large	ˈlɑːdʒ	
mock	mark	ˈmɑːk	
ox	arcs	ˈɑːks	
Polly	parley	ˈpɑːli	
potty	party	ˈpɑːti	
pox	parks	ˈpɑːks	
shod	shard	ˈʃɑːd	
shock	shark	ˈʃɑːk	
shop	sharp	ˈʃɑːp	
stock	stark	ˈstɑːk	
top	tarp	ˈtɑːp	

==== /ʌ/–/ɑːr/ merger ====
In Wells' terminology, this consists of the merger of the lexical sets STRUT and START. It occurs in Black South African English as a result of its STRUT-PALM merger, co-occurring with the /ɑ/–/ɑːr/ merger described above. The outcome of the merger is an open central vowel [ä] or, less frequently, an open-mid back vowel [ʌ].

In Australia and New Zealand, the two vowels contrast only by length: [ä for strut, and äː] for both palm and start. This (as well as SQUARE-monophthongization in Australian English) introduces phonemic vowel length to those dialects. In Colchester English, the vowels undergo a qualitative near-merger (with the length contrast preserved) as [ɐ] and [äː], at least for middle-class speakers. A more local pronunciation of /ɑː/ is front [aː]. A qualitative near-merger is also possible in contemporary General British English, where the vowels come close as [ʌ̞̈] vs. [ɑ̟ː], with only a slight difference in height in addition to the difference in length.

A three-way merger of /ʌ/, /ɑː/ and /æ/ is a common pronunciation error among L2 speakers of English whose native language is Italian, Spanish or Catalan. Notably, EFL speakers who aim at the British pronunciation of can't /kɑːnt/ but fail to lengthen the vowel sufficiently are perceived as uttering a highly-taboo word, cunt /kʌnt/.

Homophonous pairs
STRUT	PALM–START	IPA	Notes
buck	bark	ˈbak	
bud	bard	ˈbad	
bud	barred	ˈbad	
budge	barge	ˈbadʒ	
bun	barn	ˈban	
butt	Bart	ˈbat	
cup	carp	ˈkap	
cut	cart	ˈkat	
duck	dark	ˈdak	
duckling	darkling	ˈdaklɪŋ	
done	darn	ˈdan	
fuss	farce	ˈfas	
hut	heart	ˈhat	
mud	marred	ˈmad	
putt	part	ˈpat	

=== /ɔː/–/ɔr/ merger ===
In Wells' terminology, the caught–court merger consists of the merger of the lexical sets THOUGHT and NORTH. It is found in most of the same accents as the father–farther merger described above, including most British English, but is absent from the Bahamas and Guyana.

Labov et al. suggest that, in New York City English, this merger is present in perception not production. As in, although even locals perceive themselves using the same vowel in both cases, they tend to produce the NORTH/FORCE vowel higher and more retracted than the vowel of THOUGHT.

Most speakers with the pawn-porn merger also have the same vowels in caught and court (a merger of THOUGHT and FORCE), yielding a three-way merger of awe-or-ore/oar (see horse-hoarse merger). These include the accents of Southern England (but see THOUGHT split), non-rhotic New York City speakers, Trinidad and the Southern hemisphere.

The lot–cloth split, coupled with those mergers, produces a few more homophones, such as boss–bourse. Specifically, the phonemic merger of the words often and orphan was the basis for a joke in the Gilbert and Sullivan musical, The Pirates of Penzance.

Homophonous pairs
/ɔː/	/ɔr/	/oʊr/	IPA	Notes
awe	or	oar, ore	ˈɔː	
caught		court	ˈkɔːt	
caulk	cork		ˈkɔːk	
caw	corps	core	ˈkɔː	
draw	drawer		ˈdrɔː	
flaw		floor	ˈflɔː	
fought		fort	ˈfɔːt	
gnaw	nor		ˈnɔː	
laud	lord		ˈlɔːd	
law		lore	ˈlɔː	
paw		pore, pour	ˈpɔː	
raw		roar	ˈrɔː	
sauce		source	ˈsɔːs	
saw		soar, sore	ˈsɔː	
sawed		soared, sword	ˈsɔːd	
Sean		shorn	ˈʃɔːn	
sought	sort		ˈsɔːt	
stalk	stork		ˈstɔːk	
talk	torque		ˈtɔːk	
taught, taut	tort		ˈtɔːt	

==== /ɔː/–/ʊər/ merger ====
In Wells' terminology, the paw–poor or law–lure merger consists of the merger of the lexical sets THOUGHT and CURE. It is found in those non-rhotic accents containing the caught–court merger that have also undergone the pour–poor merger. Wells lists it unequivocally only for the accent of Trinidad, but it is an option for non-rhotic speakers in England, Australia and New Zealand. Such speakers have a potential four-way merger taw–tor–tore–tour.

Homophonous pairs
/ɔː/	/ʊər/	IPA	Notes
law	lure	ˈlɔː	With yod-dropping.
maw	moor	ˈmɔː	
paw	poor	ˈpɔː	

=== /oʊ/–/oʊr/ merger ===
In Wells' terminology, the dough-door merger consists of the merger of the lexical sets GOAT and FORCE. It may be found in some southern U.S. non-rhotic speech, some speakers of African American Vernacular English, some speakers in Guyana and some Welsh speech.

Homophonous pairs
/ɔʊ/	/oʊr//	IPA	Notes
beau	boar	ˈboʊ	
beau	bore	ˈboʊ	
bode	board	ˈboʊd	
bode	bored	ˈboʊd	
bone	borne	ˈboʊn	
bone	Bourne	ˈboʊn	
bow	boar	ˈboʊ	
bow	bore	ˈboʊ	
bowed	board	ˈboʊd	
bowed	bored	ˈboʊd	
chose	chores	ˈtʃoʊz	
coast	coursed	ˈkoʊst	
coat	court	ˈkoʊt	
code	cored	ˈkoʊd	
doe	door	ˈdoʊ	
does	doors	ˈdoʊz	
dough	door	ˈdoʊ	
doze	doors	ˈdoʊz	
floe	floor	ˈfloʊ	
flow	floor	ˈfloʊ	
foe	fore	ˈfoʊ	
foe	four	ˈfoʊ	
go	gore	ˈɡoʊ	
goad	gored	ˈɡoʊd	
hoe	whore	ˈhoʊ	
hoed	hoard	ˈhoʊd	
hoed	horde	ˈhoʊd	
hoed	whored	ˈhoʊd	
hose	whores	ˈhoʊz	
lo	lore	ˈloʊ	
low	lore	ˈloʊ	
moan	mourn	ˈmoʊn	
Moe	Moore	ˈmoʊ	
Moe	more	ˈmoʊ	
Mona	mourner	ˈmoʊnə	
mow	Moore	ˈmoʊ	
mow	more	ˈmoʊ	
mown	mourn	ˈmoʊn	
O	oar	ˈoʊ	
O	ore	ˈoʊ	
ode	oared	ˈoʊd	
oh	oar	ˈoʊ	
oh	ore	ˈoʊ	
owe	oar	ˈoʊ	
owe	ore	ˈoʊ	
owed	oared	ˈoʊd	
Po	pore	ˈpoʊ	
Po	pour	ˈpoʊ	
Poe	pore	ˈpoʊ	
Poe	pour	ˈpoʊ	
poach	porch	ˈpoʊtʃ	
poke	pork	ˈpoʊk	
pose	pores	ˈpoʊz	
pose	pours	ˈpoʊz	
road	roared	ˈroʊd	
rode	roared	ˈroʊd	
roe	roar	ˈroʊ	
rose	roars	ˈroʊz	
row	roar	ˈroʊ	
rowed	roared	ˈroʊd	
sew	soar	ˈsoʊ	
sew	sore	ˈsoʊ	
sewed	soared	ˈsoʊd	
sewed	sored	ˈsoʊd	
sewed	sword	ˈsoʊd	
shone	shorn	ˈʃoʊn	
show	shore	ˈʃoʊ	
shown	shorn	ˈʃoʊn	
snow	snore	ˈsnoʊ	
so	soar	ˈsoʊ	
so	sore	ˈsoʊ	
sow	soar	ˈsoʊ	
sow	sore	ˈsoʊ	
sowed	soared	ˈsoʊd	
sowed	sored	ˈsoʊd	
sowed	sword	ˈsoʊd	
stow	store	ˈstoʊ	
toad	toward	ˈtoʊd	
toe	tore	ˈtoʊ	
toed	toward	ˈtoʊd	
tone	torn	ˈtoʊn	
tow	tore	ˈtoʊ	
towed	toward	ˈtoʊd	
woe	wore	ˈwoʊ	
whoa	wore	ˈwoʊ	With wine–whine merger.
yo	yore	ˈjoʊ	
yo	your	ˈjoʊ	

==== /oʊ/–/ʊər/ merger ====
In Wells' terminology, the show–sure or toad–toured merger consists of the merger of the lexical sets GOAT and CURE. It may be present in those speakers who have both the dough–door merger described above, and also the pour–poor merger. These include some southern U.S. non-rhotic speakers, some speakers of African-American English (in both cases towards /oʊ/) and some speakers in Guyana.

In Geordie, the merger (towards /ʊə/, phonetically [uə]) is variable and recessive. It is also not categorical, as GOAT can instead be pronounced as the close-mid monophthongs [oː] and [ɵː]. The central [ɵː] is as stereotypically Geordie as the merger itself, though it is still used alongside [oː] by young, middle-class males who, as younger speakers in general, reject the centering diphthongs for /oː/ (females often merge /oː/ with /ɔː/ instead, see thought-goat merger). This categorically undoes the merger for those speakers. Even when GOAT is realized as an opening-centering diphthong, it may be distinguished from CURE by the openness of the first element: [ʊə] or [oə] vs. [uə].

Some of the words listed below may have different forms in traditional Geordie.

Homophonous pairs
/oʊ/	/ʊər/	IPA	Notes
bow	boor	ˈboʊ	
low	lure	ˈloʊ	With yod-dropping.
mode	moored	ˈmoʊd	
mow	moor	ˈmoʊ	
show	sure	ˈʃoʊ	
toad	toured	ˈtoʊd	
toe, tow	tour	ˈtoʊ	

=== Tautosyllabic pre-consonantal /ɔɪ/–/ɜːr/ merger ===
A conditioned merger of CHOICE and NURSE is famously associated with early 20th-century New York City English; see coil–curl merger below.

== Up-gliding NURSE ==
Southern up-gliding NURSE
Examples of up-gliding NURSE in the speech of Older Southern American English speaker Strom Thurmond ("thirtieth", "thirty-first", "first", "heard", "urge")

Up-gliding NURSE is a diphthongized vowel sound, [əɪ], used as the pronunciation of the NURSE phoneme /ɜːr/. This up-gliding variant historically occurred in some completely non-rhotic dialects of American English and is particularly associated with the early twentieth-century (but now extinct or moribund) dialects of New York City, New Orleans, and Charleston, likely developing in the prior century. In fact, in speakers born before World War I, this sound apparently predominated throughout the older speech of the Southern United States that ranged from "South Carolina to Texas and north to eastern Arkansas and the southern edge of Kentucky." This variant happened only when /ɜːr/ was followed by a consonant in the same morpheme; thus, for example, stir was never [stəɪ]; rather, stir would have been pronounced [stə(ɹ)].

In 1966, according to a survey that was done by William Labov in New York City, 100% of the people 60 and over used [əɪ] for bird. With each younger age group, however, the percentage got progressively lower: 59% of 50- to 59-year-olds, 33% of 40- to 49-year-olds, 24% of 20- to 39-year-olds, and finally, only 4% of 8- to 19-year-olds used [əɪ] for bird. Nearly all native New Yorkers born since 1950, even those whose speech is otherwise non-rhotic, now pronounce bird as [bɚd]. However, Labov reports this vowel to be slightly raised compared to other dialects. In addition, a study from 2014 found [əɪ] variably in two participating native New Yorkers, one of whom was born as late as the early 1990s.

=== Coil–curl merger ===
In some cases, particularly in New York City, the NURSE sound gliding from a schwa upwards even led to a phonemic merger of the vowel classes associated with the General American phonemes /ɔɪ/ as in CHOICE and /ɜːr/ as in NURSE; thus, words like coil and curl, as well as voice and verse, were homophones. The merged vowel was typically a diphthong [əɪ], with a mid central starting point, rather than the back rounded starting point of /ɔɪ/ of CHOICE in most other accents of English. The merger is responsible for the "Brooklynese" stereotypes of bird sounding like boid and thirty-third sounding like toity-toid. This merger is also known for the word soitenly, used often by the Three Stooges comedian Curly Howard as a variant of certainly in comedy shorts of the 1930s and 1940s. The songwriter Sam M. Lewis, a native New Yorker, rhymed returning with joining in the lyrics of the English-language version of "Gloomy Sunday". Except for New Orleans English, this merger did not occur in the South, despite up-gliding NURSE existing in some older Southern accents; instead, a distinction between the two phonemes was maintained due to a down-gliding CHOICE sound: something like [ɔɛ].

Homophonous pairs
/ɔɪ/	/ɜːr/	IPA	Notes
adjoin	adjourn	əˈdʒəɪn	
boil	burl	ˈbəɪl	
Boyd	bird	ˈbəɪd	
Boyle	burl	ˈbəɪl	
coil	curl	ˈkəɪl	
coin	kern	ˈkəɪn	
coitus	Curtis	ˈkəɪɾəs	With weak vowel merger, normally with intervocalic alveolar flapping.
foil	furl	ˈfəɪl	
goitre; goiter	girder	ˈɡəɪɾə	With the t–d merger.
hoist	Hearst	ˈhəɪst	
hoist	hurst; Hurst	ˈhəɪst	
Hoyle	hurl	ˈhəɪl	
loin	learn	ˈləɪn	
oil	earl	ˈəɪl	
poil	pearl	ˈpəɪl	
poise	purrs	ˈpəɪz	
toyed	turd	ˈtəɪd	
voice	verse	ˈvəɪs	
Voight	vert	ˈvəɪt	

== Effect of non-rhotic dialects on orthography ==
Certain words have spellings derived from non-rhotic dialects or renderings of foreign words through non-rhotic pronunciation. In rhotic dialects, spelling pronunciation has caused these words to be pronounced rhotically anyway. Examples include:

- Er and Erm, used in non-rhotic dialects to indicate a filled pause, which most rhotic dialects would instead convey with uh, eh, and um.
- The game Parcheesi, from Indian Pachisi.
- British English slang words:
  - char for cha from the Cantonese pronunciation of Chinese: 茶 (= "tea" (the drink))
- In Rudyard Kipling's books:
  - dorg instead of dawg for a drawled pronunciation of dog.
  - Hindu god name Kama misspelled as Karma (which is a concept in several Asian religions, not a god).
  - Hindustani काग़ज़ / کاغذ kāghaz ("paper") spelled as kargaz.
- The donkey Eeyore in A. A. Milne's stories, whose name comes from the sound that donkeys make, commonly spelled hee-haw in American English. This one also factors in h-dropping.
- Southern American terms goober and pinder from KiKongo and ngubá and mpinda; both meaning peanut.
- Burma, Bamar and Myanmar for Burmese [bəmà] (first two) and [mjàmmà]
- Orlu in some names for Igbo [ɔ̀lʊ́]. See also the spelling of William Onyeabor's name.
- Transliteration of Cantonese words and names, such as char siu (Chinese: 叉燒; Jyutping: caa¹ siu¹) and Wong Kar-wai (Chinese: 王家衞; Jyutping: Wong⁴ Gaa¹wai⁶)
- The spelling of schoolmarm for school ma'am; the latter term is now uncommon.
- The spelling Park for the Korean surname 박 (pronounced [pak]), which does not contain a liquid consonant in Korean.
- The English spelling dumsor for the Akan term dumsɔ.
- The word gormless "foolish, stupid", which comes from the archaic abstract word gaum "attention, perception".

== See also ==
- English-language vowel changes before historical /r/
- Commonwealth English
- Resh
- Phonological history of Spanish coronal fricatives
- Yeísmo

== Bibliography ==
- Bauer, Laurie; Warren, Paul (2004), "New Zealand English: phonology", in Schneider, Edgar W.; Burridge, Kate; Kortmann, Bernd; Mesthrie, Rajend; Upton, Clive (eds.), A handbook of varieties of English, vol. 1: Phonology, Mouton de Gruyter, pp. 580–602, ISBN 3-11-017532-0
- Bauer, Laurie; Warren, Paul; Bardsley, Dianne; Kennedy, Marianna; Major, George (2007), "New Zealand English", Journal of the International Phonetic Association, 37 (1): 97–102, doi:10.1017/S0025100306002830
- Beal, Joan (2004), "English dialects in the North of England: phonology", in Schneider, Edgar W.; Burridge, Kate; Kortmann, Bernd; Mesthrie, Rajend; Upton, Clive (eds.), A handbook of varieties of English, vol. 1: Phonology, Mouton de Gruyter, pp. 113–133, ISBN 3-11-017532-0
- Bowerman, Sean (2004), "White South African English: phonology", in Schneider, Edgar W.; Burridge, Kate; Kortmann, Bernd; Mesthrie, Rajend; Upton, Clive (eds.), A handbook of varieties of English, vol. 1: Phonology, Mouton de Gruyter, pp. 931–942, ISBN 3-11-017532-0
- Collins, Beverley; Mees, Inger M. (1990), "The Phonetics of Cardiff English", in Coupland, Nikolas; Thomas, Alan Richard (eds.), English in Wales: Diversity, Conflict, and Change, Multilingual Matters Ltd., pp. 87–103, ISBN 1-85359-032-0
- Cox, Felicity; Fletcher, Janet (2017) [First published 2012], Australian English Pronunciation and Transcription (2nd ed.), Cambridge University Press, ISBN 978-1-316-63926-9
- Cruttenden, Alan (2014), Gimson's Pronunciation of English (8th ed.), Routledge, ISBN 978-1-4441-8309-2
- Devonish, Hubert; Harry, Otelemate G. (2004), "Jamaican Creole and Jamaican English: phonology", in Schneider, Edgar W.; Burridge, Kate; Kortmann, Bernd; Mesthrie, Rajend; Upton, Clive (eds.), A handbook of varieties of English, vol. 1: Phonology, Mouton de Gruyter, pp. 964–984, ISBN 3-11-017532-0
- Fisher, John Hurt (2001). "British and American, Continuity and Divergence". In Algeo, John (ed.). The Cambridge History of the English Language, Volume VI: English in North America. Cambridge: Cambridge University Press. pp. 59–85. ISBN 0-521-26479-0.
- Gick, Bryan (1999). "A gesture-based account of intrusive consonants in English" (PDF). Phonology. 16 (1): 29–54. doi:10.1017/s0952675799003693. S2CID 61173209. Archived from the original (PDF) on 12 April 2013.
- Kurath, H. (1964). A Phonology and Prosody of Modern English. Heidelberg: Carl Winter.
- Labov, William; Ash, Sharon; Boberg, Charles (2006). The Atlas of North American English. Berlin: Mouton de Gruyter. ISBN 3-11-016746-8.
- Lass, Roger (1990), "A 'standard' South African vowel system", in Ramsaran, Susan (ed.), Studies in the Pronunciation of English: A Commemorative Volume in Honour of A.C. Gimson, Routledge, pp. 272–285, ISBN 978-0-41507180-2
- Lass, Roger (1999). "Phonology and Morphology". In Lass, Roger (ed.). The Cambridge History of the English Language, Volume III: 1476–1776. Cambridge: Cambridge University Press. pp. 56–186. ISBN 0-521-26476-6.
- Lass, Roger (2002), "South African English", in Mesthrie, Rajend (ed.), Language in South Africa, Cambridge University Press, ISBN 978-0-521-79105-2
- Pollock, Bailey, Berni, Fletcher, Hinton, Johnson, Roberts, & Weaver (17 March 2001). "Phonological Features of African American Vernacular English (AAVE)". Archived from the original on 25 October 2016.
- Swan, Michael (2001), Learner English: A Teacher's Guide to Interference and Other Problems, Volume 1, Cambridge University Press, ISBN 978-0-521-77939-5
- Thomas, Erik R. (2008). "Rural White Southern Accents". In Edgar W. Schneider (ed.). Varieties of English: The Americas and the Caribbean. Berlin: Mouton de Gruyter. pp. 87–114. ISBN 978-3-11-019636-8.
- Trudgill, Peter (1984). Language in the British Isles. Cambridge: Cambridge University Press.
- Trudgill, Peter (2004), "The dialect of East Anglia: Phonology", in Schneider, Edgar W.; Burridge, Kate; Kortmann, Bernd; Mesthrie, Rajend; Upton, Clive (eds.), A handbook of varieties of English, vol. 1: Phonology, Mouton de Gruyter, pp. 163–177, ISBN 3-11-017532-0
- van Rooy, Bertus (2004), "Black South African English: phonology", in Schneider, Edgar W.; Burridge, Kate; Kortmann, Bernd; Mesthrie, Rajend; Upton, Clive (eds.), A handbook of varieties of English, vol. 1: Phonology, Mouton de Gruyter, pp. 943–952, ISBN 3-11-017532-0
- Watson, Kevin (2007), "Liverpool English" (PDF), Journal of the International Phonetic Association, 37 (3): 351–360, doi:10.1017/s0025100307003180, S2CID 232345844
- Watt, Dominic (2000), "Phonetic parallels between the close–mid vowels of Tyneside English: Are they internally or externally motivated?", Language Variation and Change, 12 (1): 69–101, doi:10.1017/S0954394500121040, S2CID 144002794
- Watt, Dominic; Allen, William (2003), "Tyneside English", Journal of the International Phonetic Association, 33 (2): 267–271, doi:10.1017/S0025100303001397
- Wells, John C. (1982). Accents of English. Vol. 1: An Introduction (pp. i–xx, 1–278), Vol. 2: The British Isles (pp. i–xx, 279–466), Vol. 3: Beyond the British Isles (pp. i–xx, 467–674). Cambridge University Press. doi:10.1017/CBO9780511611759, doi:10.1017/CBO9780511611766. ISBN 0-52129719-2, 0-52128540-2, 0-52128541-0.
