= Paul S. Cohen =

American linguist

Paul Sheldon Cohen (born February 24, 1941) is an American linguist (M.A. Columbia University, 1970), who has been professionally active in language-related areas since 1963, when he took a position as an editor on the Random House Dictionary of the English Language. From 1965 to 1967 he worked with William Labov and coauthored several reports on African American Vernacular English.

He has spent the majority of his career (most of the period from 1968 to 2002) working for IBM in such areas as automatic speech recognition, text-to-speech, and natural language processing as a research staff member, and also in development (senior computational linguist) and strategy (program manager, speech technology). During that period, in addition to a stint as senior product developer / linguist (2000 to 2001) at Net2Phone, Inc., he also held various editorial and consulting positions (inside and outside IBM), and was a member of the committee that formulated the original Electric Company television series.

Cohen holds seven patents in various areas of speech processing. Since 2002, he has been a consultant and independent researcher, and has published several articles in the fields of Indo-European studies and English etymology and philology.

== Selected publications ==
- 1968, (with William Labov, Clarence Robins, and John Lewis). A study of the Non-Standard English of Negro and Puerto Rican Speakers in New York City, V. 1: Phonological and Grammatical Analysis. Washington, DC: Office of Education, Bureau of Research/ERIC.
- 1968, (with William Labov, Clarence Robins, and John Lewis). A study of the Non-Standard English of Negro and Puerto Rican Speakers in New York City', V. 2: The Use of Language in the Speech Community. Washington, DC: Office of Education, Bureau of Research/ERIC.
