= Skell =

Slang for vagrant

Skell refers to a person who is homeless, vagrant or derelict. It is often used to connote such a person who is habitually engaged in small-time criminal activity, especially by one working as a con artist or panhandler.

== History ==
In its modern form, the use of skell as a slang term in the United States appears to date from the 1960s, most especially from New York City. The word has sometimes been used by the police officer characters on the TV shows NYPD Blue, Third Watch, Gotham, Law and Order: SVU, and Blue Bloods, as well as Better Call Saul. The term has been used so often on these programs that it has essentially come to mean any sort of criminal or perp, which itself has come to mean anyone accused of a crime. It also appears in the 1964 novel Last Exit to Brooklyn by American author Hubert Selby, Jr.
