= New York Latino English =

Sociolect

- East Coast Latino English
- Native to: United States
- Region: New York metropolitan area
- Ethnicity: Hispanic and Latino Americans
- Language family: Indo-European: Germanic; West Germanic; North Sea Germanic; Anglo–Frisian; Anglic; English; North American English; American English; New York Latino English
- Writing system: Latin (English alphabet); American Braille

Language codes
- ISO 639-3: –

American English as primarily spoken by Hispanic and Latino Americans on the East Coast of the United States demonstrates considerable influence from New York City English and African-American Vernacular English, with certain additional features borrowed from the Spanish language. Though not currently confirmed to be a single stabilized dialect, this variety has received some attention in the academic literature, being recently labelled New York Latino English, referring to its city of twentieth-century origin, or, more inclusively, East Coast Latino English. In the 1970s scholarship, the variety was more narrowly called (New York) Puerto Rican English or Nuyorican English.

== History and overview ==
The variety originated with Puerto Ricans and some Dominicans moving to New York City after World War I, though particularly in the subsequent generations born in the New York dialect region who were native speakers of both English and often Spanish. Today, it covers the English of many Latino Americans of diverse heritages (not simply Puerto Ricans) in the New York metropolitan area and beyond along the northeastern coast of the United States.

According to linguist William Labov, "A thorough and accurate study of geographic differences in the English of Latinos from the Caribbean and various countries of Central and South America is beyond the scope of the current work", largely because "consistent dialect patterns are still in the process of formation". Importantly, this East Coast Latino ethnolect is a native variety of American English and not a form of Spanglish, broken English, or interlanguage, and other ethnic American English dialects are similarly documented. It is not spoken by all Latinos in this region, and it is not spoken only by Latinos. It is sometimes spoken by people who know little or no Spanish.

== Phonology ==
=== General phonology ===
- Some New York Latino English speakers, the best documented being East Harlem Puerto Rican males with many African-American contacts, may be indistinguishable by sound from African-American Vernacular English (AAVE) speakers.
- New York Latino English utterances may have some degree of syllable-timed rhythms, so syllables take up roughly the same amount of time with roughly the same amount of stress and particularly among older and male speakers. Standard American English is stress-timed, so only stressed syllables are evenly timed, though Spanish is also syllable-timed.
- /t/ and /d/ are realized as dental stops [t̪] and [d̪] rather than as the standard American and AAVE alveolars [t] and [d] (a feature also found in many Romance languages, including Spanish). Dentalization is generally also common in New York accents, and /n/ in New York Latino English is also pronounced dentally, as [n̪].
- /θ/ is often pronounced [t̪], with the possibility of a near-merger among words like thin [t̪ɪn̪] and tin [t̪ʰɪn̪].
- Devoicing of voiced obstruent codas is optional among stronger accents (e.g., characterize may be realized with a final [s]).
- Consonant cluster simplifications occur such as the loss of dental stops after nasals (bent) and fricatives, (left, test). That also leads to a characteristic plural, in which words like tests are pronounced [ˈt̪ɛst̪ɨs], though this is highly stigmatized and not necessarily common.
- /l/ in syllable onsets (meaning at the beginning of syllables, such as in light, last, lose, line, uplink, etc.) and intervocalically (between vowels like filling or tally) are typically "clear" or "light". This differentiates Latinos from all other ethnic groups in New York. In syllable codas (at the end of syllables), however, /l/ is often vocalized (turned into a back vowel) so that, for instance, soul may approach the sound of so, and tool may approach the sound of too.
- Predominantly, pronunciation is variably rhotic (in other words, pronouncing the R sound only between and before vowels, but not consistently after vowels), in the same vein as current-day New York City English, African-American Vernacular English, and Caribbean Spanish (wherein word-final /r/ is silent). Cultivated forms may be fully rhotic, particularly among many professional-class Hispanic New Yorkers from higher socioeconomic backgrounds. The R sound, when pronounced, is the typical English postalveolar approximant [ɹ̠].

=== Subcultural variations ===
As the unity of the dialect is still in transition, in order to enhance their study, Slomanson & Newman grouped their participants based on differences in subcultural (or peer group) participation and identification. The study differentiated between the influential youth groups/subcultures of hip hop (involving rap music, turntablism, graffiti art, etc.), skater/BMX (involving bicycling and skateboarding tricks), and geek (involving video game culture, computers, and other technological interests). The findings located young Latinos mostly in the first two categories (with hip hop culture being influenced significantly by African-American Vernacular English and NYC skater/BMX culture by NYC European-American Vernacular English and General American English). Latinos also largely fell into a third, non-peer-based grouping: family-oriented, whose members show the strongest pride and self-identification with their ethno-cultural heritage. They admittedly did not examine gang (or "thug") culture, which minimally affected their population sample.

The study found that the gliding vowel /aɪ/ becomes a glideless [aː], so, for example, the word ride approaches the sound of rod, in Latino members of hip hop culture; a middling degree of that was found with the family-oriented group and the least degree of it with the skater/BMX group. Just over 50% of all speakers showed /uː/ to be backed before coronal consonants (in dude, lose, soon, etc.), with little variation based on peer groups. For the gliding vowel /eɪ/, just over 50% of speakers show no gliding, except in the skater/BMX group, where this drops to just over 30% of speakers. For the gliding vowel /oʊ/, just over 70% of speakers show no gliding, except in the skater/BMX group, where this drops to less than 50% of speakers. Such instances of glide deletion are indicators of the dialect's contact with Spanish.

== Grammar and vocabulary ==
- Similarity of many grammatical structures between New York Latino English and African-American Vernacular English (AAVE) is clearly evident.
  - Lack of inversion or do support particularly in first- and second-person questions (I can go to the bathroom? rather than Can I go to the bathroom?)
- Calques and direct translations of Spanish expressions and words (owned by the devil, instead of possessed by the devil, closed meaning locked).
- The AAVE and Southern U.S. term you-all [juɑw] or y'all is common.

== Notable native speakers ==
- Cardi B (variably rhotic; /aɪ/ glide deletion) – "an Afro-Latina with a thick Bronx accent"
- Fat Joe (non-rhotic; /aɪ/ glide deletion) – "Fat Joe is a born and bred Bronxite who still speaks in the singular city accent"
- Luis Guzmán (non-rhotic; no /aɪ/ glide deletion) – "his Nuyorican accent is oh so thick"
- La India (variably rhotic; variable /aɪ/ glide deletion) – "speaking in a gruff Nuyorican accent"
- John Leguizamo (variably rhotic; variable /aɪ/ glide deletion) – "his hardcore New York accent" and "he has a Nuyorican accent he can't shake"
- Jennifer Lopez (rhotic; no /aɪ/ glide deletion) – "Bronx Puerto Rican... when I grew up I talked like this" and "her Nuyorican (meaning, a Puerto Rican from New York, since Jenny from the Block was born in the Bronx) accent"
- Rosie Perez (non-rhotic; no /aɪ/ glide deletion) – "she will always be remembered [for...] the Nuyorican accent" and "a high-pitched voice with a thick Nuyorican accent"
- Marc Anthony (variably rhotic; no /aɪ/ glide deletion)
- Shaggy Flores (non-rhotic; no /aɪ/ glide deletion)
- Immortal Technique (variably rhotic; /aɪ/ glide deletion)
- Lumidee (variably rhotic; no /aɪ/ glide deletion)
- Rick Gonzalez (variably rhotic; no /aɪ/ glide deletion)
- Cuban Link (variably rhotic; no /aɪ/ glide deletion)
- Joell Ortiz (variably rhotic; /aɪ/ glide deletion)
- Victor Rasuk (variably rhotic; no /aɪ/ glide deletion)
- Prince Royce (rhotic; no /aɪ/ glide deletion)
- Glen Tapia (variably rhotic; /aɪ/ glide deletion)
- Tru Life (variably rhotic; no /aɪ/ glide deletion)
- Lauren Vélez (rhotic; no /aɪ/ glide deletion)
- David Zayas (non-rhotic; no /aɪ/ glide deletion)
- 6ix9ine (variably rhotic; no /aɪ/ glide deletion)
- Big Pun (non-rhotic; no /aɪ/ glide deletion)
- Romeo Santos (variably rhotic; /aɪ/ glide deletion)

== Bibliography ==
- Newman, Michael (2014), New York City English, Mouton de Gruyter.
- Slomanson, Peter; Newman, Michael (2004), Peer Group Identification and Variation in New York Latino English Laterals (PDF), English World-Wide, 25, pp. 199–216
- Wolfram, Walt & Natalie Schilling Estes (2005) American English 2nd edition Blackwell ISBN 1-4051-1265-4
- Wolfram, Walt & Ben Ward (2005) American Voices: How Dialects Differ from Coast to Coast Blackwell ISBN 1-4051-2109-2
